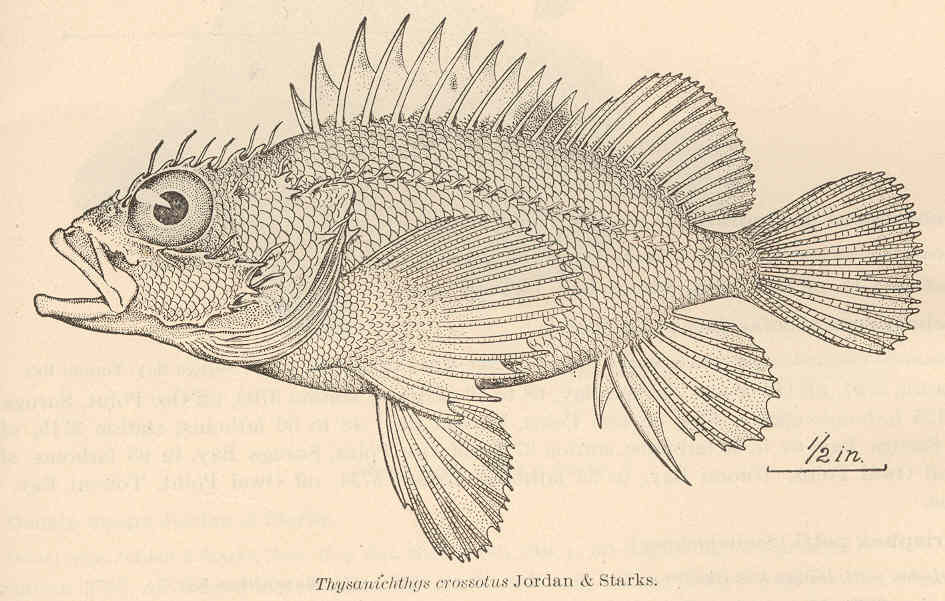

Scientific classification
- Kingdom: Animalia
- Phylum: Chordata
- Class: Actinopterygii
- Order: Perciformes
- Family: Scorpaenidae
- Subfamily: Scorpaeninae
- Genus: Thysanichthys; Jordan & Starks, 1904
- Species: T. crossotus

Binomial name
- Thysanichthys crossotus Jordan & Starks, 1904

Synonyms
- Scorpaenodes crossotus (Jordan & Starks, 1904)

= Thysanichthys =

Species of fish

Thysanichthys is a genus of marine ray-finned fishes belonging to the family Scorpaenidae, it is a monotypic genus with its only species being Thysanichthys crossotus. This species is found in the northwestern Pacific Ocean.

== Taxonomy ==
Thysanichthys was described as a genus in 1904 by the American ichthyologists David Starr Jordan and Edwin Chapin Starks when they described Thysanichthys crossotus, giving its type locality as off Ose Point in Suruga Bay in Japan. In 1914, Jordan and William Francis Thompson described a second species, Thysanichthys evides, but in 2010 this was shown to be a senior synonym of Scorpaenodes littoralis Tanaka, 1917 and was correctly classified within the genus Scorpaenodes, confirming Thysanichthys as a monotypic genus. The name of the genus Thysanichthys is a compound of thysanos which means fringe, a reference to the dermal cirri on the head and along the lateral line with ichthys, meaning fish. The specific name crossotus means "fringed".

== Description ==
Thysanichthys cossotus is distinguished from other related scorpionfishes by having 13 spines in its dorsal fin, teeth on the palatine, filaments growing from the skin on the head and lateral line, there is no enlarged spine or ridge on the operculum and by having stronger spines on the head and suborbital bone. This species attains a maximum published total length of 8.4 cm (3.3 in)>

== Distribution and habitat ==
Thysanichthys crossotus is found in the northwestern Pacific Ocean around Japan, Taiwan and the East China Sea. It is a demersal fish which is found at depths between 120 and 130 m (390 and 430 ft).
