= C. typicus =

C. typicus may refer to:

- Caracanthus typicus, the Hawaiian orbicular velvetfish, a species of fish in the family Scorpaenidae
- Corvus typicus, the piping crow, a species of bird in the family Corvidae
- Cryptolithodes typicus, the umbrella crab, a species of king crab
