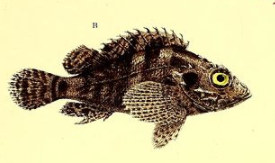

Conservation status
- Least Concern (IUCN 3.1)

Scientific classification
- Kingdom: Animalia
- Phylum: Chordata
- Class: Actinopterygii
- Order: Perciformes
- Family: Scorpaenidae
- Genus: Scorpaenodes
- Species: S. guamensis

Binomial name
- Scorpaenodes guamensis (Quoy & Gaimard, 1824)

Synonyms
- Scorpaena guamensis Quoy & Gaimard, 1824; Scorpaena rubropunctata Cuvier, 1829; Sebastes minutus Cuvier, 1829; Scorpaena chilioprista Rüppell, 1838; Scorpaena polylepis Bleeker, 1851; Centropogon echinatus Macleay, 1881; Scorpaena erinacea Garman, 1903; Scorpaenopsis quiescens Seale, 1906

= Scorpaenodes guamensis =

Species of fish

Scorpaenodes guamensis, the Guam scorpionfish or common scorpionfish, is a species of venomous, marine, ray-finned fish belonging to the family Scorpaenidae, the scorpionfishes. It has a wide Indo-Pacific distribution.

== Taxonomy ==
Scorpaenodes guamensis was first formally described in 1824 as Scorpaena guamensis by the French naturalists Jean René Constant Quoy and Joseph Paul Gaimard with the type locality given as Guam. In 1857 Pieter Bleeker described a new genus, Scorpaenodes, with Scorpaena polylepsis, a species he had described in 1851, as its type species by monotypy. S. polylepsis is considered to be a junior synonym of S. guamensis and so is the type species of its genus. The specific name means "of Guam".

== Description ==
Scorpaenodes guamensis has 13 or 14 spines and 7 to 9 spines in its dorsal fin while there are 3 spines and 5 soft rays in the anal fin. There are between 17 and 20 fin rays in the pectoral fin. typically 18, with some rays being branched in individuals with a standard length greater than 4 cm (1.6 in). There is a nasal spine, the lateral lacrimal spine is normally present, there are 2 suborbital spines with the first spine underneath the eye and the second spine at the rear of the suborbital ridge. There are no interorbital and coronal spines. The body, head and fins are a mottled reddish colour and there is a large dark blotch on the operculum but there is no dark blotch on suboperculum or on the spiny part of the dorsal fin. This species reaches a maximum total length of 14 cm (5.5 in).

== Distribution and habitat ==
Scorpaenodes guamensis has a wide Indo-Pacific distribution from the Red Sea and the coasts of eastern Africa eastwards through the Indian and Pacific Oceans as far east as Tonga and the Society Island, north to southern Japan and south to Australia. This is a shallow water species, being found down to 20 m (66 ft), although it is typically found in water with depths of less than 5 m (16 ft) where it lives on reef flats, in shallow lagoons and in channels, often giding in rock crevices.

== Biology ==
Scorpaenodes guamensis is a solitary, nocturnal, camouflaged, ambush predator which feeds on small crustaceans and polychaete worms.

== Utilisation ==
Scorpaenodes guamensis is rare in the aquarium trade.
