= Pontinus nigropunctatus =

Conservation status
- Least Concern (IUCN 3.1)

Scientific classification
- Kingdom: Animalia
- Phylum: Chordata
- Class: Actinopterygii
- Order: Perciformes
- Family: Scorpaenidae
- Genus: Pontinus
- Species: P. nigropunctatus

Binomial name
- Pontinus nigropunctatus (Günther, 1868)

Synonyms
- Sebastes nigropunctatus Günther, 1868

Species of fish

Pontinus nigropunctatus, the deepwater jack or St. Helena deepwater scorpionfish, is a species of marine ray-finned fish belonging to the family Scorpaenidae, the scorpionfishes. It is found in the southern Atlantic Ocean.

== Taxonomy ==
Pontinus nigropunctatus was first formally described as Sebastes nigropunctatus by the German-born British ichthyologist Albert Günther, with St Helena given as the type locality. The specific name nigropunctatus means "black spotted", an allusion to the many dusky spots on its reddish body.

== Description ==
Pontinus nigropunctatus has a reddish-rose coloured body, with the upper body being marked with numerous blackish-brown spots. The maximum recorded total length for this fish is 35 cm (14 in).

== Distribution and habitat ==
Pontinus nigropunctatus was thought to be a species which was endemic to St Helena, but it has also been found at the Bonaparte Seamount, the Grattan Seamount, Ascension Island, and the Saint Peter and Saint Paul Archipelago of Brazil. It is a deepwater species with a depth range of 146 to 183 m (479 to 600 ft) which occurs over hard substrates.

== Biology ==
Pontinus nigropunctatus has been found to have a sex ratio of 1.8 males for each female. The females carry an average of 49,544 oocytes, with the larger fishes having a greater number of oocytes. The deepwater jack may develop its oocytes asynchronously.

== Fisheries ==
Pontinus nigropunctatus is not a frequent quarry for fishermen despite its palatable, soft white flesh.

== Conservation status ==
Pontinus nigropunctatus was assessed by the IUCN as Vulnerable in 1996. The assessment was based on its restricted range, as it was understood to be endemic to St Helena. Later discovery of its wider distribution has led to its status changing to Least Concern.
