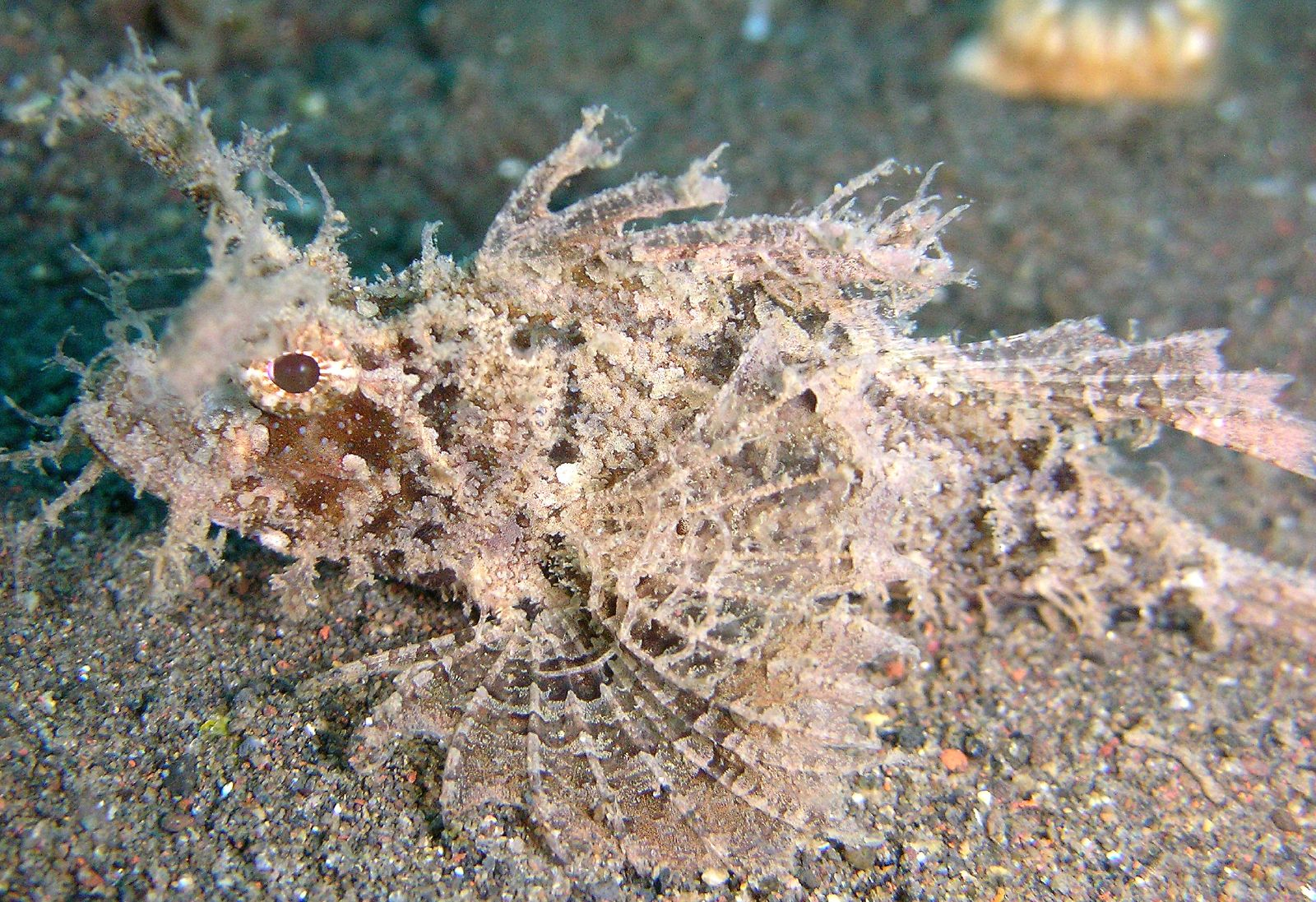

Conservation status
- Least Concern (IUCN 3.1)

Scientific classification
- Kingdom: Animalia
- Phylum: Chordata
- Class: Actinopterygii
- Order: Perciformes
- Family: Scorpaenidae
- Genus: Pteroidichthys
- Species: P. amboinensis

Binomial name
- Pteroidichthys amboinensis Bleeker, 1856

Synonyms
- Rhinopias godfreyi Whitley, 1954; Pteroidichthys godfreyi (Whitley, 1954)

= Pteroidichthys amboinensis =

Species of fish

Pteroidichthys amboinensis, the Ambon scorpionfish or Godfrey's scorpionfish, is a species of marine ray-finned fish belonging to the family Scorpaenidae, the scorpionfishes. It is found in the Indian and Pacific oceans.

== Taxonomy ==
Pteroidichthys amboinensis was first formally described in 1856 by the Dutch herpetologist, ichthyologist and physician Pieter Bleeker with the type localities give as Ambon Island in the Moluccas and Manodo on Sulawesi. When Bleeker described this species he classified it in a new genus, Pteroidichthys, as the only species in the new genus making it the type species of that genus by monotypy. In 1954 the Australian ichthyologist Gilbert Percy Whitley described a new species as Rhinopias godfreyi from Exmouth Gulf in Western Australia but this taxon is now considered to be a junior synonym of P. amboinensis, however, this species is still called Godfrey's scorpionfish in Australia. The specific name refers to the type locality of Ambon Island.

== Description ==
Pteroidichthys amboinensis has the elongate, compressed body typical of the genus Pteroidichthys. This species has 12 flexible spines and 9 soft rays in its dorsal fin and 2 spines and 6 soft rays in its anal fin. It has a relatively short snout which is on average around 14% of its standard length. The rear margin of the maxilla extends past a vertical line through the centre of the pupil. There are supraorbital tentacles and the posterior lacrimal spines are well developed, being longer than the diameter of the orbit. There are many tentacles on the body and the fins. The lateral lacrimal and suborbital spines are indistinct, normally being very small spines and frequently being blunt, bony protuberances. There is no clear black blotch on the soft rayed part of the dorsal fin. These fish sometimes have a mottled blackish and reddish colour, but they can make wide changes to their colour and pattern. | This species attains a maximum known total length of 12 cm (4.7 in).

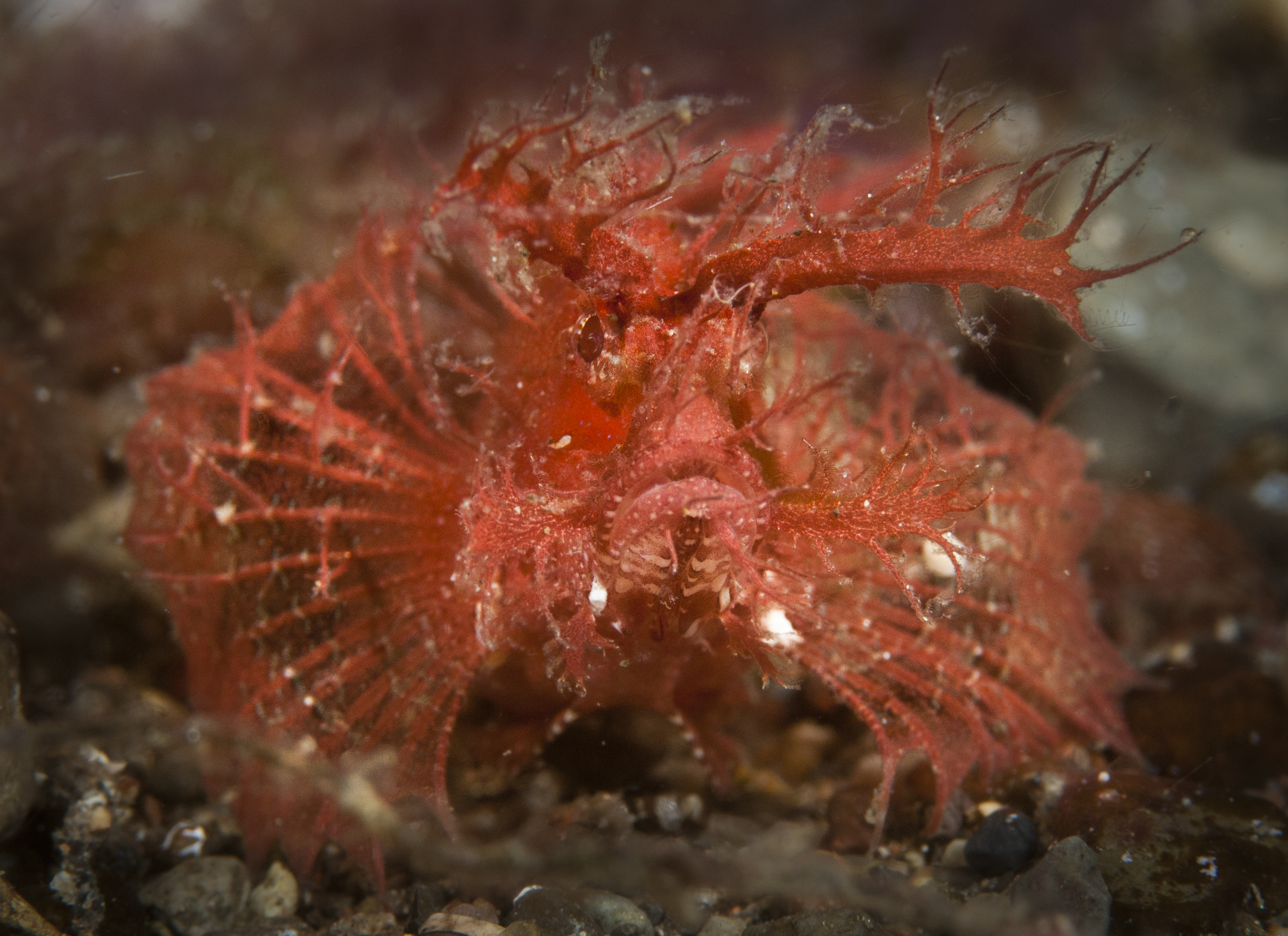
Ambon scorpionfish near Alor Island, Indonesia

== Distribution and habitat ==
Pteroidichthys amboinensis is found in the Red Sea, through the Indian Oceamnand into the western Pacific Ocean as far east as Fiji, north to southern Japan and south to Australia. This is a demersal fish which is found at depths between 7 and 43 m (23 and 141 ft), over soft substrates and among algae.

== Biology ==
Pteroidichthys amboinensis is a solitary ambush predator which is camouflaged to blend in to its habitat,feeding on crustaceans and small fish. This fish has venom bearing spines and the venom is highly toxic and, in some circumstances, invenomation can be fatal to humans.

== Utilisation ==
Pteroidichthys amboinensis is a popular species in the aquarium trade but it is rare and as a result commands high prices.
