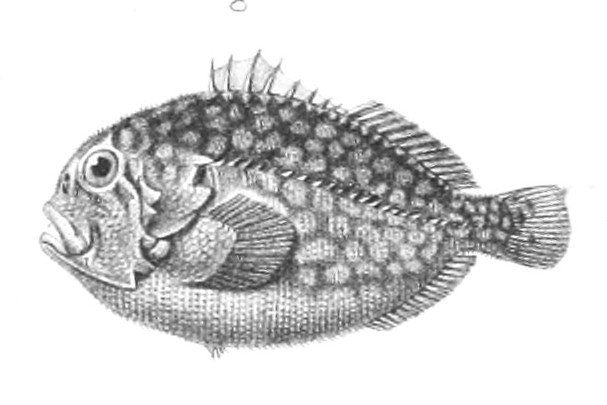
- Spotted croucher (Caracanthus madagascariensis)

Scientific classification
- Kingdom: Animalia
- Phylum: Chordata
- Class: Actinopterygii
- Order: Perciformes
- Family: Scorpaenidae
- Subfamily: Caracanthinae; T. N. Gill, 1885
- Genus: Caracanthus; Krøyer, 1845

Type species
- Caracanthus typicus Krøyer, 1845

= Caracanthus =

Genus of fishes

Caracanthus, the coral crouchers, or orbicular velvetfishes, are a genus of ray-finned fishes. They live in coral reefs of the tropical Indo-Pacific. This genus is the only member of the monotypic subfamily Caracanthinae, part of the family Scorpaenidae.

== Taxonomy ==
Caracanthus was first formally described as a monotypic genus in 1845 by the Danish zoologist Henrik Nikolai Krøyer when he described the new species the Hawaiian orbicular velvetfish (Caracanthus typicus). The genus is the only genus in the monotypic subfamily Caracanthinae within the family Scorpaenidae. Molecular studies have found that the Caracanthinae should probably be treated as a tribe within the subfamily Scorpaeninae, or possibly included in the tribe Scorpaenini. The genus name is a compound of cara, meaning "head" and acanthus, meaning "thorn" or "spine", an allusion to the strong spines on the infraorbital bone of C. typicus.

== Characteristics ==
Caracanthus fishes have an oval, laterally compressed body which is covered in small, rough papillae with a small, terminal mouth. There is a single notch in the dorsal fin which has its origin on the nape and which contains between 6 and 8 spines and 11 and 14 soft rays. The anal fin has 2 spines and between 11 and 14 soft rays. There are 12 to 14 rays in the pectoral fins but the pelvic fins are small and barely noticeable, they have a single spine and 2 or 3 small soft rays. There are tiny scales on the head, each bearing a single spine. Like the related velvetfishes, they have a velvety skin. The small pectoral fins are used to wedge themselves into crevices in the coral. These small fishes vary in size from a maximum standard length of 2.9 cm (1.1 in) in C. typicus to a maximum total length of 5 cm (2.0 in) for the other 3 species.

== Species ==
There are currently four recognized species in this genus:

- Caracanthus maculatus (J. E. Gray, 1831) (Spotted coral croucher)
- Caracanthus madagascariensis (Guichenot, 1869) (Spotted croucher)
- Caracanthus typicus Krøyer, 1845 (Hawaiian orbicular velvetfish)
- Caracanthus unipinna (J. E. Gray, 1831) (Pygmy coral croucher)

== Distribution and habitat ==
Caracanthus fishes are found in the Indian and Pacific oceans where they are closely associated with coral, living among the coral branches.
