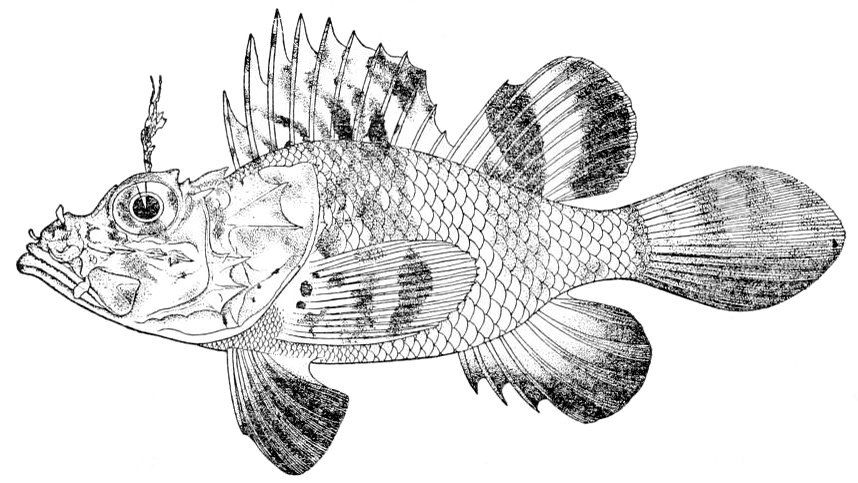

Conservation status
- Least Concern (IUCN 3.1)

Scientific classification
- Kingdom: Animalia
- Phylum: Chordata
- Class: Actinopterygii
- Order: Perciformes
- Family: Scorpaenidae
- Genus: Pteroidichthys
- Species: P. noronhai

Binomial name
- Pteroidichthys noronhai (Fowler, 1938)

Synonyms
- Pteropelor noronhai Fowler, 1938

= Pteroidichthys noronhai =

Species of fish

Pteroidichthys noronhai, Noronha's scorpionfish, is a species of marine ray-finned fish belonging to the family Scorpaenidae, the scorpionfishes. It is found in the central western Pacific Ocean.

== Taxonomy ==
Pteroidichthys noronhai was first formally described as Pteropelor noronhai in 1938 by the American ichthyologist Henry Weed Fowler with the type locality given as near Hong Kong. The genus Pteroelor was subsequently recognised as a synonym of Pteroidichthys. The specific name honours Adolfo César de Noronha who was director of the Museu de História Natural do Funchal in Madeira.

== Description ==
Pteroidichthys noronhai has 12 rigid spines and 8-9soft rays in its dorsal fin with 3 spines and 5 soft rays in its anal fin. It has a relatively short snout, which averages 15.3% of its standard length and is shorter than the distance between the rearmost part of the orbit and the rear edge of the operculum. The rearmost part of the maxilla reached beyond a vertical line through the centre of the pupil. It has poorly developed tentacles above the eyes and just a small number of tentacles on the body and fins. There are well developed spines with pointed tips on the lacrimal and suborbital bones. This species has no clear black blotch on the front part of the soft rayed part of the dorsal fin and attains a maximum total length of 5.6 cm (2.2 in). This is a brown fish with indistinct darker markings on the head and on the back at the base of each part of the dorsal fin. The fin membrane of the spiny part of the dorsal fin is black at its base and grey distally, the membrane of the soft rayed part is blotched with grey and is darker grey terminally, The other fins are greyish with black margins.

== Distribution and habitat ==
Pteroidichthys noronhai is found in the Indo-West Pacific and has been recorded from widely separated localities. It has been found in southern Japan, southern China, Saya de Malha Bank, Taiwan, the Philippines, northwestern Australia, the Chesterfield Islands and Vanuatu. It is a demersal fish found at depths between 50 and 215 m (164 and 705 ft) in areas of sandy substrate.
