= Pontinus tentacularis =

Scientific classification
- Kingdom: Animalia
- Phylum: Chordata
- Class: Actinopterygii
- Order: Perciformes
- Family: Scorpaenidae
- Genus: Pontinus
- Species: P. tentacularis

Binomial name
- Pontinus tentacularis (Fowler, 1938)

Synonyms
- Nemapontinus tentacularis Fowler, 1938; Pontius tentacularis (Fowler, 1938)

Species of fish

Pontinus tentacularis is a species of marine ray-finned fish belonging to the family Scorpaenidae, the scorpionfishes. It is found in the Indian and western Pacific Oceans.

== Taxonomy ==
Pontinus tentacularis was first formally described in 1938 by the American ichthyologist Henry Weed Fowler with the type being collected in region of northern Mindanao in the Philippines. This species is thought by some authorities to be conspecific with P. rhodochrous and maybe P. macrocephalus. The specific name tentacularis means "having tentacles", a reference to the tentacles above the eyes.

== Description ==
Pontinus tentacularishas an oval shaped compressed, body with a compressed head with a large mouth. The body has a depth which is just over a quarter of its standard length. There are well developed spines on the head and there are elongated supraorbital tentacles. The dorsal fin has 12 spines and 9 soft rays, the soft rayed part of the dorsal fin is rounded, The anal fin has 3 spines and 5 soft rays. The caudal fin is rounded. The colour is brown with darker and lighter shading with 5 dark saddle marks along the back but these do not extend onto the dorsal fin. The fins are light brown and the supraorbital tentacle is blackish.

== Distribution and habitat ==
Pontinus tentacularis is found in the Indian Ocean from the Réunion and Mauritius east to the Philippines in the western Pacific Ocean. It is a marine demersal fish which lives at depths between 170 and 600 m (560 and 1,970 ft). This species occurs over seamounts and knolls.

== Observations ==
Pontinus tentacularis is harmless for humans.

== Bibliography ==
- Anonymous, 2001. Database of the collection of fishes of the National Museum of Natural History (Smithsonian Institution). Smithsonian Institution - Division of Fishes.
- Wu, H.L., K.-T. Shao And C.F. Lai (eds.), 1999. Latin-Chinese dictionary of fishes names. The Sueichan Press, Taiwan.
