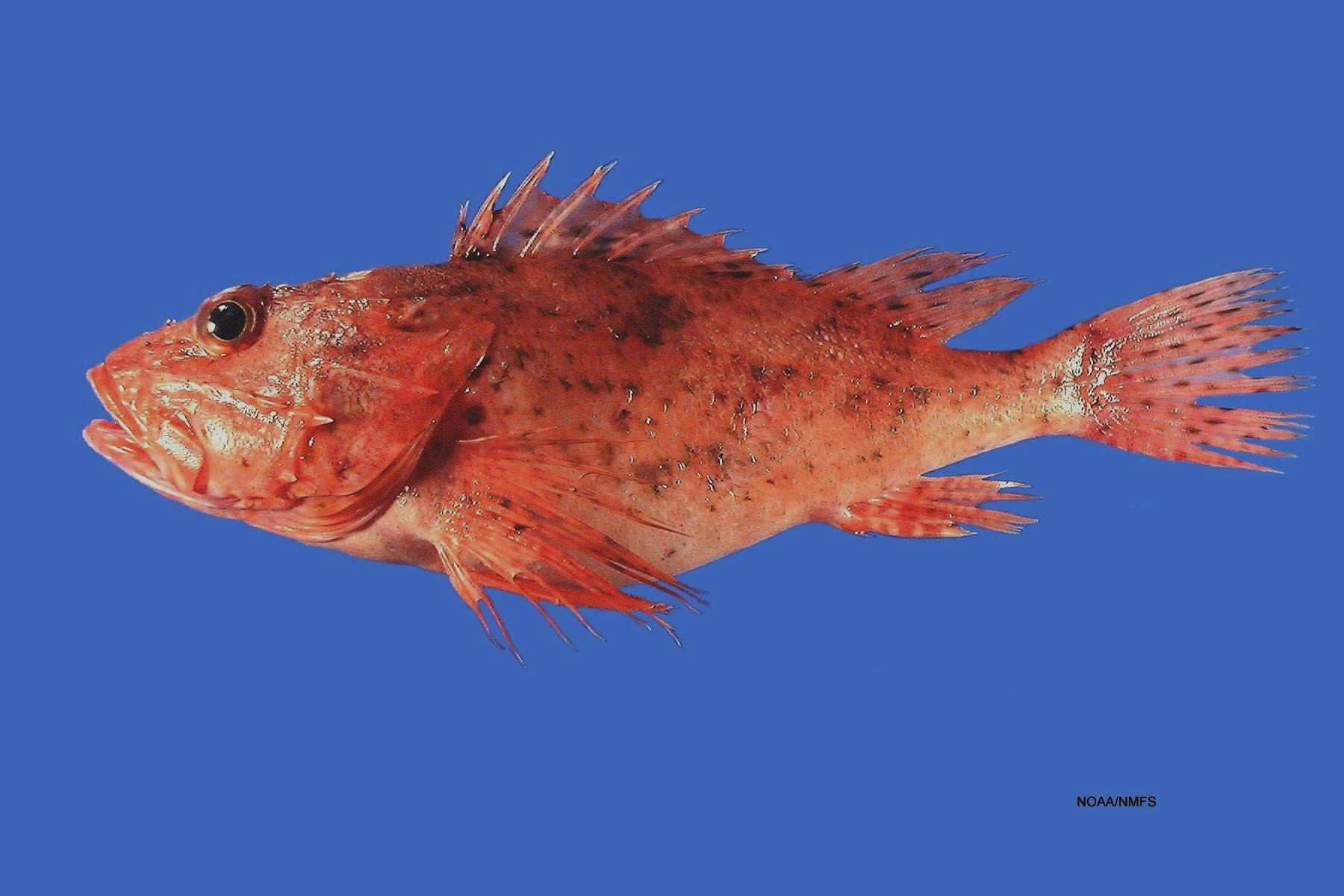

Conservation status
- Least Concern (IUCN 3.1)

Scientific classification
- Kingdom: Animalia
- Phylum: Chordata
- Class: Actinopterygii
- Order: Perciformes
- Family: Scorpaenidae
- Genus: Neomerinthe
- Species: N. hemingwayi

Binomial name
- Neomerinthe hemingwayi Fowler, 1935

= Spinycheek scorpionfish =

Species of fish

The spinycheek scorpionfish (Neomerinthe hemingwayi), also known as Hemingway's scorpionfish, is a species of marine ray-finned fish belonging to the family Scorpaenidae, the scorpionfishes. It is found in the western Atlantic Ocean.

== Taxonomy ==
The spinycheek scorpionfish was first formally described in 1935 by the American ichthyologist Henry Weed Fowler with the type locality given as around 70 miles southeast of Cape May, New Jersey, USA. Fowler described a new genus, Neomerinthe, and designated this species as its type species. The specific name honours the American author and journalist Ernest Hemingway, Fowler stayed with Hemingway in Cuba in 1934 to study billfishes and they became friends. Fowler named the species to mark his appreciation of the help Hemingway gave Fowler for his work on the fishes of the Gulf Stream, although Hemingway was not involved in the collection of this species.

== Description ==
The spinycheek scorpionfish has an elongate and robust body. The nasal bone bears 2 downward directed spines on its lower edge in front of the eye, and another sideways directed spine on its side at the rear. The bony suborbital ridge extends to behind theeye and bears 3 spines. There are teeth on the sides of the roof of the mouth. There is a single, central spine on the preoperculum. The pectoral fins are wedge-shaped with 16–18, typically 17 rays, the longest rays being in the centre and the third to eighth rays are branched at their tips in adults. The dorsal fin has 12 spines and usually has XII, 10.5, rarely 9.5, rays. The rearmost of these rays is divided to its base and is counted as 1.5 rays. The scales on the body are rough and the lateral line extends to the caudal fin. The overall colour is reddish brown with the back and flanks marked with dark mottles and spots. There are 3 dark spots in a group on the lateral line below the soft-rayed part of the dorsal fin. The dorsal fin is also heavily marked with mottles and spots, the caudal fin has dense spotting while the spots on the pectoral fin are irregular. The spinycheek scorpionfish reaches a maximum total length of 40 cm (16 in).

== Distribution and habitat ==
The spinycheek scorpionfish is found in the western Atlantic Ocean. It is found along the eastern coast of the United States from New Jersey to southern Florida and in the Gulf of Mexico from Texas to Campeche, Mexico. This is a demersal species which is found at depths between 45 and 230 m (148 and 755 ft).

== Biology ==
The spinycheek scorpionfish is carnivorous, feeding on benthic invertebrates and smaller fishes. It is oviparous, laying pelagic eggs which hatch into pelagic larvae. There is thick, glandular tissue on the rear of each fin spine which are thought to be venom glands.
