= Scorpaenodes minor =

Conservation status
- Least Concern (IUCN 3.1)

Scientific classification
- Kingdom: Animalia
- Phylum: Chordata
- Class: Actinopterygii
- Order: Perciformes
- Family: Scorpaenidae
- Genus: Scorpaenodes
- Species: S. minor

Binomial name
- Scorpaenodes minor (J. L. B. Smith, 1958)

Synonyms
- Hypomacrus minor J. L. B. Smith, 1958; Hypomacrus brocki Schultz, 1966; Scorpaenodes brocki (Schultz, 1966)

Species of fish

Scorpaenodes minor, the minor scorpionfish or Brock's scorpionfish, is a species of venomous marine ray-finned fish belonging to the family Scorpaenidae, the scorpionfishes. This species is found in the Indian and Pacific Oceans.

== Taxonomy ==
Scorpaenodes minor was first formally described in 1914 as Hypomacrus minor by the South African ichthyologists J. L. B. Smith with the type locality given as Bazaruto Island in Mozambique. The specific name minor means "small", a reference to its being smaller than Hypomacrus africanus, now regarded as a junior synonym of S. albaiensis, which Smith described at the same time.

== Description ==
Scorpaenodes minor has between 12 and 14 spines and 7 to 9 soft rays in its dorsal fin while its anal fin has 3 spines and 5 soft rays. The pectoral fin has 14-16 fin rays, the uppermost 1 or2 rays and the lowest 6 or 7 are thickened. The overall colour is brownish with darker mottled bars on the body, the darkest on the caudal peduncle. There is a dark spot on the preoperculum and the fins are reddish. This species attains a maximum published total length of 5.2 cm (2.0 in).

== Distribution and habitat ==
Scorpaenodes minor has an apparently disjunct distribution. It is found in the southwestern Indian Ocean off Mozambique, with a single record from Tanzania, and in the western Pacific Ocean where it is more widespread and occurs from Indonesia east to French Polynesia, north to Japan and south to Australia. It is found at depths etween 1 and 52 m (3 ft 3 in and 170 ft 7 in) on reef flats and in areas of mixed sand and rubble.

== Biology ==
Scorpaenodes minor is protected by venomous spines. It is a rare, solitary and well camouflaged species.

== Conservation status ==
Scorpaenodes minor has a wide range and has been described as common in the Pacific part of that range. No major threats to its population are known so it is listed as Least Concern by the IUCN.
