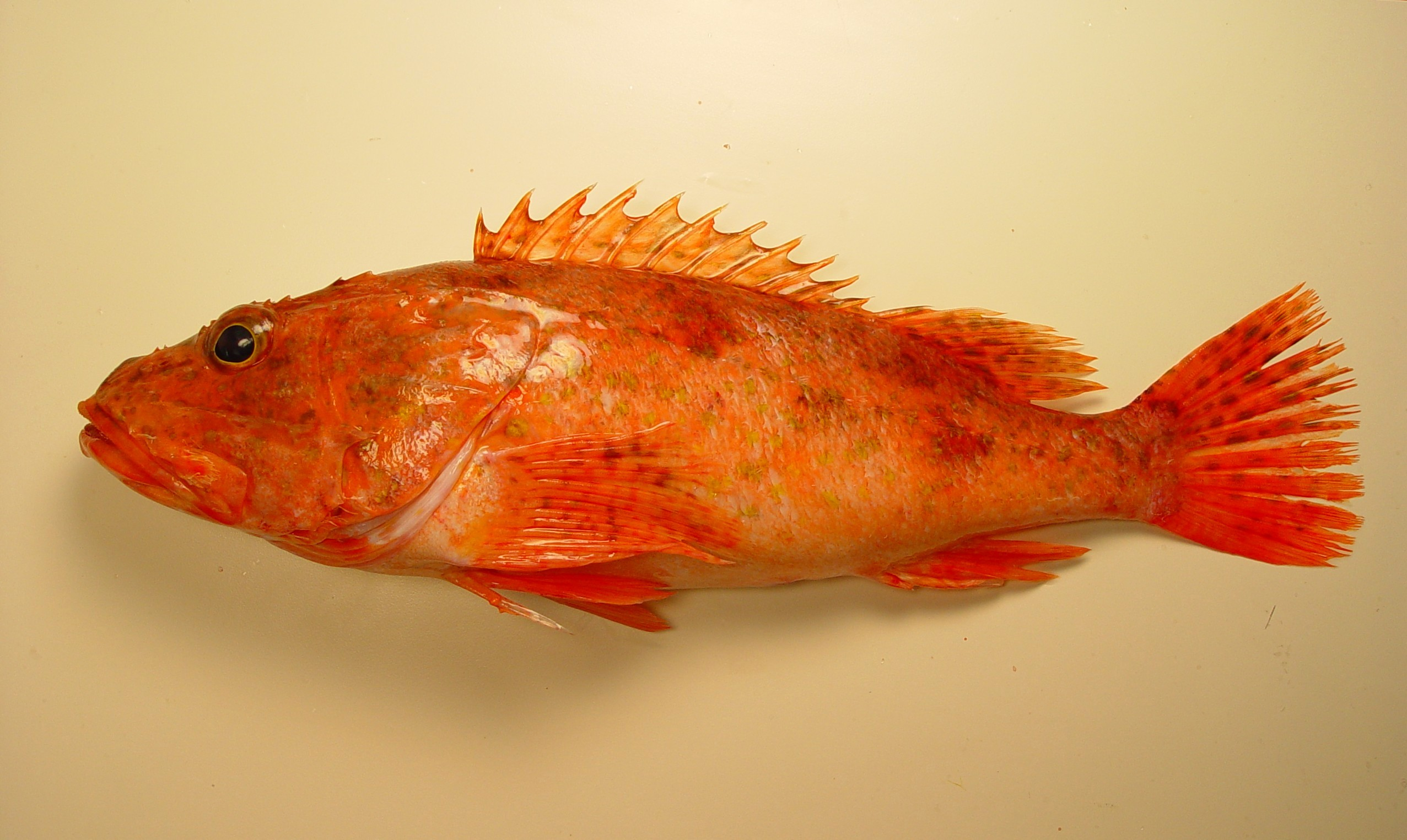
- Neomerinthe hemingwayi

Scientific classification
- Kingdom: Animalia
- Phylum: Chordata
- Class: Actinopterygii
- Order: Perciformes
- Suborder: Scorpaenoidei
- Family: Scorpaenidae
- Subfamily: Scorpaeninae
- Genus: Neomerinthe; Fowler, 1935

Type species
- Neomerinthe hemingwayi Fowler, 1935

= Neomerinthe =

Genus of fishes

Neomerinthe is a genus of marine ray-finned fish belonging to the family Scorpaenidae, the scorpionfishes. They are found in Atlantic, Indian and Pacific Ocean.

== Taxonomy ==
Neomerinthe was first described as a genus in 1935 by the American ichthyologist Henry Weed Fowler, Fowler was describing N. hemingwayi, with a type locality given as off Cape May, New Jersey, which he designated as the type species of a new genus. The genus name is a compound of neo, meaning new, and Merinthe, a synonym of the genus Pontinus, which Fowler thought N. hemingwayi resembled.

== Species ==
Neomerinthe has 12 species classified within it:

- Neomerinthe amplisquamiceps (Fowler, 1938) (Orange scorpionfish)
- Neomerinthe bauchotae Poss & Duhamel, 1991
- Neomerinthe beanorum (Evermann & M. C. Marsh, 1900)
- Neomerinthe costata
- Neomerinthe erostris (Alcock, 1896) (Round scorpionfish)
- Neomerinthe folgori (Postel & C. Roux, 1964) (Folger's scorpionfish)
- Neomerinthe hemingwayi Fowler, 1935 (Spiny-cheek scorpionfish)
- Neomerinthe megalepis (Fowler, 1938)
- Neomerinthe naevosa Motomura, Béarez & Causse, 2011 (Blotched Polynesian scorpionfish)
- Neomerinthe pallidimacula (Fowler, 1938) (Three-striped scorpionfish)
- Neomerinthe parallelaspina
- Neomerinthe procurva L. C. Chen, 1981 (Curved-spine scorpionfish)
- Neomerinthe rufescens (C. H. Gilbert, 1905)

== Characteristics ==
Neomerinthe scorpionfishes have an elongate and robust body> they do not have an occipital pit located o the rear of the eyes but there is a bony suborbital ridge under the eye which is armed with 3 spines. The uppermost spine on the preoperculum is longer than the others. There are teeth on the sides of the roof of the mouth. The dorsal fin has 12 spines and 9-10 soft rays, the rearmost ray being split to its base. The pectoral fin is wedge-shaped with 16-18 rats, the longest rays being in the centre and some of the upper rays are branched at their tips in adults. The scales on the body are rough and the lateral line reaches the base of the caudal fin. These scorpionfishes vary in size from a standard length of 7.1 cm (2.8 in) in the curve-spine scorpionfish (N. procurva to a total length of 59 cm (23 in) in Folger's scorpionfish (N. folgeri).

== Distribution and habitat ==
Neomerinthe scorpionfishes are found throughout the world's oceans except for the Eastern Pacific Ocean. They live in deep water.
