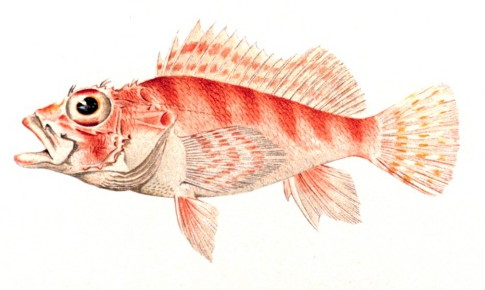
- Spinythroat scorpionfish (P. nematophthalmus)

Scientific classification
- Kingdom: Animalia
- Phylum: Chordata
- Class: Actinopterygii
- Order: Perciformes
- Family: Scorpaenidae
- Subfamily: Scorpaeninae
- Genus: Pontinus; Poey, 1860

Type species
- Pontinus castor Poey, 1860

Synonyms
- Crossoscorpaena Fowler, 1938; Merinthe Snyder, 1904; Nemapontinus Fowler, 1938; Sebastoplus Gill, 1863

= Pontinus =

Pontinus Temporal range: Early Oligocene to Present

Genus of fishes

Pontinus is a genus of marine ray-finned fish belonging to the family Scorpaenidae, the scorpionfishes. The scorpionfishes in this genus are distributed in the tropical and warm temperate parts of the Atlantic, Indian and Pacific oceans.

== Taxonomy ==
Pontinus was first described as a genus in 1860 by the Cuban zoologist Felipe Poey y Aloy when he was describing the longsnout scorpionfish (P. castor), which he had collected at Havana. This species was the only species Poey definitely placed within the new genus it is its type species by monotypy. The genus name from is derived from pontis, meaning "bridge", an allusion to the suborbital stay, or ridge, which is found in all the species in the subfamily Scorpaeninae.

== Species ==
There are currently 19 recognized species in this genus:

- Pontinus accraensis Norman, 1935 (Ghanean rockfish)
- Pontinus castor Poey, 1860 (Longsnout scorpionfish)
- Pontinus clemensi Fitch, 1955 (Mottled scorpionfish)
- Pontinus corallinus A. Miranda-Ribeiro, 1903
- Pontinus furcirhinus Garman, 1899
- Pontinus helena Eschmeyer, 1965
- Pontinus kuhlii (S. Bowdich, 1825) (Offshore rockfish)
- Pontinus leda Eschmeyer, 1969 (Speckled deepwater scorpionfish)
- Pontinus longispinis Goode & T. H. Bean, 1896 (Longspine scorpionfish)
- Pontinus macrocephalus (Sauvage, 1882) (Large-headed scorpionfish)
- Pontinus nematophthalmus (Günther, 1860) (Spinythroat scorpionfish)
- Pontinus nigerimum Eschmeyer, 1983 (Blacklash scorpionfish)
- Pontinus nigropunctatus (Günther, 1868) (St. Helena deepwater scorpionfish)
- Pontinus rathbuni Goode & T. H. Bean, 1896 (Highfin scorpionfish)
- Pontinus rhodochrous (Günther, 1872)
- Pontinus sierra (C. H. Gilbert, 1890) (Speckled scorpionfish)
- Pontinus strigatus Heller & Snodgrass, 1903 (Stalkeye scorpionfish)
- Pontinus tentacularis (Fowler, 1938)
- Pontinus vaughani Barnhart & C. L. Hubbs, 1946 (Spotback scorpionfish)

== Characteristics ==
Pontinus scorpionfishes have very bony heads. The head has two preorbital spines over the maxillary, and 3-4 spines on the suborbital ridge, although the first spine on the preorbital bone is frequently absent. There is a supplemental preopercular spine. The uppermost preopercular spine is the longest, with the second preopercular spine being often absent; then the third and fourth are present, but the fifth may be present or absent. They have both vomerine teeth and paltine teeth. The dorsal fin contains 12 spines and 9-10 soft rays, while the anal fin has three spines and five soft rays, with the rearmost ray deeply split. There are 15-20 unbranched fin rays in the pectoral fin. They have a swimbladder. The scales on the body are ctenoid, and the cheek, postorbital area and top of head are all scaled. They do not have an occipital pit. These scorpionfishes vary in size from a total length of 14 cm (5.5 in) in the spinythroat scorpionfish (P. nematophthalmus) to 54.9 cm (21.6 in) in the mottled spinefish (P. clemensi).

== Distribution and habitat ==
Pontinus scorpionfishes are found in tropical and temperate waters of the Atlantic Indian and Pacific oceans. These are demersal fishes.
