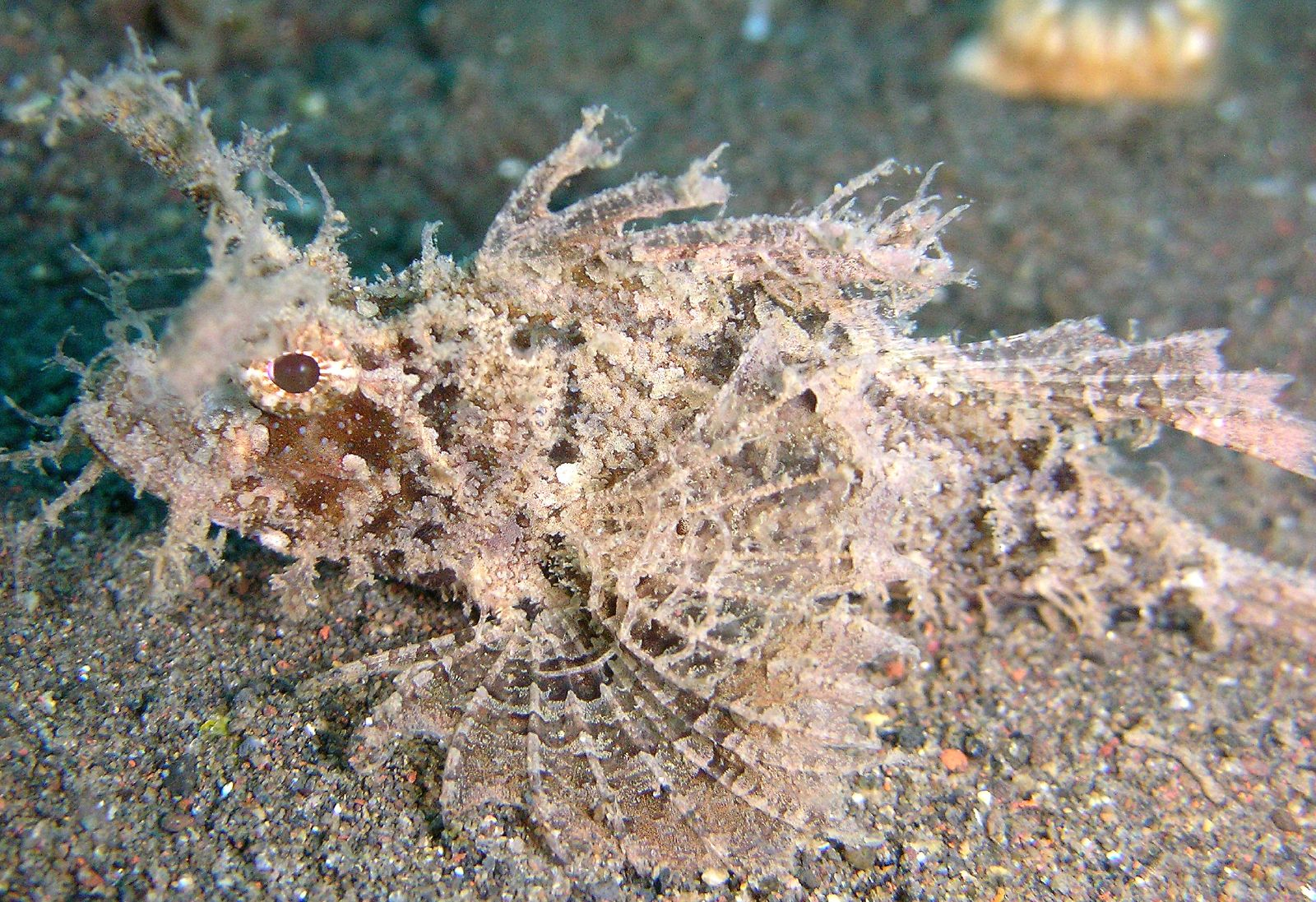
- Pteroidichthys amboinensis

Scientific classification
- Kingdom: Animalia
- Phylum: Chordata
- Class: Actinopterygii
- Order: Perciformes
- Family: Scorpaenidae
- Subfamily: Scorpaeninae
- Genus: Pteroidichthys; Bleeker, 1856

Type species
- Pteroidichthys amboinensis Bleeker, 1856

Synonyms
- Pteropelor Fowler, 1938

= Pteroidichthys =

Genus of fishes

Pteroidichthys is a genus of marine ray-finned fish belonging to the family Scorpaenidae, the scorpionfishes. The scorpionfishes in this genus are distributed in the Indian and Pacific Oceans.

== Taxonomy ==
Pteroidichthys was first described as a genus in 1856 by the Dutch herpetologist, ichthyologist and physician Pieter Bleeker when he described Pteroidichthys amboinensis and he placed it in a monotypic genus. The genus name is a compound of pteroides which means "similar to Pterois", and ichthys meaning "fish". Bleeker thought that this taxon was close to the lionfishes but was distinguished by, among other features, the lack of head spines.

== Species ==
There are currently 4 recognized species in this genus:

- Pteroidichthys acutus Motomura & Kanade, 2015 (Longsnout weedy scorpionfish)
- Pteroidichthys amboinensis Bleeker, 1856 (Ambon scorpionfish)
- Pteroidichthys caussei Motomura & Kanade, 2015 (Causse's scorpionfish)
- Pteroidichthys noronhai (Fowler, 1938) (Noronha's scorpionfish)

== Characteristics ==
Pteroidichthys scorpionfishes have a body which is strongly compressed and elongated, the width of the body is equivalent to 10–24% of their standard length while its depth is equivalent to 28–40% of its standard length. They have 12 spines in their dorsal fin and there are no black blotches on the lower part of the caudal fin. These scorpionfishes vary in size from a maximum standard length of 4.1 cm (1.6 in) in P. acutus to a total length of 12 cm (4.7 in) in P. amboinensis.

== Distribution and habitat ==
Pteroidichthys scorpionfishes are found in the Indian Ocean and the western Pacific Ocean, occurring in the Red Sea as well. It is found as far north as Japan and south to Australia. They are demersal fishes which occur over soft substrates. These fishes are found in depths that range from 7 to 400 m (23 to 1,312 ft).

== Biology ==
Pteroidichthys scorpionfishes are ambush predators and tend to be solitary fishes.
