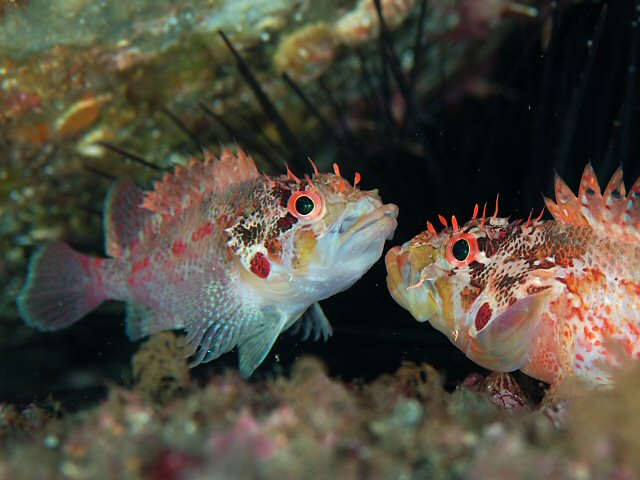

Conservation status
- Least Concern (IUCN 3.1)

Scientific classification
- Kingdom: Animalia
- Phylum: Chordata
- Class: Actinopterygii
- Order: Perciformes
- Family: Scorpaenidae
- Genus: Scorpaenodes
- Species: S. evides

Binomial name
- Scorpaenodes evides (D. S. Jordan & W. F. Thompson, 1914)

Synonyms
- Scorpaenodes littoralis (Tanaka, 1917); Sebastella littoralis S. Tanaka, 1917; Thysanichthys evides D. S. Jordan & W. F. Thompson, 1914

= Scorpaenodes evides =

Species of fish

Scorpaenodes evides, the cheekspot scorpionfish, little scorpionfish or shore scorpionfish, is a species of venomous marine ray-finned fish belonging to the family Scorpaenidae, the scorpionfishes. This species is found in the Indian and Pacific Oceans.

== Taxonomy ==
Scorpaenodes evides was first formally described in 1914 as Thysanichthys evides by the American ichthyologists David Starr Jordan and William Francis Thompson with the type locality given as Misaki in Japan. However, this taxon was not reported subsequently and a re-examination of the holotype in 2010 showed that this was the same species as the widely distributed Sebastella littoralis which had been described in 1917 by the Japanese ichthyologist Shigeho Tanaka, also from Misaki, and that this taxon should be placed in the genus Scorpaenodes, with S. littoralis being a junior synonym of S. evides. This study also recognised no less than seven separate geographic populations, some of which may be subspecies and that the nominate subspecies S. e. evides may only occur Japan and Taiwan. The specific name evides means "pretty", the authors did not explain their choice of name.

== Description ==
Scorpaenodes evides has 13 spines and 9 soft rays in its dorsal fin with 3 spines and 5 soft rays in its anal fin. The front of the body is not strobly compressed but compression increases towards the caudal fin. The body is moderately deep, its depth being smaller than the length of the head. There is a tentacle on the front nostril. This species colour is brownish to pink or reddish with a dark blotch on the ventral part of the operculumthe fins have red spots and there are leaf-like skin flaps on the head. This species grows to 11 cm (4.3 in) in total length.

== Distribution and habitat ==
Scoraenodes evides has a wide Indo-Pacific distribution.In Africa it is found on the eastern coast of South Africa and in the Red Sea, through the Indian and Pacific Oceans as far east as Easter Island and Hawaii. It occurs as far north as southern Japan, and as far south as Australia where it is found from the Houtman Abrolhos of Western Australia along the northern coasts of Australia as far as Jervis Bay in New South Wales, as well as at Lord Howe Island and Elizabeth and Middleton reefs. This species is a demersal fish found mainly in shallow tropical marine waters at depths of 1 to 40 m (3 ft 3 in to 131 ft 3 in), on rocky and coral reefs. It is frequently seen upside down on the roofs of caves.

== Biology ==
The spines in the dorsal fin are venomous.
