= Idiastion =

Scientific classification
- Kingdom: Animalia
- Phylum: Chordata
- Class: Actinopterygii
- Order: Perciformes
- Family: Scorpaenidae
- Subfamily: Scorpaeninae
- Genus: Idiastion; Eschmeyer, 1965

Type species
- Idiastion kyphos Eschmeyer, 1965

Genus of fishes

Idiastion is a small genus of marine ray-finned fish belonging to the family Scorpaenidae, the scorpionfishes. They are found in the Atlantic and Pacific oceans.

== Taxonomy ==
Idiastion was first described as a genus by the American ichthyologist William N. Eschmeyer in 1965 when he was describing its type species, Idiastion kyphos, from the southeastern Caribbean Sea, between Venezuela and Grenada. Subsequently two more species have been added to the genus from the Pacific Ocean. The genus is classified within the tribe Scorpaenini in the subfamily Scorpaeninae of the scorpionfish family Scorpaenidae. The genus name Idiastion is the Greek word meaning "hermit" or "recluse", alluding to the rarity of the scorpionfishes at the depths at which Idiastion was collected from.

== Species ==
There are currently three recognized species in this genus:

- Idiastion hageyi McCosker, 2008(Galapagos humpback scorpionfish)
- Idiastion kyphos Eschmeyer, 1965 (Sharpcheek scorpionfish)
- Idiastion pacificum Ishida & Amaoka, 1992 (Flame humpback scorpionfish)

== Characteristics ==
Idiastion scorpionfishes have a deep body, deepest behind the head with a hump backed shape. They have well-developed, robust spines which can have more than one point. They do not have an occipital pit behind their large eyes which have a suborbital ridge armed with between 5 and 8 spines. There are 4 spines on the preoperculum with the uppermost one being the longest and being located some distance from the other 3 spines. They have small, simple teeth on the jaws and the roof of the mouth. They have 12 spines and 9 soft rays in the dorsal fin and 3 spines and 5 soft rays in the anal fin. The pectoral fin has 17–19 rays, the central rays being the longest and the uppermist ray and bottom 7–9 rays are unbranched with the lower ones being fleshy with their tips protruding beyond the membrane. They have a complete lateral line with tubes on the scales and a small swim bladder. These scorpionfishes are small fishes with standard lengths ranging from 5.3 cm (2.1 in) in I. kyphos and 12.3 cm (4.8 in) in I. pacificum.

== Distribution and habitat ==
Idiastion scorpionfishes are found in the western Atlantic Ocean (I. kyphos), the Galápagos Islands (I. hageyi) and around Japan and over the Emperor Seamounts in the northwestern Pacific (I. pacificum). They live close to the bottom over reefs and soft substrates.
