= Ursinoscorpaenopsis =

Scientific classification
- Kingdom: Animalia
- Phylum: Chordata
- Class: Actinopterygii
- Order: Perciformes
- Family: Scorpaenidae
- Subfamily: Scorpaeninae
- Genus: Ursinoscorpaenopsis; Nakabo & Yamada, 1996
- Species: U. kitai

Binomial name
- Ursinoscorpaenopsis kitai Nakabo & Yamada, 1996

Species of fish

Ursinoscorpaenopsis is a monotypic genus of marine ray-finned fish belonging to the family Scorpaenidae, the scorpionfishes. Its only species, Ursinoscorpaenopsis kitai, is native to the Pacific Ocean waters around Japan. This species grows to a length of 24 cm (9.4 in).

Ursinoscorpaenopsis kitai was first formally described in 1996 by Tetsuji Nakabo and Umeyoshi Yamada and is known only from its type, which was collected in the East China Sea from a depth of 138 m (453 ft). The genus name Ursinoscorpaeanopsis refers to its "bearlike shape" and is similar to Scorpaenopsis. The specific name honours the collector of the type Tsugiyoshi Kita of Nagasaki.

The genus Ursinoscorpaenopsis differs from other scorpionfish genera by having a paranuchal spine, a supplemental spine on the last suborbital spine and non-fleshy, branched fin rays in the pectoral fin rays. It also has an orange-reddish body, lacks any teeth on the palatine, has a swimbladder, and possesses a supraneural and 5 unfused hypurals. This genus appears to be one of the more basal genera in the family Scorpaenidae.
