= Phenacoscorpius =

Scientific classification
- Kingdom: Animalia
- Phylum: Chordata
- Class: Actinopterygii
- Order: Perciformes
- Family: Scorpaenidae
- Subfamily: Scorpaeninae
- Genus: Phenacoscorpius; Fowler, 1938

Type species
- * Phenacoscorpius megalops Fowler, 1938

Genus of fishes

Phenacoscorpius, the no-lined scorpionfishes, is a genus of marine ray-finned fish belonging to the family Scorpaenidae, the scorpionfishes. They are native to the western Atlantic, Pacific and Indian oceans.

== Taxonomy ==
Phenacoscorpius was first described as a genus in 1938 by the American ichthyologist Henry Weed Fowler when he described Phenacoscorpius megalops from the Philippines which he designated as the type species of the new monotypic genus. The genus name is a compound of phenaco, which means "cheat", an allusion to the incomplete lateral line of P. megalops, and scorpius, meaning "scorpion", as this is a scorpionfish.

== Species ==
Phenacoscorpius contains, as of January 2022, seven recognized species:

- Phenacoscorpius adenensis Norman, 1939
- Phenacoscorpius eschmeyeri Parin & Mandritsa, 1992
- Phenacoscorpius longilineatus Motomura, Causse & Struthers, 2012
- Phenacoscorpius longirostris Motomura & Last, 2009 (Longsnout No-line Scorpionfish)
- Phenacoscorpius mccoskeri Wibowo & Motomura, 2017 (McCosker's no-line scorpionfish)
- Phenacoscorpius megalops Fowler, 1938 (Noline scorpionfish)
- Phenacoscorpius nebris Eschmeyer, 1965 (Short-tube scorpionfish)

== Characteristics ==
Phenacoscorpius scorpionfishes have very bony heads armed with strong spines and without an occipital pit on the top of the head behind the eyes. The suborbital ridge has 5-6 spines. There are teeth on the sides of the roof of the mouth but none in the front. The uppermost preopercular spine is the largest. There are 12 spines and 9 soft rays in the dorsal fin and 3 spines and 5 soft rays in the anal fin. The pectoral fins have 15-17 rays with the upper rays being branched, the central rays being the longest and the lower rays having their tips exposed. The lateral line is incomplete being made up of only 4-5 pored scales at the front. These scorpionfishes vary in size from a standard length of 6.3 cm (2.5 in) in P. longirostris and a total length of 13.5 cm (5.3 in) in P. megalops.

== Distribution and habitat ==
Phenacoscorpius scorpionfishes have an almost circumtropical distribution and are mainly found in the Indian and Pacific Oceans, with one species in the western Atlantic Ocean, although they are not found in the eastern Atlantic Ocean.These are deepwater fishes typically found deeper then 500 m (1,600 ft).
