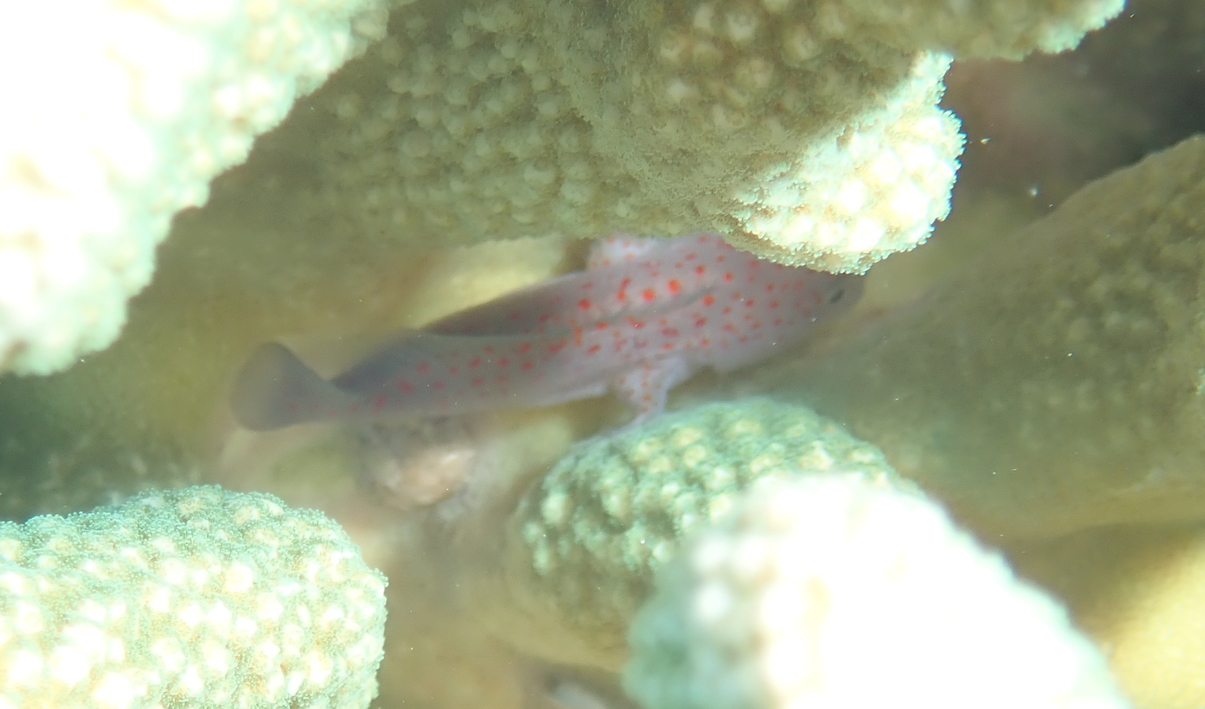

Conservation status
- Near Threatened (IUCN 3.1)

Scientific classification
- Kingdom: Animalia
- Phylum: Chordata
- Class: Actinopterygii
- Division: Teleostei
- Order: Perciformes
- Family: Scorpaenidae
- Genus: Caracanthus
- Species: C. typicus

Binomial name
- Caracanthus typicus Krøyer, 1845

= Caracanthus typicus =

Species of fish

Caracanthus typicus, the Hawaiian orbicular velvetfish, is a species of marine ray-finned fish, an orbicular velvetfish, belonging to the family Scorpaenidae. This species is endemic to the Hawaiian Islands.

== Taxonomy ==
Caracanthus typicus was first formally described in 1845 by the Danish zoologist Henrik Nikolai Krøyer with the type locality given as the Hawaiian Islands. Kroyer also described a new monotypic genus, Caracanthus, when he described this species, so it is the type species of that genus and of the subfamily Caracanthinae of the family Scorpaenidae. The specific name typicus denotes that this species is the type species of its genus.

== Description ==
Caracanthus typicus has a laterally compressed, disc-shaped, gray body covered with small red spots. This species has skin covered with papillae that produce a velvety texture. The closely related Caracanthus maculatus tends to have smaller and more numerous spots that are dark red to dark brown. The Hawaiian orbicular velvetfish can reach a length of 4 cm (1.6 in).

== Distribution and habitat ==
Caracanthus typicus is endemic to the Hawaiian Islands in the eastern central Pacific Ocean where it inhabits reefs as a benthic species which usually lives among the branches of the cauliflower coral (Pocillopora meandrina).

== Biology ==
Caracanthus typicus will move deeper into the coral if disturbed and it has venomous spines in its fins.

== Conservation ==
Caracanthus typicus is endemic to the Hawaiian Islands, being associated with coral reefs, and, in particular, the cauliflower coral. Based on the area of coral reef in the Hawaiian Islands, this species has a very limited distribution which is near to the threshold for the IUCN to classify it as Vulnerable. There have been localised declines in coral cover due to overfishing, climate change, pollution and invasive species in Hawaii and it is thought that there has been a continuing decline in habitat quality. Due to the ain threat of habitat degradation, it is estimated that this species occurs at between 2 and 6 locations and the IUCN list this species as Near Threatened.
