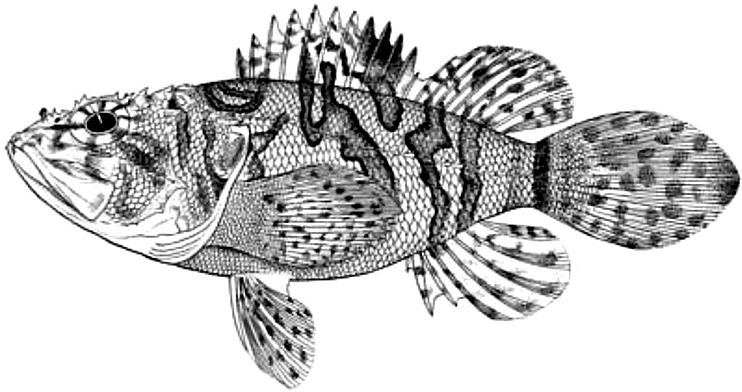

Scientific classification
- Kingdom: Animalia
- Phylum: Chordata
- Class: Actinopterygii
- Order: Perciformes
- Family: Scorpaenidae
- Subfamily: Scorpaeninae
- Genus: Hoplosebastes; P. J. Schmidt, 1929
- Species: H. armatus

Binomial name
- Hoplosebastes armatus P. J. Schmidt, 1929

Synonyms
- Hoplosebastes pristigenys Fowler, 1938

= Flower scorpionfish =

Species of fish

The flower scorpionfish (Hoplosebastes armatus) is a species of marine ray-finned fish belonging to the family Scorpaenidae, the scorpionfishes. It is native to the Pacific Ocean around Japan and to the East China Sea. This species grows to a length of 12.3 centimetres (4.8 in) SL. This species is the only known member of its genus.
