= Spotfin scorpionfish =

Conservation status
- Data Deficient (IUCN 3.1)

Scientific classification
- Kingdom: Animalia
- Phylum: Chordata
- Class: Actinopterygii
- Division: Teleostei
- Order: Perciformes
- Family: Scorpaenidae
- Subfamily: Scorpaeninae
- Genus: Neoscorpaena; Mandritsa, 2001
- Species: N. nielseni

Binomial name
- Neoscorpaena nielseni (J. L. B. Smith, 1964)

Synonyms
- Sebastapistes neilseni J. L. B. Smith, 1964; Neomerinthe neilseni (J. L. B. Smith, 1964)

Species of fish

The spotfin scorpionfish (Neoscorpaena nielseni) is a species of marine ray-finned fish belonging to the family Scorpaenidae, the scorpionfishes. It is known from the western Indian Ocean This species is the only known member of the genus Neoscorpanea.

== Taxonomy ==
The spotfin scorpionfish was first formally described in 1964 as Sebastapistes neilseni by the South African ichthyologist J. L. B. Smith with the type locality given as off Durban in South Africa. In 2001 the Russian biologist Sergey Mandritsa placed this species in the monotypic genus Neoscorpaena. The genus name translates as "new Scorpaena", as this species is similar to the fishes in the genus Scorpaena but is distinguished by having a slit behind the gill arches. The specific name honours the Danish zoologist Jørgen G. Nielsen of the Zoological Museum of Copenhagen in recognition of the assistance he gave to Smith's research.

== Description ==
The spotfin scorpionfish has a dorsal fin which contains 12 spines and 9-10, typically 10 soft rays. The anal fin has 3 spines and 5 soft rays. There are 18 fin rays in the pectoral fins. The large head has a length equivalent to 45.9-48.6% of the standard length while the large eyes have an orbital diameter of 12.0-17.1% of standard length, although this decreases markedly as the fish grows. There is no lateral lacrimal spine the anterior lacrimal spine is rounded and is not shaped like a spine while the posterior lacrimal spine has a triangular shape. There are 4-8 suborbital spines. The preoperculum p has 5 spines with an extra spine on uppermost spine. The preocular, supraocular, postocular and tympanic spines are well developed. The interorbital ridges are connected at the rear to the bases of the tympanic spines and the parietal spines absent. The nuchal spine is large and well developed and starts at the posterior end of the tympanic spine. There are no interorbital, coronal or pretympanic spines. The back of the head is almost flat, lacking an occipital pit. There are 2-13 sphenotic spines and the parietal, lower posttemporal and supracleithral spines are all well developed. There is no upper posttemporal spine, although a small spine can be found between the nuchal and lower posttemporal spines. The maxilla extends to just short of or as far as the rear edge of the orbit. There vomerine and palatine teeth. The pectoral fin is bilobed. The overall colour is reddish with yellow blotches on the upper head and body. There is normally a dark blotch near the rear of the spiny part of the dorsal fin. This species grows to a maximum recorded standard length of 21.6 cm (8.5 in).

== Distribution and habitat ==
The spotfin scorpionfish is found in the southwestern Indian Ocean. It occurs off the eastern coast of South Africa, as well as Madagascar, the Seychelles, Mauritius and Réunion. This is a demersal fish and it is found at depths between 40 and 507 m (131 and 1,663 ft). Little is known about the biology of this species.
