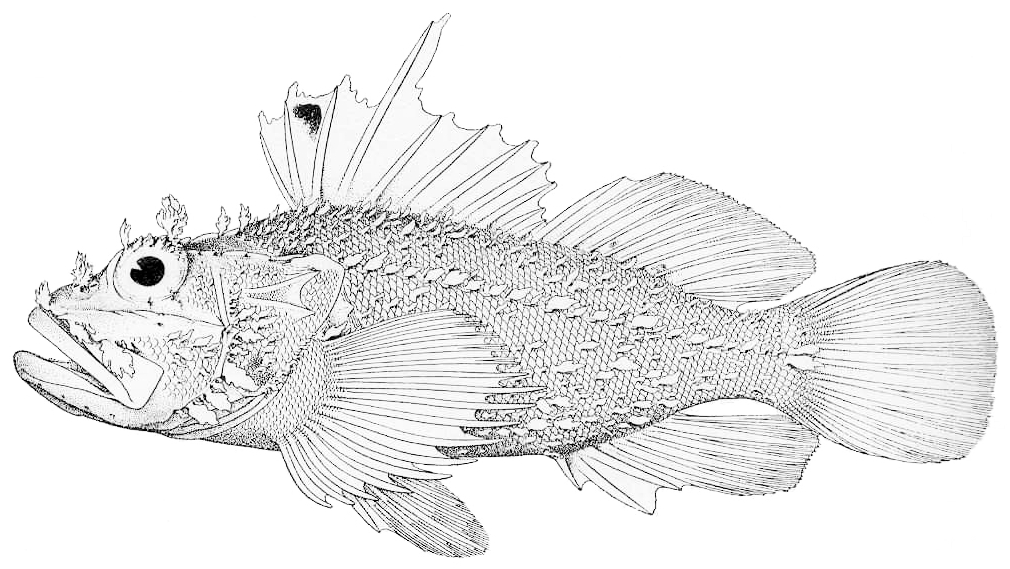

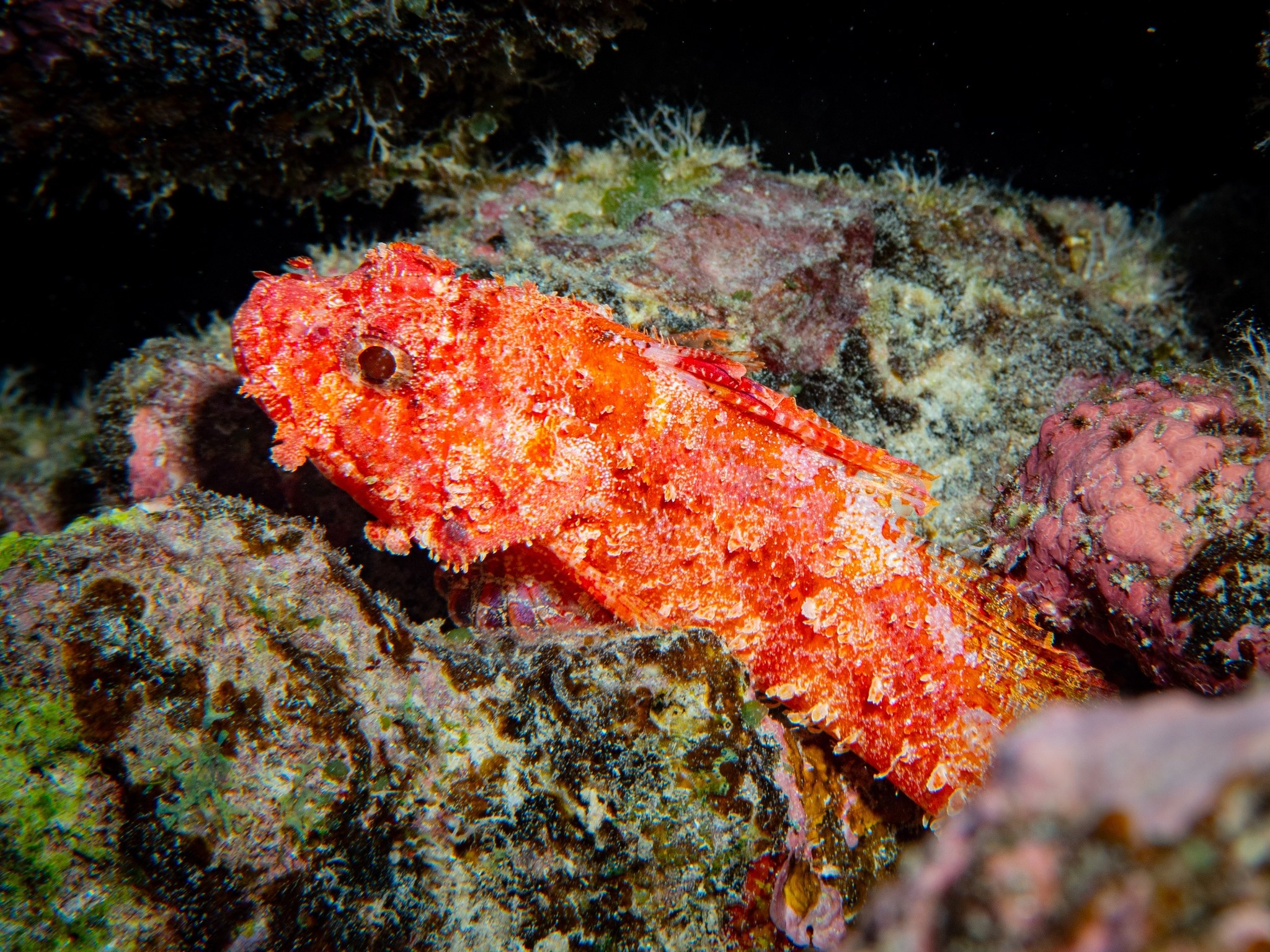
- Decoy scorpionfish on reef near Kailua-Kona, Hawaii.

Conservation status
- Least Concern (IUCN 3.1)

Scientific classification
- Kingdom: Animalia
- Phylum: Chordata
- Class: Actinopterygii
- Order: Perciformes
- Family: Scorpaenidae
- Subfamily: Scorpaeninae
- Genus: Iracundus; Jordan & Evermann
- Species: I. signifer

Binomial name
- Iracundus signifer Jordan & Evermann, 1903

Synonyms
- Scorpaena asperella Bennett, 1828; Sebastapistes asperella (Bennett, 1828)

= Decoy scorpionfish =

Species of fish

The decoy scorpionfish (Iracundus signifer) is a species of marine ray-finned fish belonging to the family Scorpaenidae, the scorpionfishes. It is native to the Western Indian and Pacific oceans. A non-migratory species, I. signifer can be observed in close association with coral reefs at depths of from 10 to 70 metres (33 to 230 ft). This species grows to a length of 13 centimeters (5.1 in) TL. This species is the only known member of its genus and can be distinguished by its unique prey-luring behavior.

== Taxonomy ==
The decoy scorpionfish is a ray-finned fish, a member of the class Actinopterygii, belonging to the family Scorpaenidae, also known as the scorpionfish, which are aptly named due to many of its species possessing the capacity to produce a venomous mucus on the tips of their spines. This species was first formally described in 1903 by the American ichthyologists David Starr Jordan and Barton Warren Evermann, with the type locality given as Oahu in Hawaii. The decoy scorpionfish is the sole member of the genus Iracundus. The genus name Iracundus means "wrathful" and is an allusion to the red color of this species. The specific name signifer is a compound of signa meaning "mark" and fera which means "to bear", a reference to the black spot on the spiny part of the dorsal fin.

== Distribution and habitat ==
The decoy scorpionfish is native to the tropical coral reefs of both the Indian and Pacific oceans. In the Indian Ocean, I. signifer has been observed along the coast of South Africa, as well as the islands of Mauritius and Reunion. In the Pacific, it has been observed in the Hawaiian islands, the Ryukyu islands, and Taiwan. Like other scorpionfishes, I. signifer is a benthic organism, remaining in close proximity to the seafloor and coral reef for shelter, as well as camouflage from predators and prey. Its most preferred habitat is within the cavernous, rubble-laden inlets underneath the edges of the coral reefs.

== Morphology ==
The decoy scorpionfish is a small, spiny fish, much like most other members of the family Scorpaenidae. The reddish-orange to white coloring covering most of the fish's body serves as camouflage along the Indo-pacific coral reefs where it resides. The decoy scorpionfish has a stocky, football-like body that can reach up to 13 cm (total length), which is an average length for species within the Scorpaenidae family. Its body is covered in small to medium-sized venomous spines, a characteristic trait of all scorpionfish, the venom from which can be lethal to humans. These spines protrude from nearly everywhere across the fish's body, including ones protruding from around the eyes, along a fleshy membrane surrounding the head, and between the scales of the back, concentrated mostly in a stripe on each side running laterally to the spine. The dorsal fins are broad and fan-like, with deep notches in the membrane between each spine. Like many other members of the family Scorpaenidae, I. signifer can actively change the color of their bodies in response to their environment. This behavior usually involves displaying more dull colors when attempting to camouflage itself, and flashing brighter colors in the presence of a predator.

Likely the most unique aspect of this fish is the patterning of the dorsal fin itself. The fourth dorsal spine is nearly twice the length of the others, and there exists a distinct black mark appearing somewhere along the membrane between the first and third dorsal spines, with the combination of the two traits resulting in the dorsal fin having the appearance of an even smaller fish. I. signifer utilizes this morphological feature in a coordinated luring mechanism not seen in any other members of the Scorpaenidae family.

== Luring behavior ==
The decoy scorpionfish has been noted on multiple accounts to display a unique prey-luring mechanism, involving the movement of its dorsal fin. The form of I. signifer's dorsal fin strongly resembles that of a small fish, with the fourth dorsal spine representing the dorsal fin of the lure fish, and a small black dot between dorsal spines 1-3 representing the eye. The decoy scorpionfish has developed a method of moving this fin so that it also behaves like a fish would. By moving the first dorsal spine in a figure-eight like pattern, the rest of the fin follows in a wave-like pattern of movement, while also moving laterally from side to side. This motion causes the dorsal fin to resemble a small fish gyrating in the water. The fish-like shape of the fin is emphasized by the subtle movement between the first and second dorsal spines, which continually move closer and then further apart, mimicking the opening and closing of a fish's mouth. Another factor to this behavior is the active color-changing between the fin and body, as during luring, the normally deep red dorsal fin becomes much more intense in color, and the body of the fish conversely becomes more dull as a camouflage mechanism.
