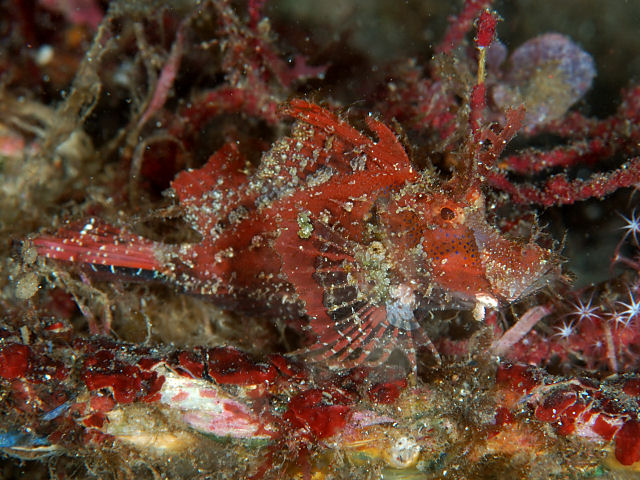

Scientific classification
- Kingdom: Animalia
- Phylum: Chordata
- Class: Actinopterygii
- Division: Teleostei
- Order: Perciformes
- Family: Scorpaenidae
- Subfamily: Scorpaeninae
- Genus: Hipposcorpaena; Fowler, 1938
- Species: H. filamentosus

Binomial name
- Hipposcorpaena filamentosus Fowler, 1938

Synonyms
- Hipposcorpaena filamentosa Fowler, 1938; Rhinopias filamentosus (Fowler, 1938)

= Filamentous scorpionfish =

Species of Fish

The filamentous scorpionfish (Hipposcorpaena filamentosus) is a species of marine ray-finned fish belonging to the family Scorpaenidae, the scorpionfishes. It is found in the Indo-West Pacific. It is the only species in the monotypic genus Hipposcorpaena.

== Taxonomy ==
The filamentous scorpionfish was first formally described in 1938 by the American zoologist Henry Weed Fowler with the type locality given as off Linao Point in Davao Gulf in the Philippines. It is the only species in the monospecific genus Hipposcorpaena. The genus name is the word hippo, which means "horse", used as a prefix of Scorpaena, the type genus of the family Scorpaenidae; this is thought to be an allusion to the sloping profile of the head, like that of a horse. The specific name filamentosus means "filamented" and likely alludes to the thin flaps on the head and body.

== Description ==
The filamentous scorpionfish has a strongly compressed body with large head a which has a concave upper edge to its snout. The body has a depth which would fit into its standard length 2.5 to 2.8 times. There are 11-12 spines and 9-10 soft rays in the dorsal fin and 2 spines and 6 soft rays in the anal fin. There are 14 rays in the pectoral fin and there are deep incisions in the membranes between the lower 7 rays which are equal to one-third to one-half the length of each ray, creating filament-like structures. There are flaps of skin on the snout, chin, lower cheek, margin of the preoperculum and above the eye. The overall colour is reddish with a whitish snout, 2 wide pale bands on the body and a white band on the posterior of the spiny part of the dorsal fin. This is a small species of scorpionfish with a maximum standard length of 3.5 cm (1.4 in).

== Distribution and habitat ==
The filamentous scorpionfish is found in the Indo-West Pacific region and has been recorded from Bali, Sulawesi, the Timor Sea, Philippines, Papua New Guinea and Japan. In Australian waters it has only been recorded from the Ashmore Reef in the Timor Sea. It is a demersal fish which is found at depths between 10 and 95 m (33 and 312 ft) on silty inshore reefs.
