= Pogonoscorpius =

Conservation status
- Data Deficient (IUCN 3.1)

Scientific classification
- Kingdom: Animalia
- Phylum: Chordata
- Class: Actinopterygii
- Order: Perciformes
- Family: Scorpaenidae
- Subfamily: Scorpaeninae
- Genus: Pogonoscorpius; Regan, 1908
- Species: P. sechellensis

Binomial name
- Pogonoscorpius sechellensis Regan, 1908

Species of fish

Pogonoscorpius is a genus of marine ray-finned fish belonging to the family Scorpaenidae, the scorpionfishes. It is a monotypic genus, its ony species is Pogonoscorpius sechellensis which occurs in the western Indian Ocean in the seas around the Seychelles. It is a little known species and, as of 2018, only 2 specimens were known from the Seychelles. It may also occur in the Coral Sea and off Japan and it has been suggested that this taxon is a synonym of Rhinopias argoliba. Others treat it as a valid species and state that it is endemic to the western Indian Ocean.

Pgonoscorpius was first formally described as a genus in 1908 by the British ichthyologist Charles Tate Regan when he described its only species P. sechellensis, of which Regan gave the type locality as from a depth of 37 fathoms in the Seychelles. The type was collected by John Stanley Gardiner. The genus name is a compound of pogon meaning "beard", an allusion to the well developed mental barbel, and scorpius, a "scorpion" indicating that this is a scorpionfish. The specific name indicates that its origin is the Seychelles.

Pogonoscorpius sechellensis is found at depths down to 68 metres (223 ft). This species reaches a length of 5.1 centimetres (2.0 in) SL.

Pogonoscorpius sechellensis is similar to the species in the genus Rhinopias but differ in colouration and in the possession of a mental barbel. It has 12 spines and 9 soft rays in the dorsal fin, the last ray being split and is sometimes counted as 1.5 rays. The anal fin has 3 spines and 5 soft rays. The colour is described a yellowish with reddish tinged fins.
