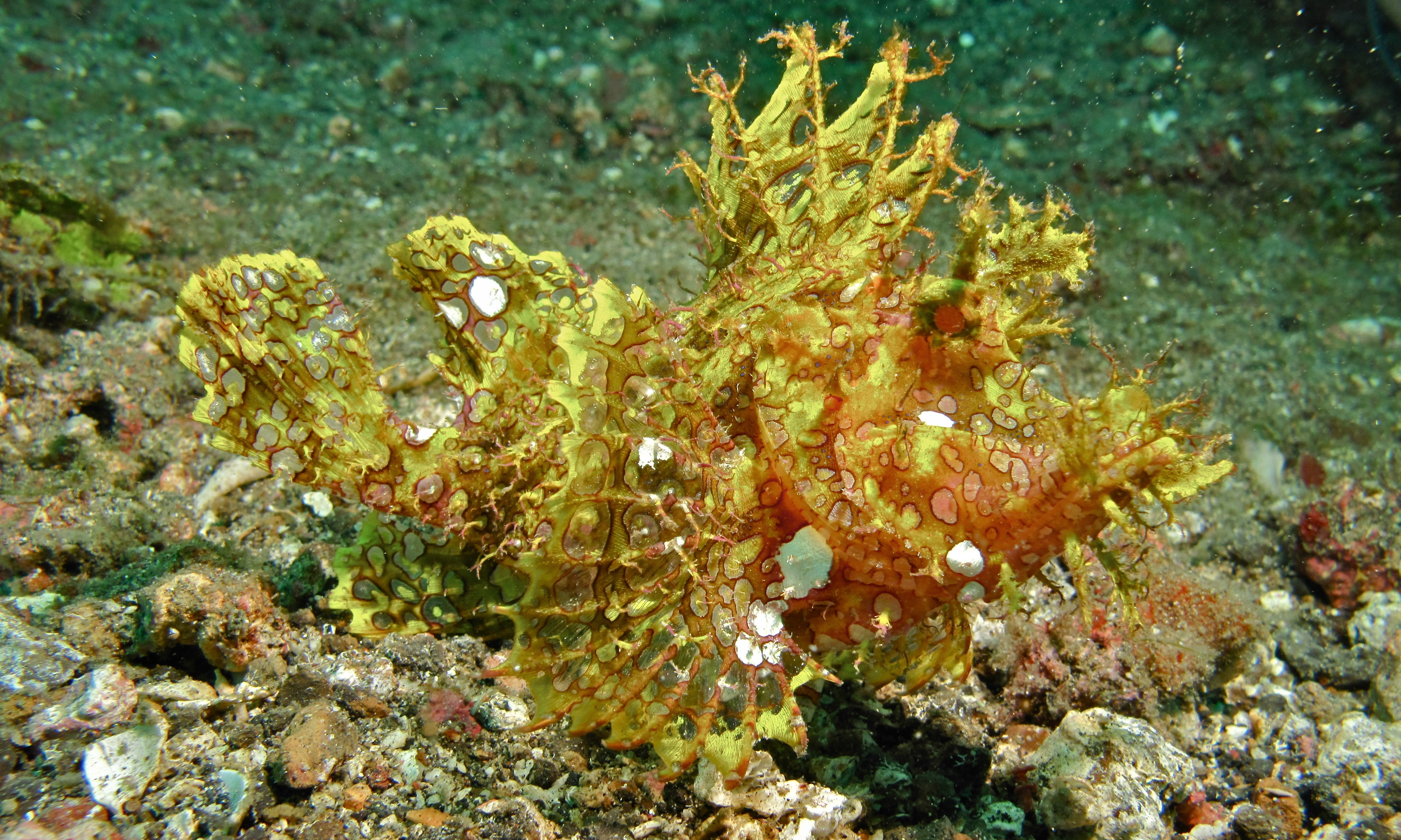
- Weedy scorpionfish Rhinopias frondosa

Scientific classification
- Kingdom: Animalia
- Phylum: Chordata
- Class: Actinopterygii
- Order: Perciformes
- Family: Scorpaenidae
- Subfamily: Scorpaeninae; Risso, 1827

Tribes and genera
- see text

= Scorpaeninae =

Scorpaeninae Temporal range: Middle Eocene–present

Subfamily of fishes

Scorpaeninae is a subfamily of ray-finned fish belonging to the family Scorpaenidae in the order Perciformes, it includes the scorpionfishes. They bear venomous spines in the anal, dorsal and pelvic fins which can cause severe pain in envenomated humans. The subfamily is distributed in the tropical and temperate seas around the world.

== Genera ==
The following genera are placed in this subfamily:

- Subfamily Scorpaeninae Risso, 1826
  - Hipposcorpaena Fowler, 1938
  - Hoplosebastes Schmidt, 1929
  - Idiastion Eschmeyer, 1965
  - Iracundus Jordan & Evermann, 1903
  - Neomerinthe Fowler, 1935
  - Neoscorpaena Mandrytsa, 2001
  - Parascorpaena Bleeker, 1876
  - Phenacoscorpius Fowler, 1938
  - Pogonoscorpius Regan, 1908
  - Pontinus Poey 1860
  - Pteroidichthys Bleeker, 1856
  - Rhinopias Gill, 1905
  - Scorpaena Linnaeus, 1758
  - Scorpaenodes Bleeker, 1857
  - Scorpaenopsis Heckel 1837
  - Sebastapistes Gill, 1877
  - Taenianotus Lacépède, 1802
  - Thysanichthys Jordan & Starks, 1904
  - Ursinoscorpaenopsis Nakabo & Yamada, 1996

Fossil otoliths of scorpaenines date back to the middle Eocene.
