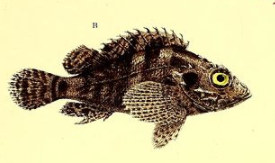
- Guam scorpionfish (Scorpaenodes guamensis)
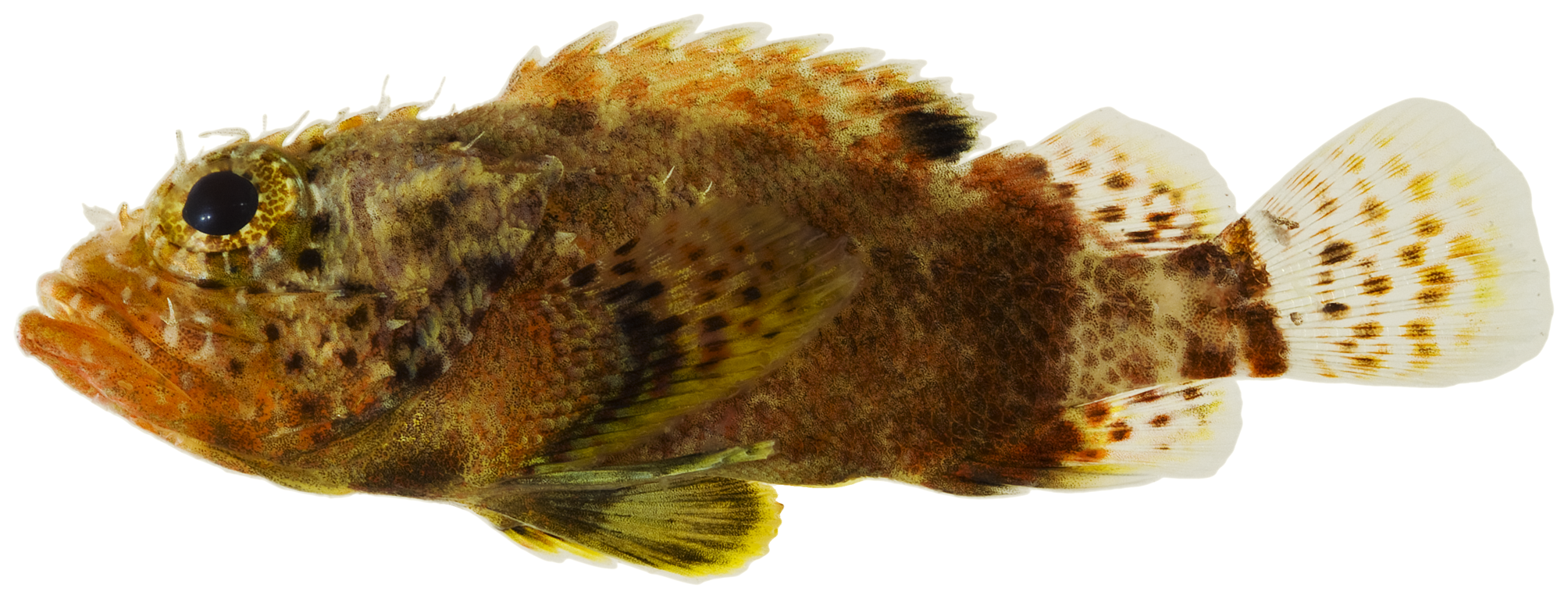
- Scorpaenodes caribbaeus

Scientific classification
- Kingdom: Animalia
- Phylum: Chordata
- Class: Actinopterygii
- Order: Perciformes
- Family: Scorpaenidae
- Subfamily: Scorpaeninae
- Genus: Scorpaenodes; Bleeker, 1857

Type species
- Scorpaena polylepis Bleeker, 1851

Synonyms
- Hypomacrus Evermann & Seale, 1907; Metzelaaria Jordan, 1923; Parascorpaenodes J. L. B. Smith, 1957; Paronescodes J. L. B. Smith, 1958; Sebastella Tanaka, 1917; Sebastopsis Gill, 1862; Sebastopsis Sauvage, 1873

= Scorpaenodes =

Genus of fishes

Scorpaenodes is a widespread genus of marine ray-finned fish belonging to the family Scorpaenidae, the scorpionfishes. The fishes in this genus are found to the Atlantic, Indian and Pacific Ocean.

== Taxonomy ==
Scorpaenodes was first formally described as a genus in 1857 by the Dutch physician, herpetologist and ichthyologist Pieter Bleeker, Bleeker designated Scorpaena polylepsis as its type species by monotypy. He had originally described this species from Western Sumatra in 1851. S. polylepsis was later shown to be junior synonym of Scorpaena guamensis which had been described from Guam by Jean René Constant Quoy and Joseph Paul Gaimard in 1824 from Guam. This genus is classified within the tribe Scorpaenini, in the subfamily Scorpaeninae of the family Scorpaenidae. The genus name Scorpaenodes means having the form of Scorpaena the genus Bleeker originally placed the type species in.

== Species ==
There are currently 29 recognized species in this genus:

- Scorpaenodes africanus Pfaff, 1933
- Scorpaenodes albaiensis (Evermann & Seale, 1907) (Long-fingered scorpionfish)
- Scorpaenodes arenai Torchio, 1962 (Messina scorpionfish)
- Scorpaenodes barrybrowni Pitassy & C. C. Baldwin, 2016 (Stellate scorpionfish)
- Scorpaenodes bathycolus G. R. Allen & Erdmann, 2012
- Scorpaenodes caribbaeus Meek & Hildebrand, 1928 (Reef scorpionfish)
- Scorpaenodes corallinus J. L. B. Smith, 1957
- Scorpaenodes elongatus Cadenat, 1950 (African spotted scorpionfish)
- Scorpaenodes englerti Eschmeyer & G. R. Allen, 1971 (Englert's scorpionfish)
- Scorpaenodes evides (D. S. Jordan & W. F. Thompson, 1914) (Cheek-spot scorpionfish)
- Scorpaenodes guamensis (Quoy & Gaimard, 1824) (Guam scorpionfish)
- Scorpaenodes hirsutus (J. L. B. Smith, 1957) (Hairy scorpionfish)
- Scorpaenodes immaculatus Poss & Collette, 1990
- Scorpaenodes insularis Eschmeyer, 1971
- Scorpaenodes investigatoris [Eschmeyer & Rama Rao, 1972
- Scorpaenodes kelloggi (O. P. Jenkins, 1903) (Kellogg's scorpionfish)
- Scorpaenodes minor (J. L. B. Smith, 1958) (Minor scorpionfish)
- Scorpaenodes muciparus (Alcock, 1889)
- Scorpaenodes parvipinnis (A. Garrett, 1864) (Low-fin scorpionfish)
- Scorpaenodes quadrispinosus D. W. Greenfield & Matsuura, 2002 (Four-spine scorpionfish)
- Scorpaenodes rubrivinctus Poss, McCosker & C. C. Baldwin, 2010
- Scorpaenodes scaber (E. P. Ramsay & J. D. Ogilby, 1886) (Pygmy scorpionfish)
- Scorpaenodes smithi Eschmeyer & Rama Rao, 1972 (Little scorpionfish)
- Scorpaenodes steenei G. R. Allen, 1977 (Steene's scorpionfish)
- Scorpaenodes steinitzi Klausewitz & Frøiland, 1970
- Scorpaenodes tredecimspinosus (Metzelaar, 1919) (Deep-reef scorpionfish)
- Scorpaenodes tribulosus Eschmeyer, 1969
- Scorpaenodes varipinnis J. L. B. Smith, 1957 (Blotch-fin scorpionfish)
- Scorpaenodes xyris (D. S. Jordan & C. H. Gilbert, 1882) (Rainbow scorpionfish)

== Characteristics ==
Scorpaenodes scorpionfishes have a very bony head which is defended by numerous spines and lacks an occipital pit. There is a longitudinal suborbital ridge which has 1-4 spines and may have another row of spines underneath those. There are teeth on the centre of the roof of the mouth but not on its sides. The dorsal fin has 13 spines and between 8 and 10 soft rays while the anal fin has 3 spines and 4 or 5 soft rays, the posteriormost dorsal and anal soft rays are branched. There are 15-20 fin rays in the pectoral fin with the lower rays being branched and the central rays being the longest. The scales are rough and typically extend onto the head. There are small spiny rays at top and bottom of the base of caudal fin. The largest species is S. africanus which has a maximum published total length of 90 cm (35 in), however most species are less than 15 cm (5.9 in) in length.

== Distribution and habitat ==
Scorpaenodes scorpionfishes have a circum-tropical distribution and are found in the Atlantic, Indian and Pacific Oceans. They are found in coastal waters on coral and rocky reefs and other hard substrates.
