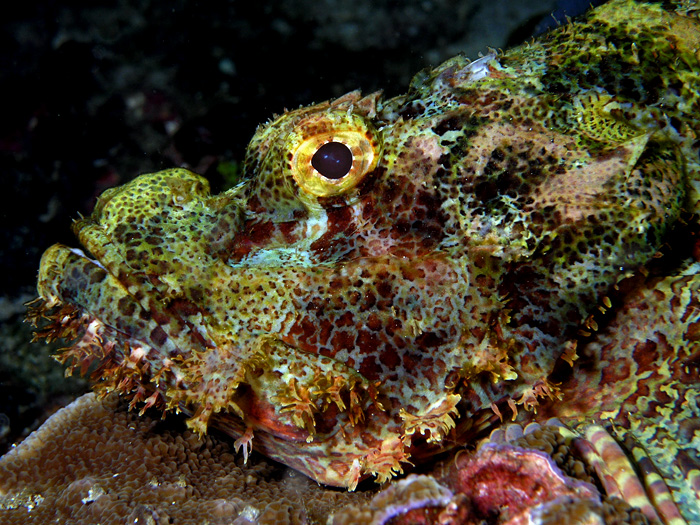
- Scorpaenopsis oxycephala

Scientific classification
- Kingdom: Animalia
- Phylum: Chordata
- Class: Actinopterygii
- Order: Perciformes
- Suborder: Scorpaenoidei
- Family: Scorpaenidae; A. Risso, 1826

Type species
- Scorpaena porcus Linnaeus, 1758

Subfamilies
- See text

= Scorpaenidae =

Scorpionfish Temporal range: Middle Eocene–present

Family of fishes

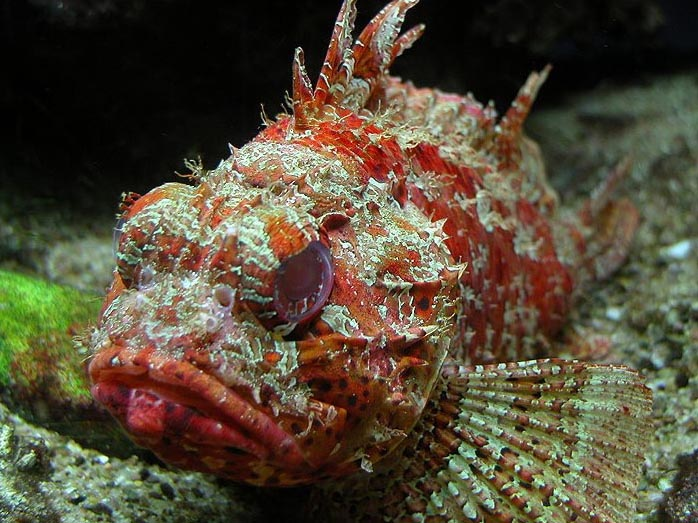
Scorpaena scrofa

The Scorpaenidae (also known as scorpionfish) are a family of mostly marine fishes that includes many of the world's most venomous species. As their name suggests, scorpionfish have a type of "sting" in the form of sharp spines coated with venomous mucus. They are widespread in tropical and temperate seas, especially in the Indo-Pacific region. They should not be confused with the cabezones, of the genus Scorpaenichthys, which belong to a separate, though related, family, Cottidae.

== Taxonomy ==
Scorpaenidae was described as a family in 1826 by the French naturalist Antoine Risso. The family was included in the suborder Scorpaenoidei of the order Scorpaeniformes in the fifth edition of Fishes of the World. However, more recent authorities place it in the suborder Scorpaenoidei of the order Perciformes. Following a major revision in 2018, several groups previously treated as subfamilies of Scorpaenidae, such as Synanceiidae and Plectrogeniidae, are now treated as their own families, while several tribes placed within Scorpaenidae, such as Pteroinae, are now treated as their own subfamilies.

== Subfamilies and genera ==
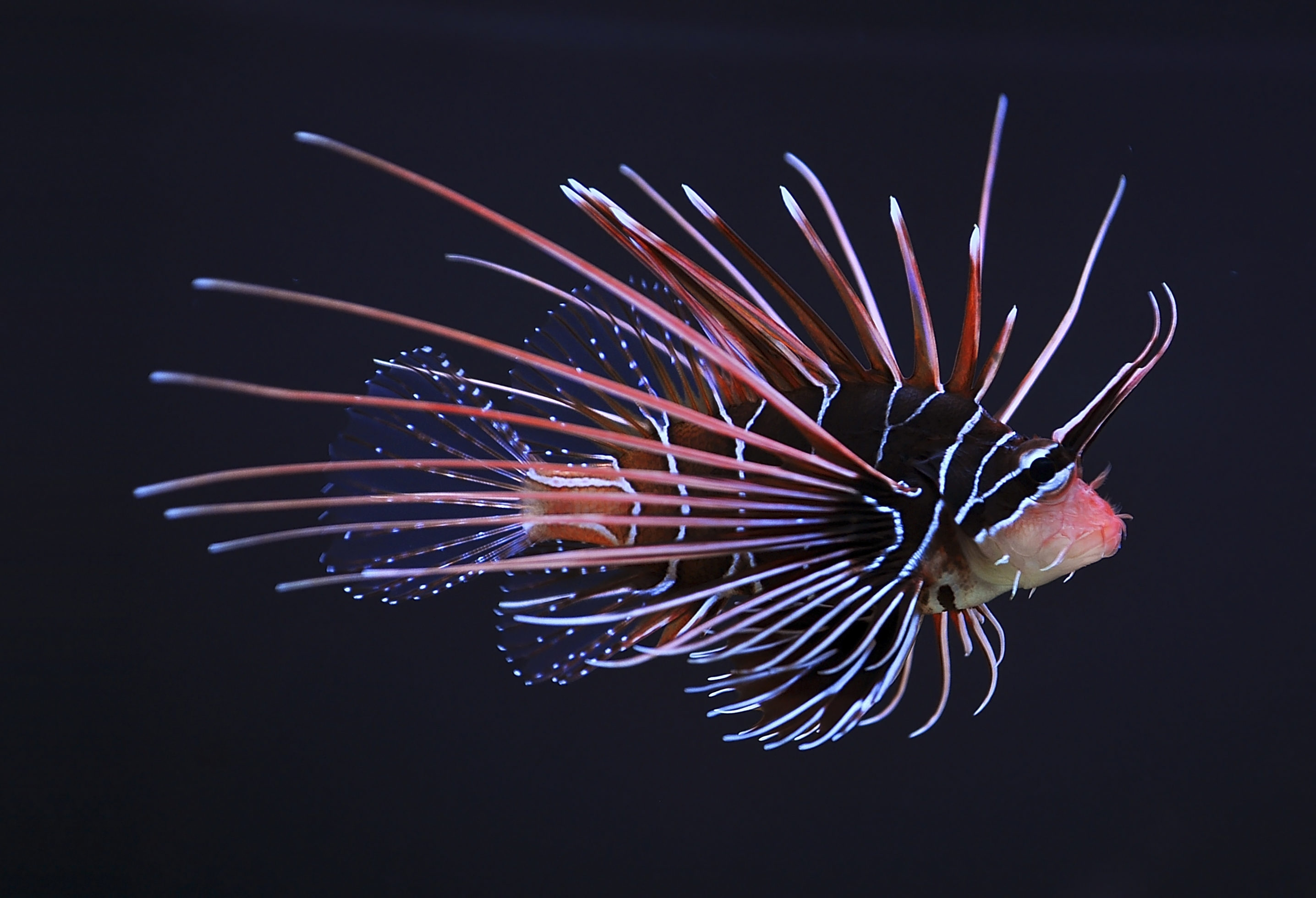
Pterois radiata

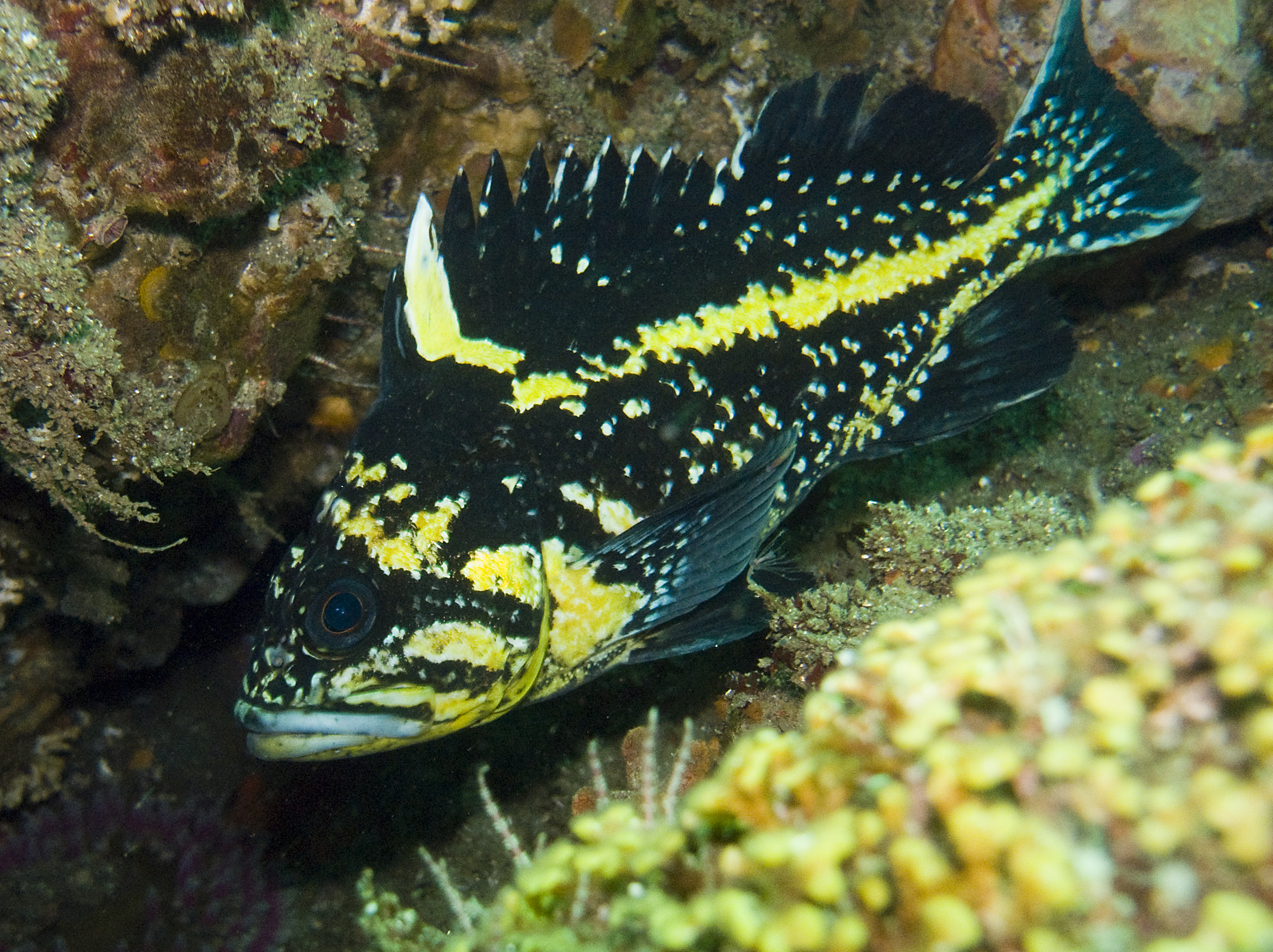
Sebastes nebulosus

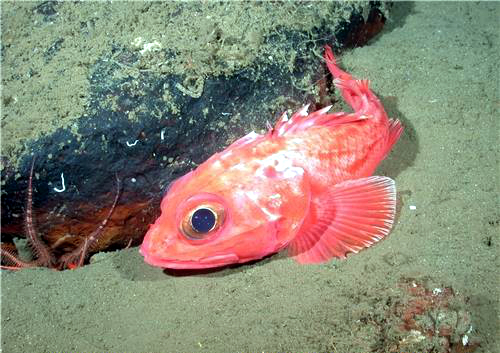
Sebastolobus alascanus

The Scorpaenidae are divided into these subfamilies and genera, containing a total of 39 genera with no fewer than 388 species:

- Subfamily Scorpaeninae Risso, 1826 (scorpionfishes and lionfishes)
  - Genus Hipposcorpaena Fowler, 1938
  - Genus Hoplosebastes Schmidt, 1929
  - Genus Idiastion Eschmeyer, 1965
  - Genus Iracundus Jordan & Evermann, 1903
  - Genus Neomerinthe Fowler, 1935
  - Genus Neoscorpaena Mandrytsa, 2001
  - Genus Parascorpaena Bleeker, 1876
  - Genus Phenacoscorpius Fowler, 1938
  - Genus Pogonoscorpius Regan, 1908
  - Genus Pontinus Poey 1860
  - Genus Pteroidichthys Bleeker, 1856
  - Genus Rhinopias Gill, 1905
  - Genus Scorpaena Linnaeus, 1758
  - Genus Scorpaenodes Bleeker, 1857
  - Genus Scorpaenopsis Heckel 1837
  - Genus Sebastapistes Gill, 1877
  - Genus Taenianotus Lacépède, 1802
  - Genus Thysanichthys Jordan & Starks, 1904
  - Genus Ursinoscorpaenopsis Nakabo & Yamada, 1996
- Subfamily Caracanthinae Gill, 1885 (orbicular velvetfishes or coral crouchers)
  - Genus Caracanthus Krøyer, 1845
- Subfamily Pteroinae Kaup, 1873 (turkeyfishes and lionfishes)
  - Genus Brachypterois Fowler, 1938
  - Genus Dendrochirus Swainson, 1839
  - Genus Ebosia Jordan & Starks, 1904
  - Genus Nemapterois Fowler 1938
  - Genus Neochirus Chou, Liu & Liao, 2023
  - Genus Parapterois Bleeker, 1876
  - Genus Pterois Oken, 1817
  - Genus Pteropterus Swainson, 1839
- Subfamily Setarchinae Matsubara, 1943 (deep-sea bristly scorpionfishes)
  - Genus Ectreposebastes Garman, 1899
  - Genus Lioscorpius Günther, 1880:
  - Genus Lythrichthys Jordan & Starks, 1904
  - Genus Setarches Johnson, 1862
- Subfamily Sebastolobinae Matsubara, 1943 (thornyheads)
  - Genus Adelosebastes Eschmeyer, T. Abe & Nakano, 1979
  - Genus Sebastolobus Gill, 1881
  - Genus Trachyscorpia Ginsburg, 1953
- Subfamily Sebastinae Kaup, 1873 (rockfishes)
  - Genus Helicolenus Goode & Bean, 1896
  - Genus Hozukius Matsubara, 1934
  - Genus Sebastes Cuvier, 1829
  - Genus Sebastiscus Jordan & Starks, 1904

Fossil otoliths of scorpaenids are known as early as the mid-Eocene, although body fossils only appear during the Oligocene or Miocene.

== Characteristics ==
The Scorpaenidae have a compressed body with the head typically having ridges and spines. One or two spines are on the operculum, with two normally being divergent, and three to five on the preoperculum, normally five. The suborbital stay is normally securely attached to the preoperculum, although in some species it may not be attached. If scales are present, they are typically ctenoid. They normally have a single dorsal fin, which is frequently incised. The dorsal fin contains between 11 and 17 spines and 8 and 17 soft rays, while the anal fin usually has between one and three spines, normally three, and three to nine soft rays, typically five, A single spine is in the pelvic fin with between two and five soft rays, again typically five, while the large pectoral fin contains 11–25 soft rays and sometimes has a few of the lower rays free of its membrane. The gill membranes are not attached to the isthmus. Some species have no swim bladder. Venom glands are in the spines of the dorsal, anal, and pelvic fins in some species. Most species use internal fertilisation, and some species are ovoviviparous while others lay their eggs in a gelatinous mass, with Scorpaena guttata being reported to create a gelatinous "egg balloon" as large as 20 cm (7.9 in) across. The largest species is the shortraker rockfish (Sebastes borealis), which attains a maximum total length of 108 cm (43 in), while many species have maximum total lengths of 5 cm (2.0 in).

== Distribution and habitat ==
Scorpaenidae species are mainly found in the Pacific and Indian Oceans, but some species are also found in the Atlantic Ocean. Some species, such as the lionfishes in the genus Pterois, are invasive non-native species in areas such as the Caribbean and the eastern Mediterranean Sea. They are found in marine and brackish-water habitats. They typically inhabit reefs, but can also be found in estuaries, bays and lagoons.
