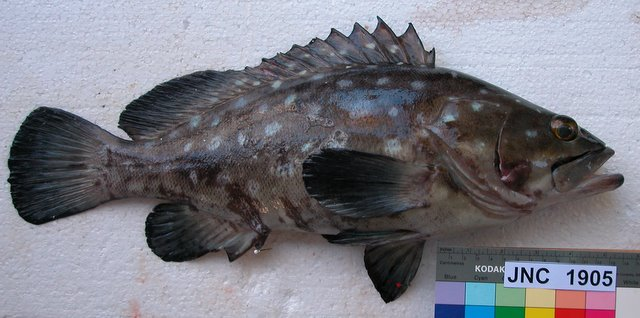

Conservation status
- Least Concern (IUCN 3.1)

Scientific classification
- Kingdom: Animalia
- Phylum: Chordata
- Class: Actinopterygii
- Division: Teleostei
- Order: Perciformes
- Suborder: Percoidei
- Family: Epinephelidae
- Genus: Epinephelus
- Species: E. coeruleopunctatus

Binomial name
- Epinephelus coeruleopunctatus (Bloch, 1790)

Synonyms
- Holocentrus coeruleopunctatus Bloch, 1790; Serranus alboguttatus Valenciennes, 1828; Serranus dermochirus Valenciennes, 1830; Serranus hoevenii Bleeker, 1849; Epinephelus hoevenii (Bleeker, 1849); Serranus kunhardtii Bleeker, 1851; Serranus flavoguttatus Peters, 1855

= Whitespotted grouper =

Species of fish

The whitespotted grouper (Epinephelus coeruleopunctatus), also known as the rankin cod, ocellated rockcod, small-spotted cod, white-spotted reef-cod or whitespotted rockcod, is a species of marine ray-finned fish, a grouper from the subfamily Epinephelinae which is part of the family Serranidae, which also includes the anthias and sea basses. It has an Indo-Pacific distribution . It is closely related to two other species of white spotted groupers in the genus Epinephelus.

== Description ==
The whitespotted grouper is a moderately deep-bodied fish growing to a maximum length of about 76 cm (30 in). There are three to five rows of teeth in the lower jaw. The dorsal fin has eleven spines and about sixteen soft rays and the anal fin has three spines and eight soft rays. The pelvic fins are short and the caudal fin is rounded. The top edge of the opercular cover is only slightly convex and the posterior edge curves at an acute angle. The head, body and dorsal fin are dark brownish-grey, spotted with large white blotches. In large adults, over about 30 cm (12 in), the white patches tend to merge into wavy bands or mottling.

== Distribution ==
The whitespotted grouper is found in shallow water in the Indo-Pacific region. Its range extends from the coast of East Africa and the Persian Gulf eastwards to Japan, China, Indonesia, Australia, Fiji and Tonga.

== Ecology ==
The whitespotted grouper is a demersal, shallow-water, reef-associated fish. It is generally found in rocky areas, or near where coral is growing in deep lagoons, or on outer reef slopes or channels, often near or in caves. It is not a schooling fish and is usually seen singly. It feeds on small fish and crustaceans, with crustaceans making up the greatest part of its diet. Little is known about its reproduction and life history.

== Status ==
The whitespotted grouper has a wide range and is common in places and uncommon in others. The population trend for this fish is unknown but it is caught in artisan fisheries throughout its range. The fish is found in a number of protected areas and the International Union for Conservation of Nature has assessed its conservation status as being of "least concern".

== Parasites ==
As all fish, the whitespotted grouper has many parasite species. The diplectanid monogenean Pseudorhabdosynochus bacchus is a parasite of the gills. Other parasites include copepods and species of Haliotrema (Monogenea) on the gills and the opecoelid digenean Cainocreadium epinepheli in the caeca.

== Taxonomy ==
The whitespotted grouper was first formally described as Holocentrus coeruleopunctatus in 1790 by the German naturalist Marcus Elieser Bloch (1723–1799) with the type locality not given but thought to be Indonesia. This species is closely related to other species of grouper marked with white spots Epinephelus ongus, Epinephelus summana, and Epinephelus corallicola.
