= Banded grouper =

Banded grouper is a common name for several fishes and may refer to:

- Epinephelus amblycephalus
- Epinephelus awoara
