= Goliath grouper =

Goliath grouper can refer to:

- Atlantic goliath grouper (Epinephelus itajara), Atlantic Ocean, including the Caribbean
- Pacific goliath grouper (Epinephelus quinquefasciatus), East Pacific

== See also ==
- Giant grouper (Epinephelus lanceolatus), Indo-Pacific
