= Coral grouper (disambiguation) =

Coral grouper refers to several species of fish in the grouper family Epinephelidae:

- Cephalopholis miniata
- Epinephelus corallicola
- Species of the genus Plectropomus
