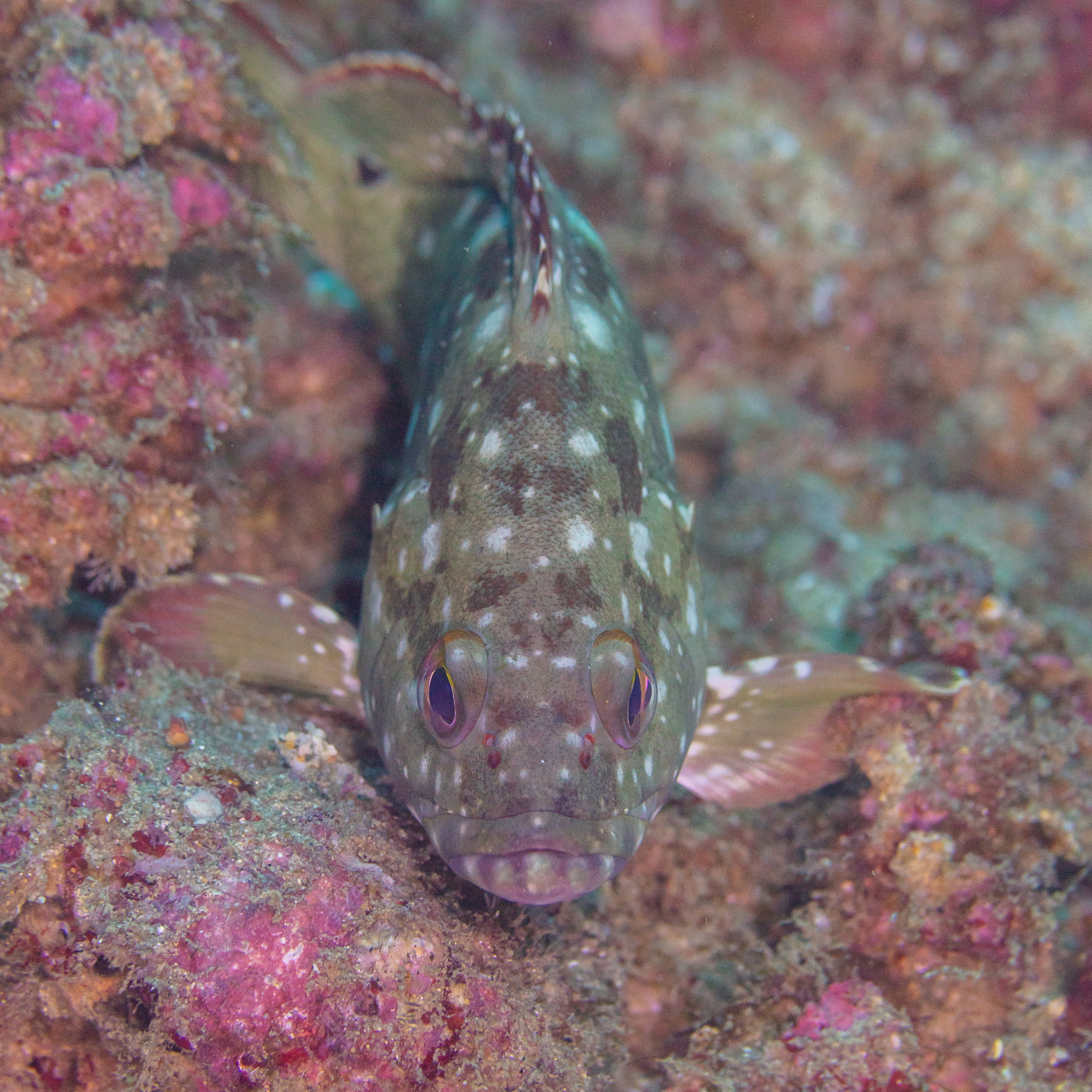
- Starry grouper at the Galápagos Islands

Conservation status
- Least Concern (IUCN 3.1)

Scientific classification
- Kingdom: Animalia
- Phylum: Chordata
- Class: Actinopterygii
- Division: Teleostei
- Order: Perciformes
- Family: Epinephelidae
- Genus: Epinephelus
- Species: E. labriformis

Binomial name
- Epinephelus labriformis (Jenyns, 1840)

Synonyms
- Serranus labriformis Jenyns, 1840; Epinephelus sellicauda Gill, 1862; Epinephelus ordinatus Cope, 1871

= Epinephelus labriformis =

Species of fish

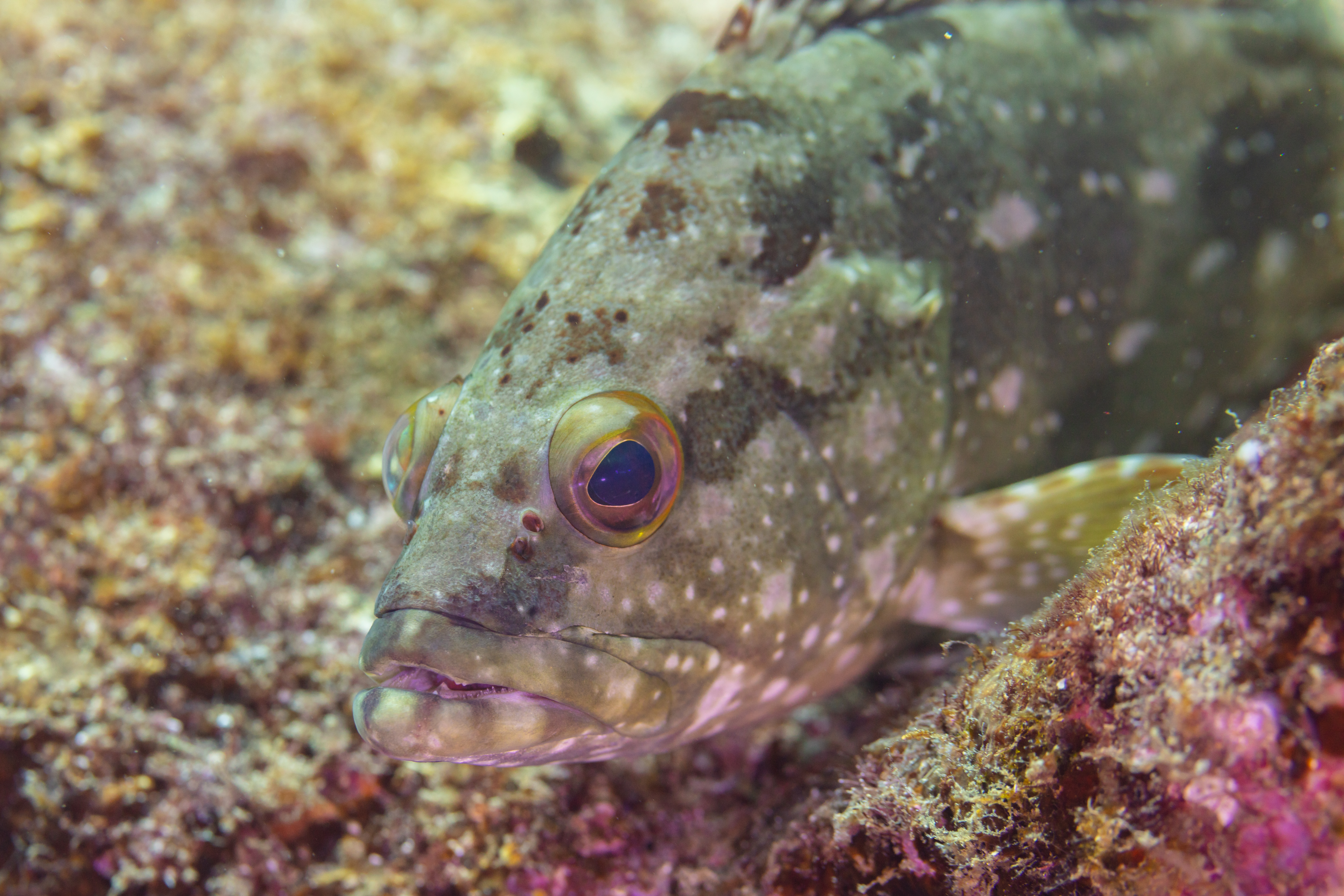
Close-up

Epinephelus labriformis, commonly called starry grouper or flag cabrilla is a species of marine ray-finned fish, a grouper from the subfamily Epinephelinae which is part of the family Serranidae, which also includes the anthias and sea basses. It is found in the eastern Pacific Ocean.

== Description ==
Epinephelus labriformis has a robust and compressed body which has a standard length that is 2.7 to 3.1 times its depth. The intraorbital region is flat. The finely serrated preopercle is rounded with the serrations on the lower edge being slightly enlarged. The upper edge of the gill cover is slightly convex. There are 11 spines in the dorsal fin and 16–18 soft rays while the anal fin contains 3 spines and 8 soft rays. The caudal fin is rounded. This species has an olive green head and body with a scattering of irregular white spots and blotches. The head and anterior part of the body have red-brown blotches and there is a black saddle mark on upper part of caudal peduncle. The outer margins of the dorsal and anal fins, the upper and lower margins of the caudal fin and outer half of the pectoral fin are red. This species attains a maximum total length of 60 centimetres (24 in).

== Distribution and habitat ==
Epinephelus labriformis is widespread throughout the tropical waters of the eastern Pacific Ocean from Mexico to Peru including offshore islands Galápagos, Cocos Island, Malpelo and Revillagigedo.

== Habitat and biology ==
Epinephelus labriformis adults are most abundant in shallow water but also occur to a depth of 30 m (98 ft). They inhabit rocky and coral reefs of coastal waters within the continental shelf. The starry grouper is a solitary predator that seems to feed on smaller fishes by day and crustaceans after dark. Spawning occurs in late summer.

== Taxonomy ==
Epinephelus labriformis was first formally described as Serranus labriformis in 1840 by the English clergyman, author and naturalist Leonard Jenyns (1800–1893) with the type locality given as Chatham Island in the Galápagos Islands.

== Utilisation ==
Epinephelus labriformis is one of the preferred target species for artisanal fisheries throughout the Gulf of California and along the Pacific coast of Mexico where it is captured throughout the years using hand lines, spearguns and gill nets. Its importance in these fisheries has increased as the populations of larger bodied groupers have decreased through overfishing. It is also caught in the Galapagos.
