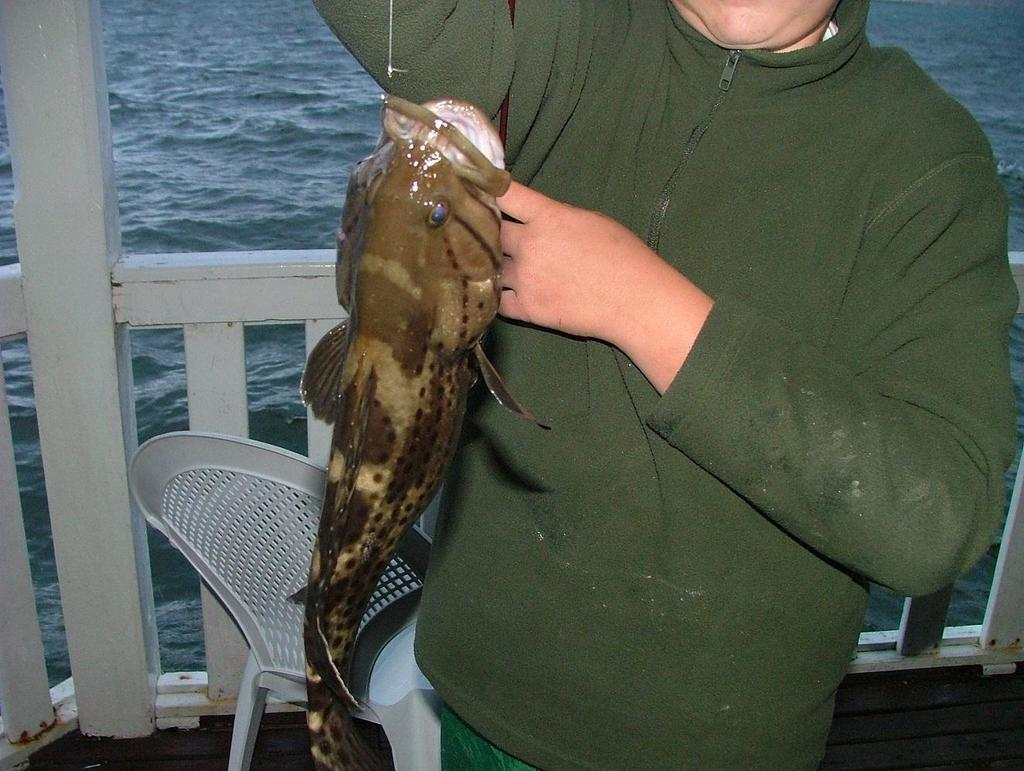

Conservation status
- Near Threatened (IUCN 3.1)

Scientific classification
- Kingdom: Animalia
- Phylum: Chordata
- Class: Actinopterygii
- Order: Perciformes
- Suborder: Percoidei
- Family: Epinephelidae
- Genus: Epinephelus
- Species: E. andersoni

Binomial name
- Epinephelus andersoni Boulenger, 1903

= Epinephelus andersoni =

Species of fish

Epinephelus andersoni, the catface grouper, brown-spotted grouper, catface rockcod or brown spotted rockcod, is a species of marine ray-finned fish, a grouper from the subfamily Epinephelinae which is part of the family Serranidae, which also includes the anthias and sea basses. It is found in the southwestern Indian Ocean where it is associated with reefs.

== Description ==
Epinephelus andersoni' has an elongate body with a relatively shallow body depth which fits into its standard length 3.2 to 3.7 times. The preopercle is angular and the serrations at its and are somewhat enlarged. The dorsal fin contains 11 spines and 13–15 soft rays while the anal fin has 3 spines and 8 soft rays. The caudal fin is clearly rounded. There are 66–74 scales in the lateral line. The background colour of the head, body, and fins is brown, the body, caudal fin and dorsal fins are densely marked with irregular, small, dark brown spots. There are 2 dark brown stripes one of which runs from the eye across the gill cover while the other runs from the from maxillary groove to the lower margin of the preopercle. The juveniles are marked with horizontal dark stripes which dissolve into spots as they approach the caudal peduncle. They also have a black blotch at base of rearmost spines in the dorsal fin and 2 small black spots at base of soft-rayed part of the dorsal fin with a third spot on the upper part of the caudal peduncle. Between each of these black blotches there are 4 or 5 white spots. The maximum recorded total length is 87 centimetres (34 in) and the maximum recorded weight is 9.4 kilograms (21 lb).

== Distribution ==
Epinephelus andersoni is endemic to the southwestern Indian Ocean where it occurs off the coast of southeastern Africa. Its distribution extends from Zavala, Mozambique to the Western Cape Province of South Africa. It has been recorded as far south as the De Hoop Marine Protected Area but it is rare south of Knysna.

== Habitat and biology ==
Epinephelus andersoni is rarely recorded from coral reefs and is more associated with shallow rocky reefs down to 70 metres (230 ft). This species is among the pioneer species of predatory fish when new habitats are created, such as shipwrecks or artificial reefs. The adults undertake short migrations or explorations which allows them to colonise reefs which have no existing large predatory fish. As they grow the juveniles move away from reefs in the surf zone towards reefs in deeper water. Once settled the adults are largely sedentary although juveniles may move as much as 400 kilometres (250 miles). Before sexual maturity the fish migrate northwards and spawning has not been recorded south of Durban. This species is a relatively slow-growing, diandric protogynous hermaphrodite, this means that some males are change sex from functional females, but others develop into males from non-reproductive juveniles, and the sex ratio is not as female-biased as in protogynous hermaphrodites where all fish sexually mature as females before some change into males, known as monandric. The testicular structure of individual males which change sex from female is different from that of the males which developed from juveniles. The breeding season runs from September to February off KwaZulu-Natal. This species is a predatory fish which feeds on other fishes, crustaceans and squid.

== Taxonomy ==
Epinephelus andersoni was first formally described in 1903 by the Belgian–British ichthyologist George Albert Boulenger (1858–1937) with the type locality being given as the Colony of Natal. The specific name honours Alexander Anderson of Durban, a fish dealer, who brought the type specimen to London for Boulenger to describe.

== Utilisation ==
Epinephelus andersoni is caught using handlines and fishing rods from small boats and the commercial fishery is managed by a total allowable effort limitation in South Africa. For recreational fishers there is a bag limit of 5 fish per person per day and a minimum length of 50 centimetres (20 in).
