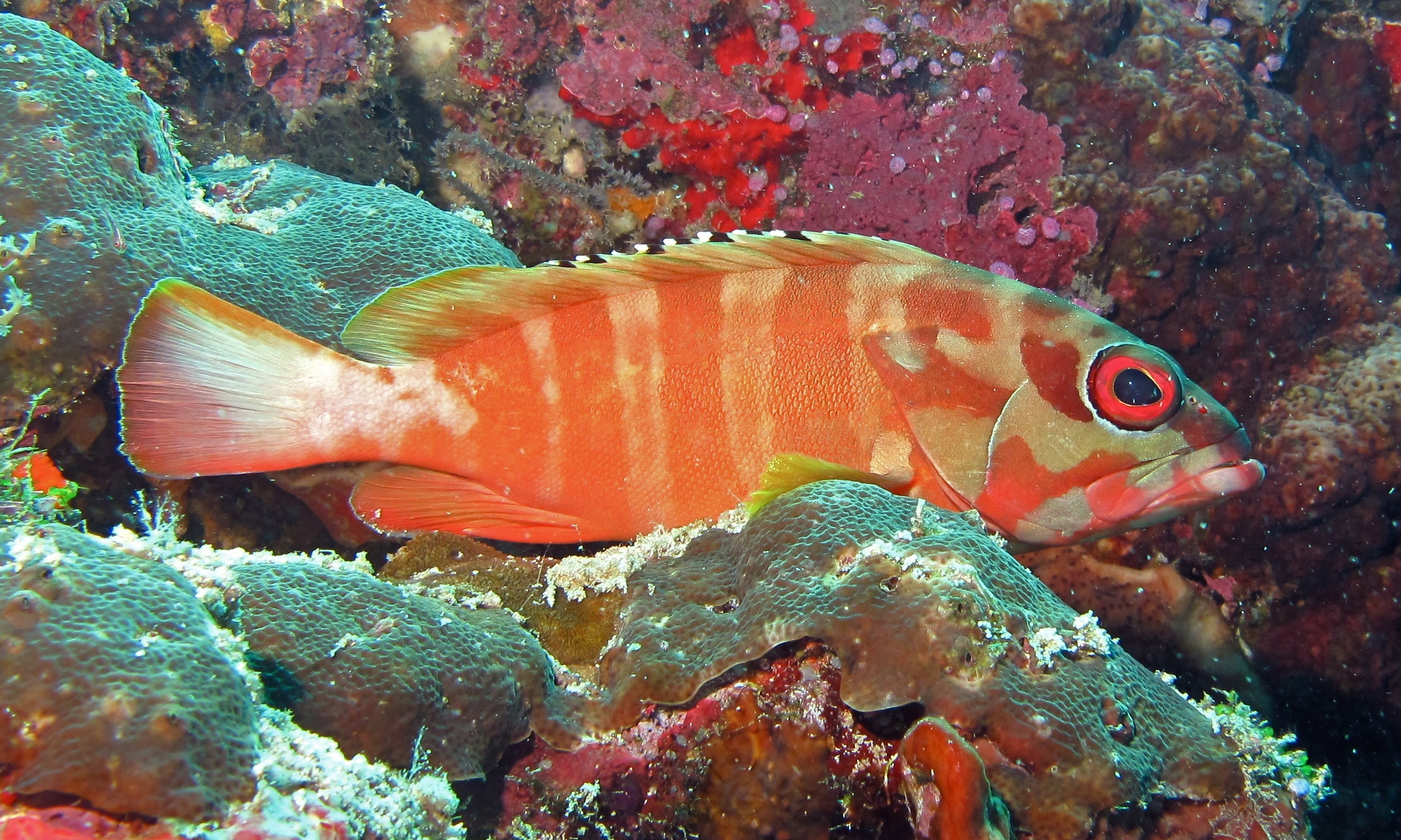
- Epinephelus fasciatus, the type species
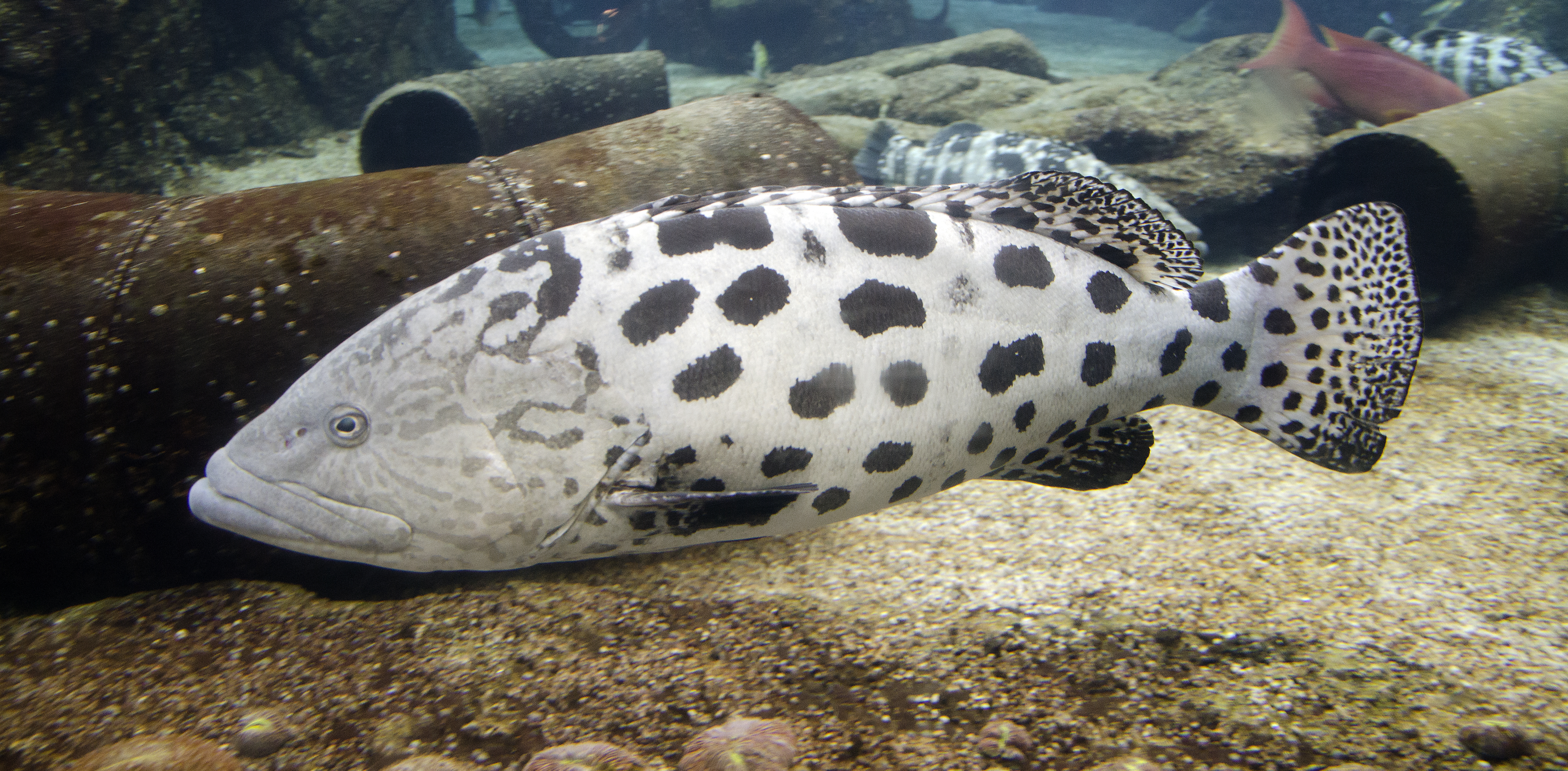
- Epinephelus tukula

Scientific classification
- Kingdom: Animalia
- Phylum: Chordata
- Class: Actinopterygii
- Division: Teleostei
- Order: Perciformes
- Family: Epinephelidae
- Genus: Epinephelus; Bloch, 1793

Type species
- Epinephelus marginalis Bloch, 1793

Species
- see text

Synonyms
- List: Altiserranus Whitley, 1947; Cerna Bonaparte, 1833; Cernua [Costa, 1849; Cynichthys Swainson, 1839; Enneistus D.S. Jordan & Evermann, 1896; Garrupa D.S. Jordan, 1890; Homalogrystes Alleyne & Macleay, 1877; Hyposerranus Klunzinger, 1884; Itaiara Vaillant & Bocourt, 1878; Labroperca Gill, 1862; Merou Bonaparte (ex Cuvier), 1831; Merus Poey (ex Cuvier), 1871; Phrynotitan Gill, 1885; Priacanthichthys Day, 1868; Promicrops Poey (ex Gill), 1868; Stereolepoides Fowler, 1923

= Epinephelus =

Epinephelus Temporal range: Late Miocene to recent

Genus of fishes

Epinephelus is a genus of groupers. They are predatory fish, largely associated with reefs, and are found in tropical and subtropical seas throughout the world. They are important target species for fisheries.

== Taxonomy ==
Beginning in 2001, genetic analyses started to show that the genus Epinephelus was paraphyletic, with several other grouper genera nested within it. Steps to rectify this paraphyly first occurred in 2007, when several Epinephelus species were moved to the resurrected genus Hyporthodus. In 2018, a study again addressed the paraphyly by moving a large number of Epinephelus species to Mycteroperca, and moved the monospecific genera Anyperodon and Cromileptes to Epinephelus. However, the changes recommended in 2018 have not yet been accepted by authorities such as Eschmeyer's Catalog of Fishes.

Species that are classified in the genus Epinephelus according to Ma & Craig 2018 are split into two clades.

== Characteristics ==
The fishes in the genus Epinephelus have elongated, subcylindrical bodies, which may be oblong or deep and compressed in shape. The depth of the body varies between 2.3 and 3.7 times the standard length and the head is usually around the same length as the body is deep. The preopercle can be rounded or angular and has a serrated rear edge with the serrations at the angle being enlarged to a lesser or greater extent. In a small number of species, serrations are small, and on the lower edge, they are covered by skin. Caniform teeth are found at the front of jaws, although these can be rather small in a few species. They do not have any obviously enlarged caniform teeth in the middle of the lower jaw. Teeth are on the roof of the mouth. In adults, the maxilla does not have a noticeable bony protrusion on the lower rear angle, although it can have a deep step or hook-like process, which is hidden by the upper lips, on the rear part of its lower edge. The dorsal fin normally contains 9 spines, although some species have 10, as well as 12 to 19 rays. The origin of the dorsal fin sits above the opercle and the soft rayed part is shorter than the spiny part. The anal fin contains three distinct spines and 7 to 10 soft rays. The pectoral fin is rounded, with its middle rays being longer than the others. The caudal fin may be rounded, truncated, or concave, contains eight branched rays and 8 to 10 fin rays, which are slender, unbranched, and unsegmented (referred to as "procurrent") fin rays at the leading edges of the caudal fin on the upper lobe and seven branched rays and 7 to 10 procurrent rays in the lower lobe. The body is covered in ctenoid or smooth scales.

== Habitat and biology ==
E. fuscoguttatus showing gills

Epinephelus groupers are occur mainly on coral or rocky reefs, although a small number of species have been recorded over substrates consisting of sand, silt, or mud. A few species are found in deep water, down to at least 525 m (1,722 ft), but the majority occur between 10 and 200 m (33 and 656 ft). The two largest members of the genus, E. itajara and E. lanceolatus, may attain a length in excess of 2 m (6.6 ft) and a weight greater than 400 kg (880 lb), and frequently have been recorded in estuaries and harbours. Most of the species in the genus Epinephelus are predatory fish that feed on larger invertebrates, mostly crustaceans, and other fishes taken on or close to the substrate. E. undulosus is an unusual grouper species distinguished by having many, long gill rakers, and this species has been reported to feed on pelagic tunicates, at least on occasion. Only a few species have had their reproductive biology studied, and many species appear to be protogynous hermaphrodites. In some species, though, males in the populations are smaller than some of the females, suggesting a more complex biology, which suggests that some females do not change sex, and that some males may not have a undergone a functional female stage.

== Distribution ==
Epinephelus species are found around the world in tropical and subtropical seas and oceans. The greatest diversity occurs in the Indo-West Pacific, while eight species are found in the eastern Pacific, 11 in the western Atlantic Ocean, and 9 species in the eastern Atlantic Ocean and the Mediterranean.

Four species have entered the Mediterranean Sea from the Red Sea via the Suez Canal as Lessepsian migrants.

== Utilisation ==
Epinephelus groupers are among the most valuable species exploited by commercial fishes in the world's tropical seas, and they fetch some of the highest prices when marketed. They have also been used in aquaculture.

== Species ==
The recognized species in this genus are the following, with clades named as per Ma & Craig 2018, and additional species placements from other studies.

Clade	Species	Common name	Image
Clade F	Epinephelus adscensionis (Osbeck, 1765)	rock hind	
Clade F	Epinephelus akaara (Temminck & Schlegel, 1843)	Hong Kong grouper	
Clade F	Epinephelus amblycephalus (Bleeker, 1857)	banded grouper	
Clade F	Epinephelus analogus T. N. Gill, 1863	spotted grouper	
Clade F	Epinephelus areolatus (Forsskål, 1775)	areolate grouper	
Clade F	Epinephelus awoara (Temminck & Schlegel, 1843)	yellow grouper	
Clade F	Epinephelus bilobatus J. E. Randall & G. R. Allen, 1987	twin-spot grouper	
Clade F	Epinephelus bleekeri (Vaillant, 1878)	dusky-tail grouper	
Clade F	Epinephelus bontoides (Bleeker, 1855)	pale-margin grouper	
Clade F	Epinephelus chlorostigma (Valenciennes, 1828)	brown-spotted grouper	
Clade F	Epinephelus clippertonensis G. R. Allen & D. R. Robertson, 1999	Clipperton grouper	
Clade F	Epinephelus cyanopodus (J. Richardson, 1846)	speckled blue grouper	
Clade F	Epinephelus diacanthus (Valenciennes, 1828)	spiny-cheek grouper	
Clade F	Epinephelus fasciatomaculosus (W. K. H. Peters, 1865)	rock grouper	
Clade F	Epinephelus fasciatus (Forsskål, 1775)	black-tip grouper	
Clade F	Epinephelus faveatus (Valenciennes, 1828)	barred-chest grouper	
Clade F	Epinephelus flavocaeruleus (Lacépède, 1802)	blue-and-yellow grouper	
Clade F	Epinephelus gabriellae J. E. Randall & Heemstra, 1991	multispotted grouper	
Clade F	Epinephelus geoffroyi (Klunzinger, 1870)	Red Sea spotted grouper	
Clade F	Epinephelus guttatus (Linnaeus, 1758)	red hind	
Clade F	Epinephelus hexagonatus (Bloch & J. G. Schneider, 1801)	star-spotted grouper	
Clade F	Epinephelus howlandi (Günther, 1873)	black-saddle grouper	
Clade F	Epinephelus insularis Nakamura & Motomura, 2021	insular grouper	
Clade F	Epinephelus irroratus (Forster, 1801)	Marquesan grouper	
Clade F	Epinephelus japonicus (Temminck & Schlegel, 1843)	Japanese grouper	
Clade F	Epinephelus labriformis (L. Jenyns, 1840)	starry grouper	
Clade F	Epinephelus longispinis (Kner, 1864)	long-spine grouper	
Clade F	Epinephelus macrospilos (Bleeker, 1855)	snub-nose grouper	
Clade F	Epinephelus maculatus (Bloch, 1790)	high-fin grouper	
Clade F	Epinephelus melanostigma Schultz, 1953	one-blotch grouper	
Clade F	Epinephelus merra Bloch, 1793	honeycomb grouper	
Clade F	Epinephelus miliaris (Valenciennes, 1830)	net-fin grouper	
Clade F	Epinephelus morio (Valenciennes, 1828)	red grouper	
Clade F	Epinephelus multinotatus (W. K. H. Peters, 1876)	white-blotched grouper	
Clade F	Epinephelus polylepis J. E. Randall & Heemstra, 1991	small-scaled grouper	
Clade F	Epinephelus quoyanus (Valenciennes, 1830)	long-fin grouper	
Clade F	Epinephelus rankini Whitley, 1945	Rankin's grouper	
Clade F	Epinephelus retouti Bleeker, 1868	red-tipped grouper	
Clade F	Epinephelus rivulatus (Valenciennes, 1830)	halfmoon grouper	
Clade F	Epinephelus sexfasciatus (Valenciennes, 1828)	six-bar grouper	
Clade F	Epinephelus spilotoceps Schultz, 1953	four-saddle grouper	
Clade F	Epinephelus stictus J. E. Randall & G. R. Allen, 1987	black-dotted grouper	
Clade F	Epinephelus striatus (Bloch, 1792)	Nassau grouper	
Clade F	Epinephelus tankahkeei Wu, Qu, Lin, Tang & Ding 2020		
Clade F	Epinephelus tauvina (Forsskål, 1775)	greasy grouper	
Clade F	Epinephelus trimaculatus (Valenciennes, 1828)	three-spot grouper	
Clade F	Epinephelus undulatostriatus (W. K. H. Peters, 1867)	Maori grouper	
Clade F	Epinephelus undulosus (Quoy & Gaimard, 1824)	wavy-lined grouper	
Clade E	Epinephelus aeneus (É. Geoffroy Saint-Hilaire, 1817)	white grouper	
Clade E	Epinephelus bruneus Bloch, 1793	long-tooth grouper	
Clade E	Epinephelus coeruleopunctatus (Bloch, 1790)	white-spotted grouper	
Clade E	Epinephelus coioides (F. Hamilton, 1822)	orange-spotted grouper	
Clade E	Epinephelus corallicola (Valenciennes, 1828)	coral grouper	
Clade E	Epinephelus daemelii (Günther, 1876)	saddle-tail grouper	
Clade E	Epinephelus erythrurus (Valenciennes, 1828)	cloudy grouper	
Clade E	Epinephelus fuscoguttatus (Forsskål, 1775)	brown-marbled grouper	
Clade E	Epinephelus itajara (Lichtenstein, 1822)	Atlantic goliath grouper	
Clade E	Epinephelus lanceolatus (Bloch, 1790)	giant grouper	
Clade E	Epinephelus latifasciatus (Temminck & Schlegel, 1843)	striped grouper	
Clade E	Epinephelus malabaricus (Bloch & J. G. Schneider, 1801)	Malabar grouper	
Clade E	Epinephelus ongus (Bloch, 1790)	white-streaked grouper	
Clade E	Epinephelus polyphekadion (Bleeker, 1849)	camouflage grouper	
Clade E	Epinephelus quinquefasciatus (Bocourt, 1868)	Pacific goliath grouper	
Clade E	Epinephelus summana (Forsskål, 1775)	Summan grouper	
Clade E	Epinephelus tukula Morgans, 1959	potato grouper	
Clade D*	Epinephelus albomarginatus Boulenger, 1903	white-edged grouper	
Clade D*	Epinephelus andersoni Boulenger, 1903	cat-face grouper	
Clade D*	Epinephelus caninus (Valenciennes, 1843)	dog-tooth grouper	
Clade D*	Epinephelus costae (Steindachner, 1878)	gold-blotch grouper	
Clade D*	Epinephelus epistictus (Temminck & Schlegel, 1843)	dotted grouper	
Clade D*	Epinephelus fuscomarginatus Johnson & Worthington Wilmer, 2019	darkmargin grouper	
Clade D*	Epinephelus goreensis (Valenciennes, 1830)	Dungat grouper	
Clade D*	Epinephelus heniochus Fowler, 1904	Bridled grouper	
Clade D*	Epinephelus magniscuttis Postel, Fourmanoir & Guézé, 1963	speckled grouper	
Clade D*	Epinephelus marginatus (R. T. Lowe, 1834)	dusky grouper	
Clade D*	Epinephelus morrhua (Valenciennes, 1833)	comet grouper	
Clade D*	Epinephelus poecilonotus (Temminck & Schlegel, 1843)	dot-dash grouper	
Clade D*	Epinephelus posteli Fourmanoir & Crosnier, 1964	striped-fin grouper	
Clade D*	Epinephelus radiatus (F. Day, 1868)	oblique-banded grouper	
Unknown	Epinephelus chlorocephalus (Valenciennes, 1830)	Tonga grouper	
Unknown	Epinephelus craigi Frable, Tucker & Walker, 2018	brokenbar grouper	
Unknown	Epinephelus indistinctus J. E. Randall & Heemstra, 1991	Somali grouper	
Unknown	Epinephelus kupangensis Tucker, Kurniasih & Craig, 2016	fivebar grouper	
Unknown	Epinephelus lebretonianus (Hombron & Jacquinot, 1853)	mystery grouper	
Unknown	Epinephelus polystigma (Bleeker, 1853)	white-dotted grouper	
Unknown	Epinephelus randalli Hoshino, Denou & Nguyen 2024	mud grouper	
Unknown	Epinephelus sicanus (Doderlein, 1882)	Sicilian grouper	
Unknown	Epinephelus socialis (Günther, 1873)	surge grouper	
Unknown	Epinephelus stoliczkae (F. Day, 1875)	epaulet grouper	
Unknown	Epinephelus suborbitalis Amaoka & J. E. Randall, 1990	seamount grouper	
Unknown	Epinephelus timorensis J. E. Randall & G. R. Allen, 1987	yellow-spotted grouper	
Unknown	Epinephelus trophis J. E. Randall & G. R. Allen, 1987	plump grouper	
Unknown	Epinephelus tuamotuensis Fourmanoir, 1971	reticulated grouper	

*Nota bene: Species in clade D are phylogenetically nested within Mycteroperca.

In addition, the fossil species †Epinephelus progigas Arambourg, 1928 is known from the latest Miocene (Messinian) of Algeria.
