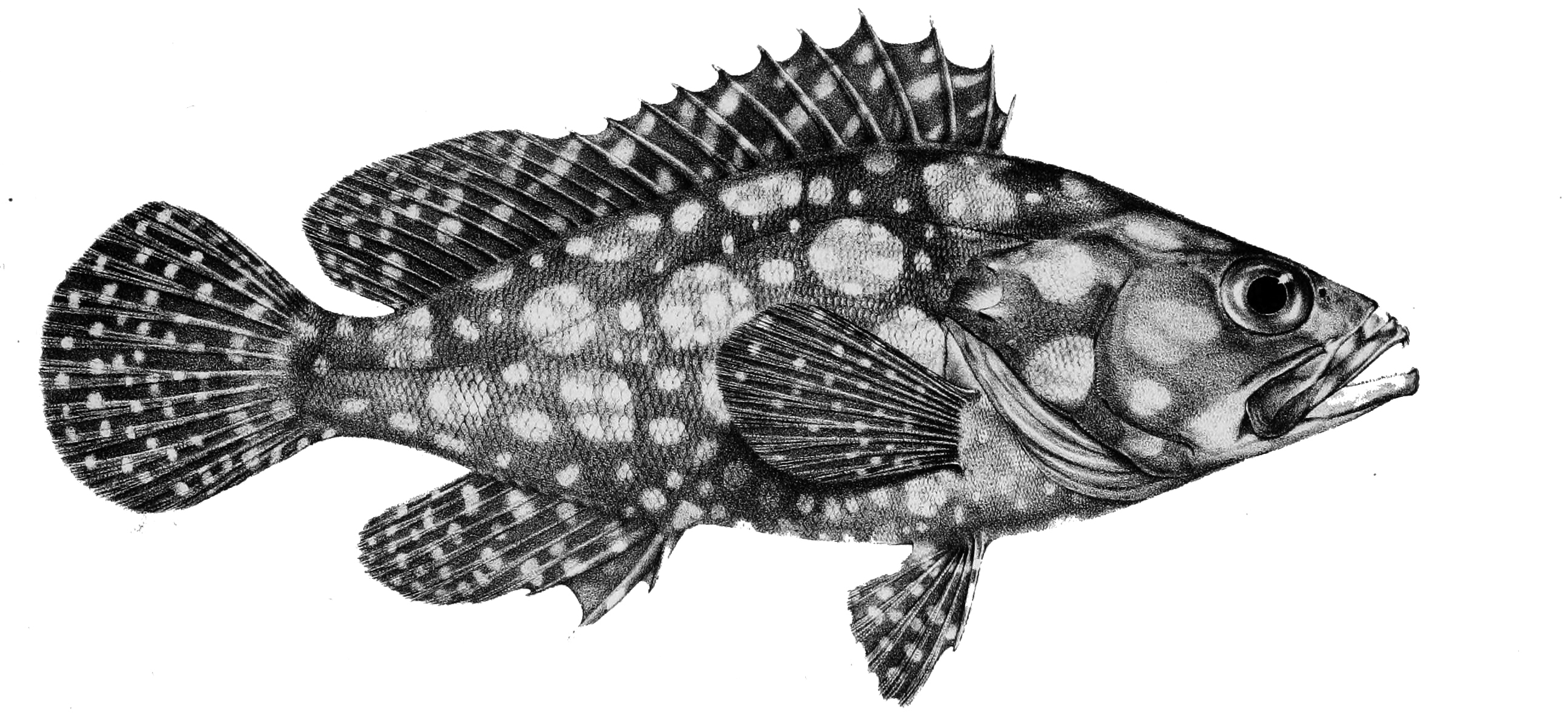

Conservation status
- Least Concern (IUCN 3.1)

Scientific classification
- Kingdom: Animalia
- Phylum: Chordata
- Class: Actinopterygii
- Division: Teleostei
- Order: Perciformes
- Family: Epinephelidae
- Genus: Epinephelus
- Species: E. ongus

Binomial name
- Epinephelus ongus (Bloch, 1790)

Synonyms
- Holocentrus ongus Bloch, 1790; Serranus reticulatus Valenciennes, 1828; Serranus tumilabris Valenciennes, 1828; Serranus dichropterus Valenciennes, 1828; Serranus bataviensis Bleeker, 1849; Epinephelus summana hostiaretis Whitley, 1954; Epinephelus slacksmithi Whitley, 1959

= Epinephelus ongus =

Species of fish

Epinephelus ongus, the white-streaked grouper, specklefin grouper, lace-finned rock-cod, specklefin rockcod, wavy-lined rock-cod, white-speckled grouper or white-spotted rock-cod, is a species of marine ray-finned fish, a grouper from the subfamily Epinephelinae which is part of the family Serranidae, which also includes the anthias and sea basses. It has a wide Indo-Pacific distribution and it is found in brackish waters as well as marine reefs.

== Description ==
Epinephelus ongus has a body which has a standard length that is 2.7 to 3.2 times as long as it is deep. The dorsal profile of the head is moderately convex, while the area between the eyes is flat. The preopercle is rounded and the serrations on its edge are largely clothed in skin. The upper edge of the gill cover is notably convex. The dorsal fin contains 11 spines and 14–16 soft rays, while the anal fin has 3 spines and 8 soft rays. The caudal fin varies from convex to slightly rounded. The overall colour of this species is brown marked with large white blotches and many smaller pale spots on its head, body and fins which elongate and form streaks in the larger fish. The median fins have a dark submarginal band. The juveniles are dark brown with a pattern of white spots covering their bodies and fins. The spots often form wavy lines and there is a faint dark maxillary streak. This species attains a maximum published total length of 40 centimetres (16 in).

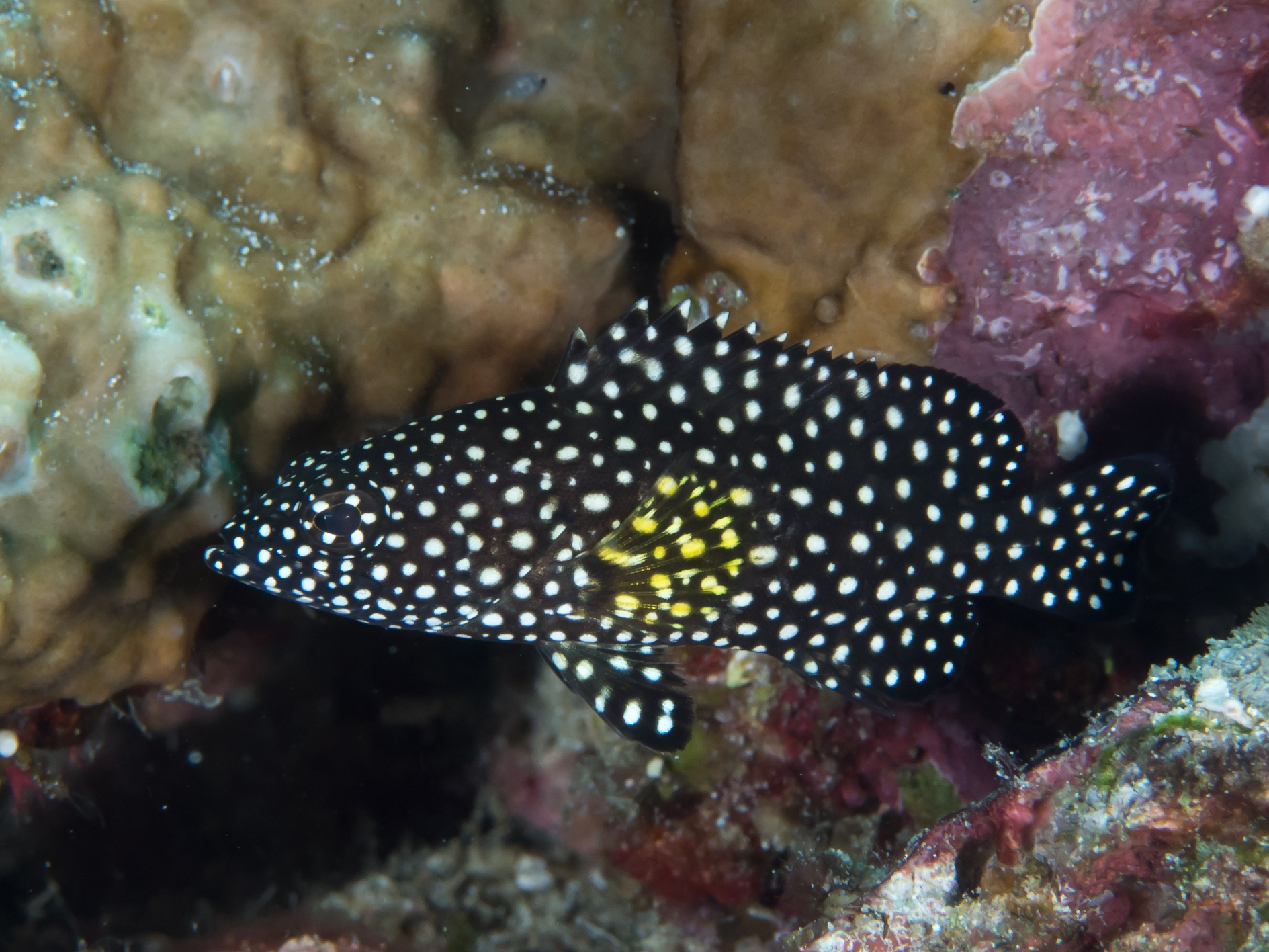

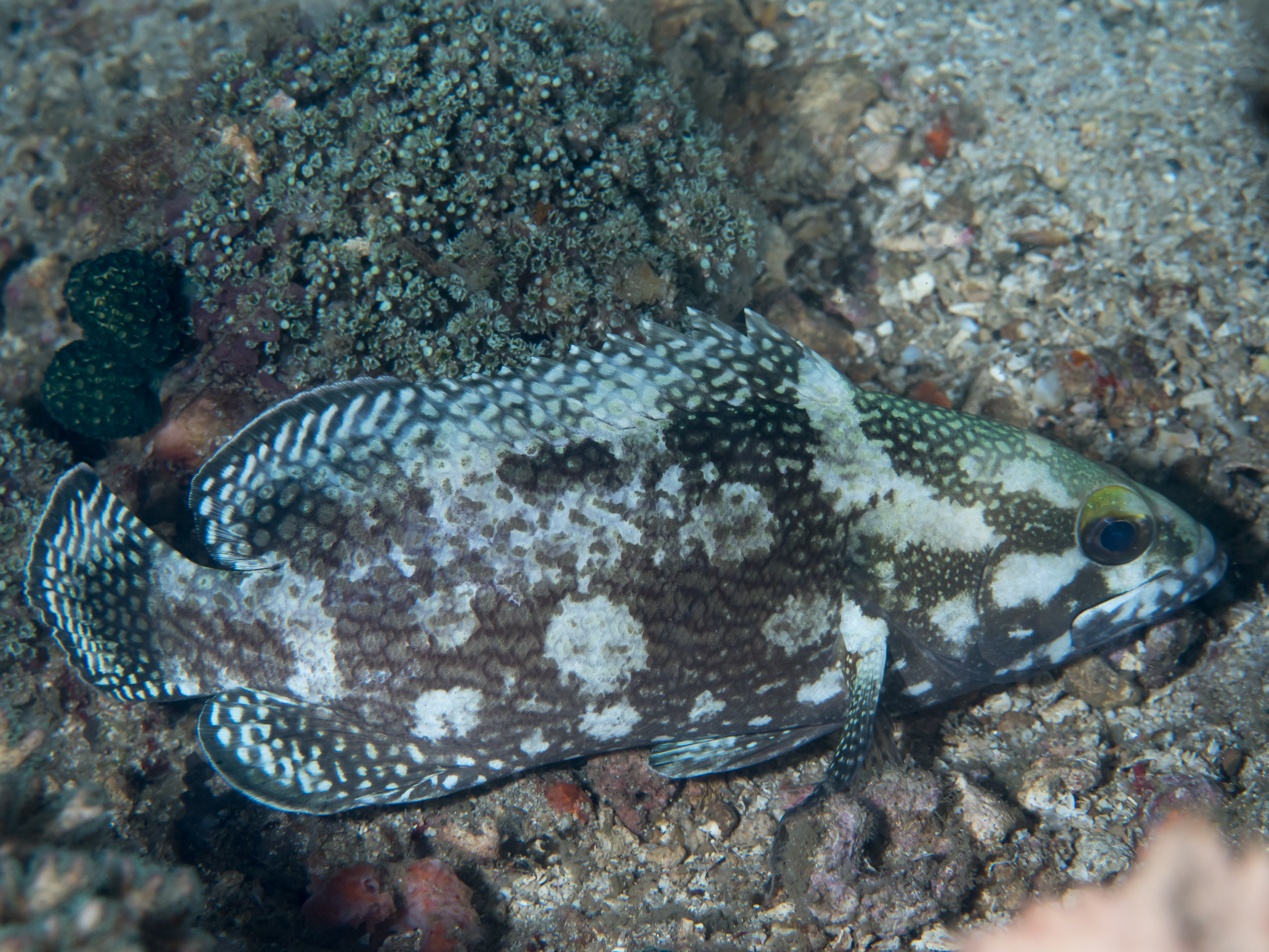

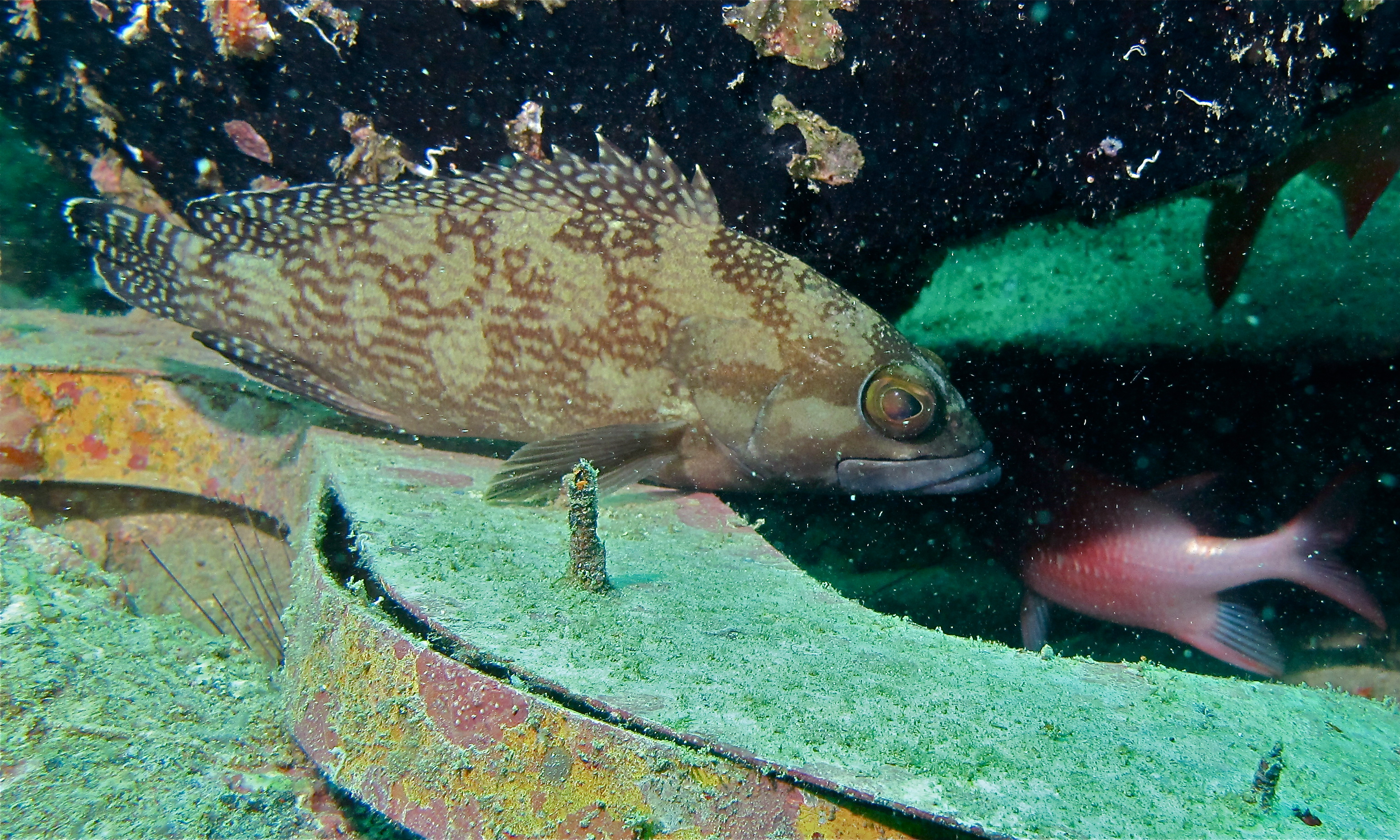

== Distribution ==
Epinephelus ongus has a wide Indo-Pacific distribution. It is found in the east African coast from Somalia to South Africa and Madagascar. It is then found in the Seychelles and the Maldives and southern India and Sri Lanka along the coasts of Thailand and Malaysia east into the Pacific Ocean as far as New Caledonia and Tonga. They are found as far north as the Ryukyu Islands and Ogasawara Islands in southern Japan and south to Australia. In Australia it is found around the offshore reefs of Western Australia, off Arnhem Land in the Northern Territory and the Great Barrier Reef off Queensland.

== Habitat and biology ==
Epinephelus ongus is found on inner coastal and lagoon reefs, as well as in brackish waters where it can be found in ledges and caves, at depths between 5 and 25 metres (16 and 82 ft). Adults are normally found in deeper water than juveniles. The main prey of this species are crustaceans and small fishes. Off Okinawa this species is associated with branching corals such as Acropora. It is likelyto be a protogynous hermaphrodite, with half of the fish changing sex at a total length of 27.2 centimetres (10.7 in) and 7 years of age. They have been reported to form spawning aggregations and, off Olinanwa, these were formed over a sand and rubble seabed in the vicinity of a pass between areas of reed and fish moved to spawn here form an average distance of 5 to 6 kilometres (3.1 to 3.7 miles). Groupers, as other fish, have usually a number of parasites. Not much is known about the parasitological fauna of the white-streaked grouper. In New Caledonia, it has a diplectanid monogenean on its gills, Pseudorhabdosynochus quadratus, which is specific to it. Other endoparasites known from this species are Lepidapedoides angustus and Pearsonellum corventum, both Digeneans.

== Taxonomy ==
Epinephelus ongus was first formally described as Holocentrus ongus in 1790 by the German medical doctor and naturalist Marcus Elieser Bloch (1723–1799) with the type locality given as Japan but this is thought to be an error and should be Java. Its closest relative appears to Epinephelus summana which is restricted to the Red Sea where E. ongus is absent.

== Utilisation ==
Epinephelus ongus is an uncommon species but which is targeted by commercial fisheries in parts of its range. It is caught using hook and line, gillnets, spears and traps and it is found in the live reef food fish trade in south-east Asia.
