= Pseudorhabdosynochus bacchus =

Scientific classification
- Kingdom: Animalia
- Phylum: Platyhelminthes
- Class: Monogenea
- Order: Dactylogyridea
- Family: Diplectanidae
- Genus: Pseudorhabdosynochus
- Species: P. bacchus

Binomial name
- Pseudorhabdosynochus bacchus Sigura, Chauvet & Justine, 2007

Species of flatworm

Pseudorhabdosynochus bacchus is a diplectanid monogenean parasitic on the gills of groupers. It was described in 2007.

== Description and etymology ==
Pseudorhabdosynochus bacchus is a small monogenean. The species has the general characteristics of other species of Pseudorhabdosynochus, with a flat body and a posterior haptor, which is the organ by which the monogenean attaches itself to the gill of is host. The haptor bears two squamodiscs, one ventral and one dorsal.

The sclerotized male copulatory organ, or "quadriloculate organ", has the shape of a bean with four internal chambers, as in other species of Pseudorhabdosynochus.

The vagina includes a sclerotized part, which is a complex structure. According to the authors of the taxon, the name of the species was chosen for Bacchus (Latin), the mythological God of wine, because of "the shape of the primary chamber of the sclerotised vagina, which resembles a glass of wine".

== Hosts and localities ==
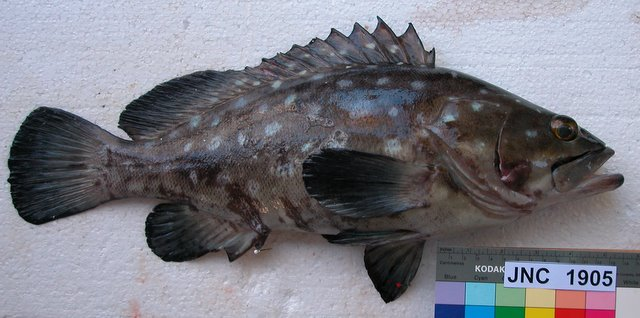
The whitespotted grouper Epinephelus coeruleopunctatus is the type-host of Pseudorhabdosynochus argus.

The whitespotted grouper, Epinephelus coeruleopunctatus, is the type-host of Pseudorhabdosynochus argus. The type-locality is the barrier reef off Nouméa, New Caledonia.
