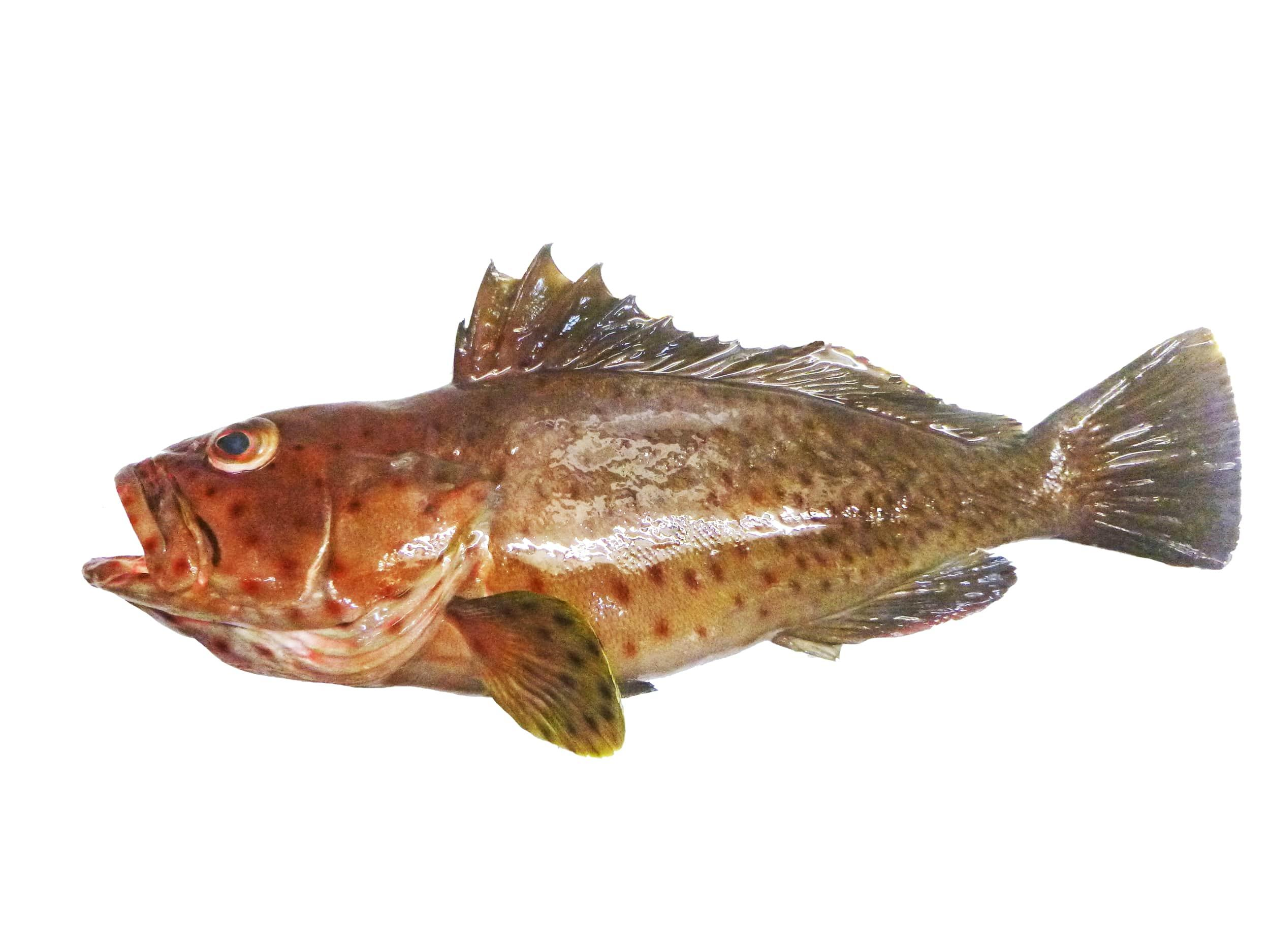
- Specimen from Réunion

Conservation status
- Least Concern (IUCN 3.1)

Scientific classification
- Kingdom: Animalia
- Phylum: Chordata
- Class: Actinopterygii
- Order: Perciformes
- Family: Epinephelidae
- Genus: Epinephelus
- Species: E. longispinis

Binomial name
- Epinephelus longispinis Kner, 1864

= Epinephelus longispinis =

Species of fish

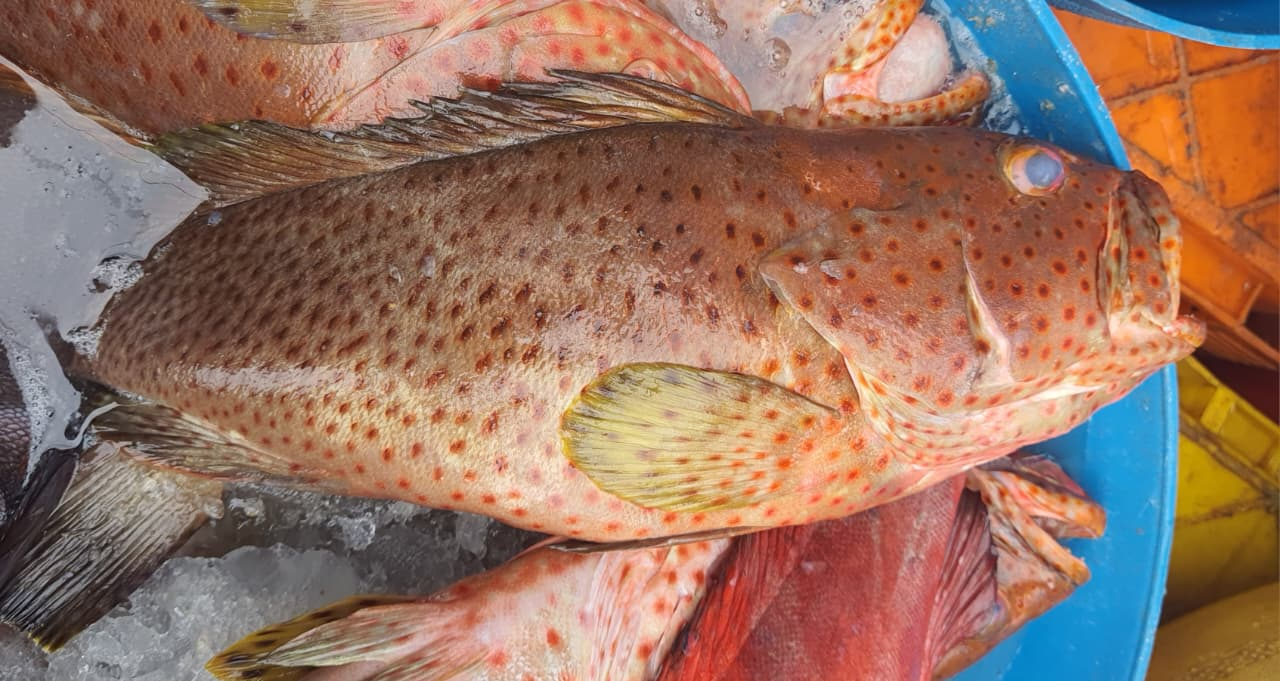
Epinephelus longispinis

Epinephelus longispinis, also called the longspine grouper or the streaky spot grouper is a species of marine ray-finned fish from the Epinephelus genus.

According to the World Register of Marine Species E. longispinis' diet consists primarily of crustaceans, "especially crabs and stomatopods." The species' range is primarily in the Indian and Western Pacific Oceans.
