= Epinephelus fuscomarginatus =

Scientific classification
- Kingdom: Animalia
- Phylum: Chordata
- Class: Actinopterygii
- Order: Perciformes
- Family: Epinephelidae
- Genus: Epinephelus
- Species: E. fuscomarginatus

Binomial name
- Epinephelus fuscomarginatus Johnson & Worthington Wilmer, 2019

Species of fish

Epinephelus fuscomarginatus, the darkmargin grouper, is a species of marine ray-finned fish, a grouper from the subfamily Epinephelinae which is part of the family Serranidae, which also includes the anthias and sea basses. It is found off the coast of eastern Australia.

== Description ==
Epinephelus fuscomarginatus has a body which has a standard length 3.0 to 3.4 times its depth. The preopercle has a rounded angle which has 4-9 small serrations. The dorsal fin contains 11 spines and 14 soft rays while the anal fin has 3 spines and 8 soft rays. The caudal fin is rounded. There are 60-67 scales in the lateral line. The flanks are marked with diffuse, irregular brown bars and blotches and there are wide dark brown margins to the soft rayed part of the dorsal fin, anal fin and caudal fins. It also has two indistinct, light brown bars which radiate from the eye to the rear edge of the gill cover in non sexually mature fish. There are no dark spots on the head, body and fins of this fish at any stage of its life. This species attains a length of at least 70 centimetres (28 in).

== Distribution ==
Epinephelus fuscomarginatus is endemic to the Great Barrier Reef off Queensland. Here it has been recorded from the Capricorn Channel off the southern end of Swains Reefs to the east of the Capricorn-Bunker group.

== Habitat ==
Epinephelus fuscomarginatus inhabits reefs at depths of up to 220 m (720 ft).

== Taxonomy ==
Epinephelus fuscomarginatus was first formally described in 2019 by Jeffrey W. Johnston and Jessica Worthington Wilmer with the type locality given as Capricorn Channel, south of Swain Reefs, Queensland. The first five specimens were purchased by Mr. Johnson from a fish market in Brisbane's North Lakes after a fisherman had sent him a photograph and he suspected that they were an undescribed species.

== Utilisation ==
Epinephelus fuscomarginatus is caught using longlines and has been recorded in fish markets.

== See also ==
- Grouper fish
