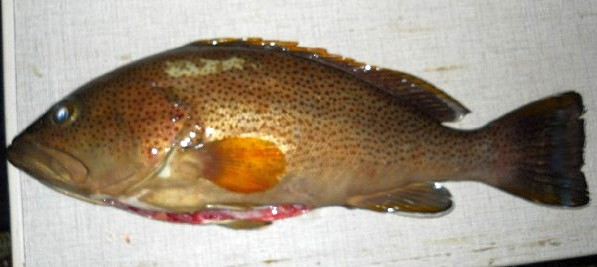

Conservation status
- Vulnerable (IUCN 3.1)

Scientific classification
- Kingdom: Animalia
- Phylum: Chordata
- Class: Actinopterygii
- Order: Perciformes
- Family: Epinephelidae
- Genus: Epinephelus
- Species: E. albomarginatus

Binomial name
- Epinephelus albomarginatus Boulenger, 1903

= Epinephelus albomarginatus =

Species of fish

Epinephelus albomarginatus, the white-edged grouper, white-edged rockcod or captain fine, is a species of marine ray-finned fish, a grouper from the subfamily Epinephelinae which is part of the family Serranidae, which also includes the anthias and sea basses. It is found in the southwestern Indian Ocean and it is associated with coral reefs. It is a target species for commercial and recreational fisheries.

== Description ==
Epinephelus albomarginatus has a body with a standard length which is 2.6 to 3.0 times as long as its depth. The preopercle has an angle and has 2-3 enlarged serrations at its angle. The dorsal fin has 11 spines and 14 soft rays while the anal fin contains 3 spines and 8 so rays. The membranes between the dorsal fin spines are obviously incised. The pelvic fins are as long as or slightly longer than the pectoral fins while the caudal fin is truncate, the corners of the caudal fin are rounded in adults. The jaws are armed with two rows of teeth, the outer row being enlarged. There are 56 to 66 scales in the lateral line. The basic colour of the head, body, dorsal, and caudal fins is pale brown, with many small darker brown spots. These are absent on the underside of the head and body. The juveniles have a prominent dark brown streak above their lips and many of the spots on the head, body and median fins merge to form double spots. The dorsal fin has a yellow or gold margin to the membranes in its spiny part. The soft-rayed part of the dorsal fin and the anal fin are dusky away from their bases and have a distinct white margin. The caudal fin has a white margin on its upper and lower distal edges also white-edged while the pectoral fins are yellowish or reddish orange. The maximum published total length for this species is 100 centimetres (39 in) and the maximum published weight is 125 kilograms (276 lb).

== Distribution ==
Epinephelus albomarginatus is endemic to the eastern coast of Southern Africa where it occurs from Zavala in southern Mozambique to East London in the Eastern Cape of South Africa.

== Habitat and biology ==
Epinephelus albomarginatus is found on rocky and coral reefs at depths between 25 and 120 metres (82 and 394 ft)> This is a predatory species which preys largely on spiny lobsters, crab and octopuses, it will also eat fish and squid. These fish grow slowly and they are monandric protogynous hermaphrodites, which means that all of the males are derived from reproductively functional females. Fish sampled along the eastern coast of South Africa are normally sexually immature and this suggests that there may be a northward movement of fish to spawn. Adults remain off northern Kwaulu Natal and southern Mozambique.

== Taxonomy ==
Epinephelus albomarginatus was first formally described in 1903 by the Belgian-British ichthyologist George Albert Boulenger (1858-1937) with the type locality being given as the Colony of Natal.

== Utilisation ==
Epinephelus albomarginatus is targeted by both recreational and commercial fisheries. In South Africa the traditional commercial fishery uses hook and lines from vessels, while in Mozambique line fishing is also used with both handlines and rod and line being used. The catch is sold locally and is also exported to Europe. The slow growth, late maturity and protogynous hermaphroditic life history of this species make it vulnerable to overfishing.

== Conservation ==
Epinephelus albomarginatus is classified as Vulnerable by the IUCN because it has a small area of distribution and has been overfished, causing a substantial reduction in the population of reproductively active individuals. It does occur in some protected areas in both South Africa and Mozambique. In South Africa this species is subject to management by a total allowable effort limitation on commercial fisheries as well as by additional restrictions which are designed to protect overfished species. These include a bag limit of 5 fish per person per day and minimum allowable size of 40 cm for landing for recreational fishers. However, catches outside of the total allowable effort limitation and the increase in recreational angling are still causing concern. In Mozambique the species is subject to a management plan.
