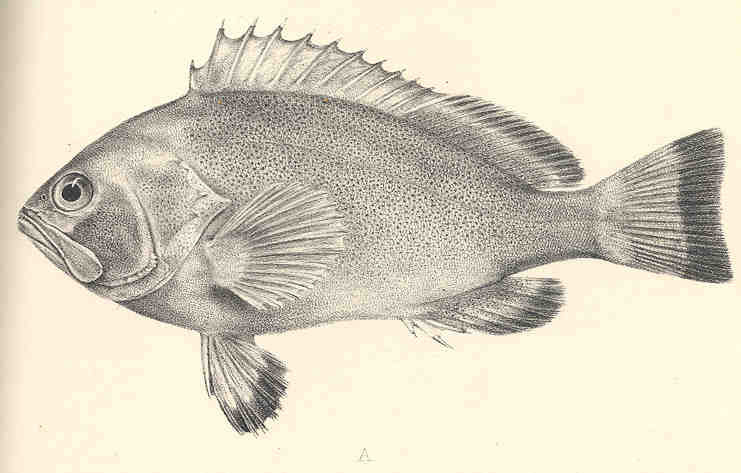

Conservation status
- Least Concern (IUCN 3.1)

Scientific classification
- Kingdom: Animalia
- Phylum: Chordata
- Class: Actinopterygii
- Division: Teleostei
- Order: Perciformes
- Family: Epinephelidae
- Genus: Epinephelus
- Species: E. irroratus

Binomial name
- Epinephelus irroratus (Forster, 1801)

Synonyms
- Perca var. irrorata Forster, 1801; Serranus spiniger Günther, 1859; Epinephelus spiniger (Günther, 1859); Epinephelus albopunctulatus Boulenger, 1895

= Marquesan grouper =

Species of fish

The Marquesan grouper (Epinephelus irroratus) is a species of marine ray-finned fish, a grouper from the subfamily Epinephelinae which is part of the family Serranidae, which also includes the anthias and sea basses. It is endemic to French Polynesia. Its natural habitats are open seas, shallow seas, subtidal aquatic beds, and coral reefs.

== Description ==
The Marquesan grouper has a body which has a standard length that is 2.7 to 3.3 times its depth. The dorsal profile of the head is slightly convex. The finely serrated preopercle has a rounded corner which also has a slight indentation, the serrations on the lower edge are slightly enlarged. The upper edge of the gill cover is nearly straight. There are 11 spines in the dorsal fin and 16 soft rays while the anal fin contains 3 spines and 8 soft rays. The caudal fin is truncate or marginally rounded. This species is reddish-brown in colour with a white dot on each scale leading to the appearance of fine, white speckling. There is a dark reddish-brown stripe on the maxilla. The membrane between the dorsal fine spines is red while the posterior edges of the dorsal, anal, caudal and pectoral fins shows a white line. This species attains a maximum standard length of 37 centimetres (15 in) and has a maximum published weight of 770 grams (1.70 lb).

== Distribution ==
The Marquesan grouper is endemic to the Marquesas Islands in French Polynesia, records from Japan and the Philippines are thought to be erroneous.

== Habitat and biology ==
The Marquesan grouper is found at depths of 20 to 50 metres (66 to 164 ft) where it lives among rocky and coral reefs, other than that little information has been published on the biology of this species.

== Taxonomy ==
The Marquesan grouper was first formally described in 1801 as Perca var. irrorata by the German naturalist and Calvinist pastor Johann Reinhold Forster (1729–1798). This was published in Bloch & Schneider's Systema Ichthyologiae and the type locality was given as St. Christian Island, now called Tahuata, in the Marquesas Islands.

== Utilisation ==
The Marquesan grouper is taken by local fisheries and all fish landed are marketed locally. They are caught using spears, hook and line and traps.
