= Epinephelus undulatostriatus =

Scientific classification
- Kingdom: Animalia
- Phylum: Chordata
- Class: Actinopterygii
- Division: Teleostei
- Order: Perciformes
- Family: Epinephelidae
- Genus: Epinephelus
- Species: E. undulatostriatus

Binomial name
- Epinephelus undulatostriatus (Peters, 1866)

Species of fish

Epinephelus undulatostriatus, the Maori grouper or Maori rockcod, is a species of marine ray-finned fish in the grouper family Epinephelidae. It is endemic to eastern Australia.

== Taxonomy ==
The Maori grouper was first described as Serranus undulatostriatus in 1866.

== Distribution ==
In New South Wales, close to Sydney

The Maori grouper is endemic to eastern Australia. It can be found as far north as One Tree Island in southern Queensland, to at least as far south as Batemans Bay in New South Wales. Further offshore, it is also present around Lord Howe Island.

It is possibly present at Kangaroo Island in South Australia.
