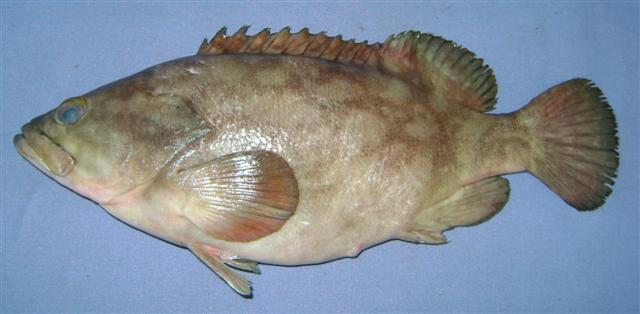

Conservation status
- Least Concern (IUCN 3.1)

Scientific classification
- Kingdom: Animalia
- Phylum: Chordata
- Class: Actinopterygii
- Order: Perciformes
- Family: Epinephelidae
- Genus: Epinephelus
- Species: E. erythrurus

Binomial name
- Epinephelus erythrurus (Valenciennes, 1828)

Synonyms
- Serranus erythrurus Valenciennes, 1828; Epinephelus townsendi Boulenger, 1898

= Epinephelus erythrurus =

Species of fish

Epinephelus erythrurus, the cloudy grouper, also known as the cloudy rock cod, is a species of marine ray-finned fish, a grouper from the subfamily Epinephelinae which is part of the family Serranidae, which also includes the anthias and sea basses. It is found in marine and brackish waters in the Indo-Pacific region.

== Description ==
Epinephelus erythrurus has a body which has a standard length which is around 2.8 to 3.2 times its depth. The dorsal profile of the head is nearly straight while the preopercle is finely serrated and rounded with the lower serrations being slightly enlarged. The upper edge of the gill cover is straight, except for a bend at its upper end. The dorsal fin has 11 spines and 15-17 soft rays while the anal fin contains 3 spines and 8 soft rays. The caudal fin is markedly rounded. There are 53-62 scales in the lateral line. The overall colour of its body is olive to reddish brown and they are normally with irregular pale spots and blotches that merge to create an irregular dark web from the basic colour. There are three dark streaks across the gill cover, the widest and darkest runs from eye to lower edge of the gill cover, the next runs from lower edge of eye to subopercle, and the third is the most indistinct and runs from the dark streak on the upper jaw to the lower edge of preopercle. The dorsal, anal, caudal and pelvic fins are mottled while the pectoral fins are plain. Some of the larger individuals are almost plain brown in colour brown with indistinct blotches just visible. This species attains a total length of 45 centimetres (18 in).

== Distribution ==
Epinephelus erythrurus is found in the Indian Ocean and Western Pacific Ocean. It occurs from Pakistan and India to the South China Sea, its range includes the Lakshadweep Islands, Sri Lanka, the Andaman Islands and the Nicobar Islands, as well as Indonesia.

== Habitat and biology ==
Epinephelus erythrurus is found in areas with soft substrates including harbours and estuaries. vert little has been published on its biology.

== Taxonomy ==
Epinephelus erythrurus was first formally described as Serranus erythrurus in 1828 by the French zoologist Achille Valenciennes (1794-1865) with the type locality given as the Malabar coast.
