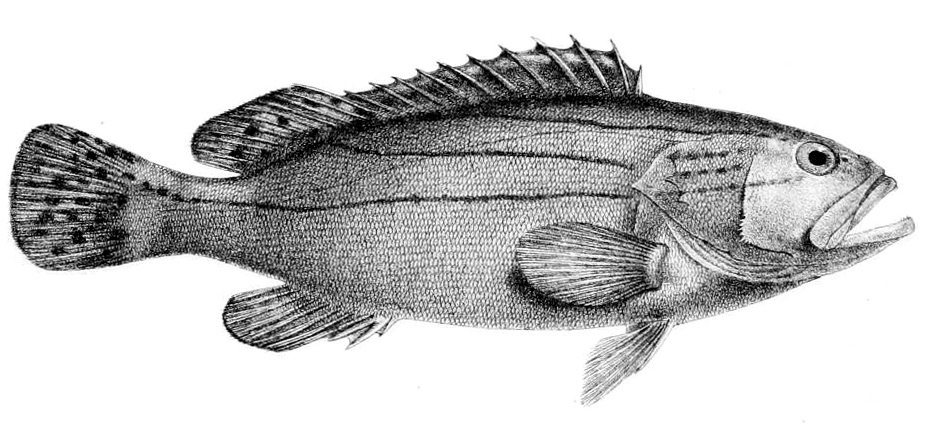

Conservation status
- Least Concern (IUCN 3.1)

Scientific classification
- Kingdom: Animalia
- Phylum: Chordata
- Class: Actinopterygii
- Order: Perciformes
- Family: Epinephelidae
- Genus: Epinephelus
- Species: E. latifasciatus

Binomial name
- Epinephelus latifasciatus (Temminck & Schlegel, 1843)

Synonyms
- Serranus latifasciatus Temminck & Schlegel, 1843; Priacanthichthys maderaspatensis Day, 1868; Serranus grammicus Day, 1868; Epinephelus grammicus (Day, 1868)

= Epinephelus latifasciatus =

Species of fish

Epinephelus latifasciatus, the striped grouper, banded grouper or spotfin rockcod, is a species of marine ray-finned fish, a grouper from the subfamily Epinephelinae which is part of the family Serranidae, which also includes the anthias and sea basses. It is found in the Indo-Pacific region.

== Description ==
Epinephelus latifasciatus has a body with a standard length which is 2.9 to 3.4 times its depth. The dorsal profile of the head and area between the eyes is convex. The angular preopercle has a finely serrated margin with the serrations at the angle being enlarged. The dorsal fin contains 11 spines and 12-14 soft rays while the anal fin has 3 spines and 8 soft rays. The caudal fin is truncate, in adults and rounded in juveniles. The colour of the head and body is greyish brown and there are two pale longitudinal stripes which have black margins and contain dark dots. The upper stripe runs from above the eye to the soft-rayed part of the dorsal fin while the lower stripe runs from underneath the eye to the caudal fin. The dorsal and caudal fins are marked with black spots and streaks. This pattern is most obvious in juveniles, which may be lavender-grey or pale brownish in background colour, and fades with adults so that larger adults may be plain greyish brown. This species has a maximum published standard length of 127 centimetres (50 in), although they are more commonly 70 centimetres (28 in), and a maximum published weight of 58.6 kilograms (129 lb).

== Distribution ==
Epinephelus latifasciatus is found in the Indo-Pacific region where it is found in the Red Sea, the Persian Gulf and the Gulf of Oman to India and Sri Lanka east to Taiwan and southern Japan. It is found in northwestern Australia from the north west coast of Western Australia to the Arafura Sea coast of the Northern Territory. It has not been recorded from East Africa, the Indian Ocean islands, the Philippines or Papua New Guinea. This species appear to prefer continental coastlines rather than islands.

== Habitat and biology ==
Epinephelus latifasciatus is found at depths of 20 to 230 metres (66 to 755 ft) over rocky or coarse sandy bottoms which are of uniform structure, although juveniles are found over silt or mud. In Indian waters the spawning season runs from November to March.

== Taxonomy ==
Epinephelus latifasciatus was first formally described as Serranus latifasciatus in 1843 by the Dutch zoologist Coenraad Jacob Temminck (1778-1858) and his student, the German ichthyologist Hermann Schlegel (1804-1884), with the type locality given as Nagasaki.

== Utilisation ==
Epinephelus latifasciatus is caught using hook and line, longline, trawl and trap. It is common in east Asian markets but is not a target for commercial fisheries in the Persian Gulf while in India it is marketed but seems to be taken as bycatch in fisheries targeting other species.
