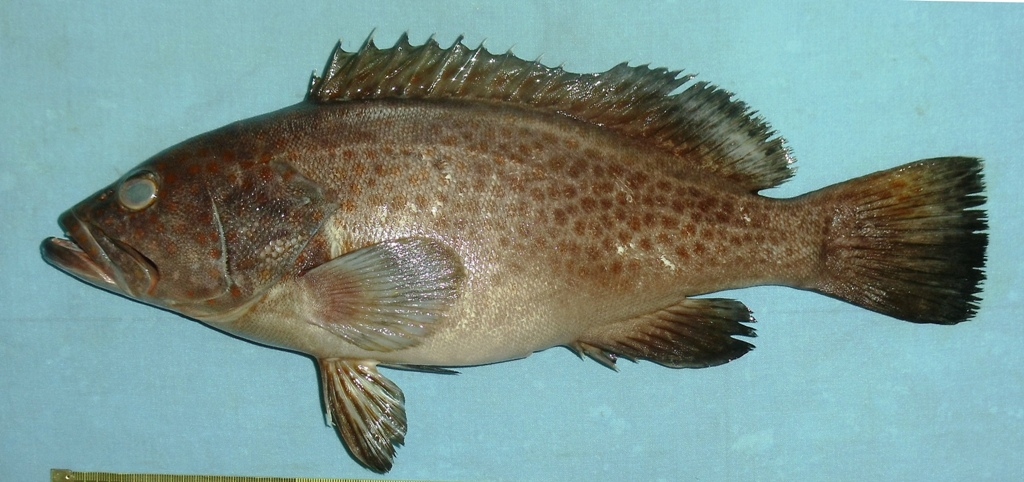

Conservation status
- Data Deficient (IUCN 3.1)

Scientific classification
- Kingdom: Animalia
- Phylum: Chordata
- Class: Actinopterygii
- Order: Perciformes
- Family: Epinephelidae
- Genus: Epinephelus
- Species: E. bleekeri

Binomial name
- Epinephelus bleekeri (Vaillant, 1878)

Synonyms
- Serranus bleekeri Vaillant, 1878; Acanthistius bleekeri (Vaillant, 1878); Epinephelus dayi Bleeker, 1875; Serranus coromandelicus Day, 1878; Epinephelus albimaculatus Seale, 1910

= Epinephelus bleekeri =

Species of fish

Epinephelus bleekeri, the duskytail grouper, Bleeker's grouper or Bleeker's rockcod, is a species of marine ray-finned fish, a grouper from the subfamily Epinephelinae which is part of the family Serranidae, which also includes the anthias and sea basses. It is found in the Indo-Pacific region where it is associated with shallow banks.

== Description ==
Epinephelus bleekeri has an elongate body which has a standard length that is 3.0 to 3.5 times as long as it is deep. The preopercle has 2 to 9 enlarged serrations at its angles and, in adults, there is a notch above that angle. The upper edge of the gill cover is straight. The dorsal fin contains 11 spines and 16–18 soft rays while the anal fin has 3 spines and 8–9 soft rays. The caudal fin is truncate or rounded and the pelvic fins are short. The head and body have a background colour which is brownish, reddish brown or purplish grey and it is covered, other than on the underside, with many reddish orange, gold, or yellow spots. The dorsal fin and upper third of the caudal fin are spotted like the body. The remainder of the caudal fin is dusky. In some fish the spots on the body have an indistinct dark margin. The pectoral and pelvic fins, as well as the outer part of the anal fin are dusky. There is a dark streak like a moustache along the maxillary groove. Juveniles, i.e. up to 11 centimetres (4.3 in) standard length, have 7 faint dark bars on the upper body. The first two bars are on the nape and the last is on the caudal peduncle and all 7 bars have small dark spots along their margins. There are no dark spots on the head or fins. The maximum recorded length is 76 centimetres (30 in).

== Distribution ==
Epinephelus bleekeri is found in the Indo-Pacific region where it is found from the Persian Gulf to Taiwan through Indonesia to northern Australia. It also occurs in the Solomon Islands, although its presence in Japan is unconfirmed and it is absent from Polynesia and Micronesia. In Australia its range goes from Shark Bay, Western Australia, to the Cobourg Peninsula in the Northern Territory.

== Habitat ==
Epinephelus bleekeri is a benthic species which can ben found on shallow banks and nearby areas with soft substrates as well as in silty coastal reefs and estuaries at depths of 30–105 metres (98–344 ft).

== Taxonomy ==
Epiphenelus bleekeri was first formally described as Serranus bleekeri by the French Léon Vaillant (1834–1914) with the type locality given as Jakarta.

== Utilisation ==
Epinephelus bleekeri is a commercially important species which is fished for using long lines, hook and line and trawls. It is cultured in aquaculture using wild caught fry which are then grown for the live seafood trade.
