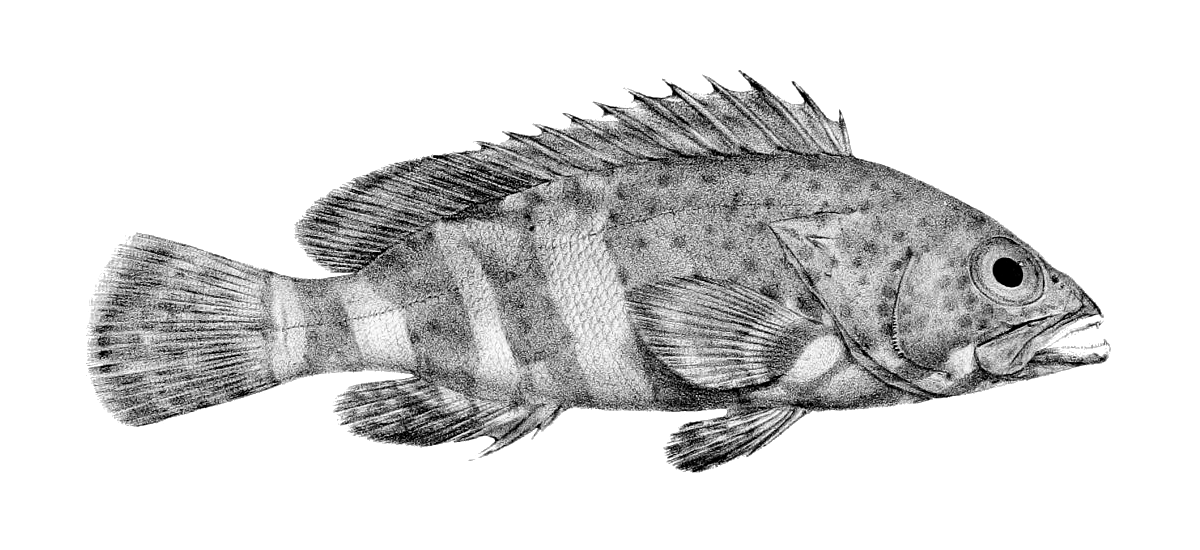

Conservation status
- Least Concern (IUCN 3.1)

Scientific classification
- Kingdom: Animalia
- Phylum: Chordata
- Class: Actinopterygii
- Order: Perciformes
- Suborder: Percoidei
- Family: Epinephelidae
- Genus: Epinephelus
- Species: E. stoliczkae

Binomial name
- Epinephelus stoliczkae (Day, 1875)

= Epinephelus stoliczkae =

Species of fish

Epinephelus stoliczkae, the epaulet grouper, is a tropical fish species in the family Serranidae and in the genus Epinephelus.

Epaulet groupers have two-part dorsal fin, of which the spiny part consist of eleven spines whereas the soft part consist of 16-18 rays. Anal fin of this species has three spine rays and eight soft rays. It is reported that Epaulet grouper can grow up to 38 centimeters in size. Epinephelus coioides is a very similar species, and Epinephelus rivulatus is also similar to the Epaulet grouper and these two species can be confused between each other.

Epaulet grouper is known for depths from 5 to 50 meters. Its distribution covers Red Sea (also Gulf of Suez) and Indian Ocean's northwestern parts to the coast of Pakistan. There are no observations of this species from the Gulf of Aqaba.
