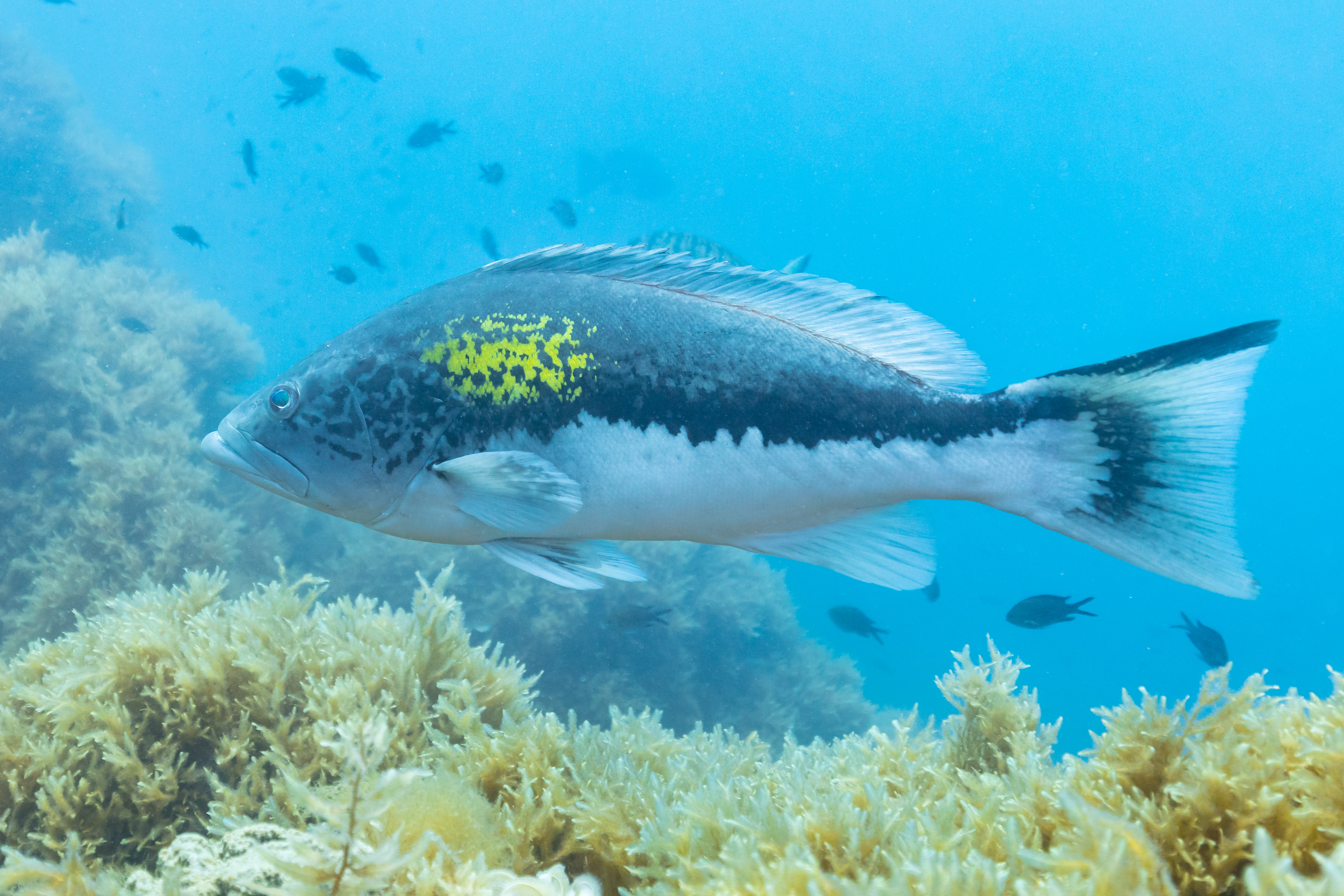
- Adult in Spain

Scientific classification
- Kingdom: Animalia
- Phylum: Chordata
- Class: Actinopterygii
- Division: Teleostei
- Order: Perciformes
- Family: Epinephelidae
- Genus: Epinephelus
- Species: E. costae

Binomial name
- Epinephelus costae (Steindachner, 1878)

Synonyms
- List: Cerna catalonica Gibert, 1913; Cerna chrysotaenia Döderlein, 1882; Epinephelus zaslavskii Poll, 1949; Mycteroperca costae (Steindachner, 1878); Plectropoma fasciatus Costa, 1844; Serranus costae Steindachner, 1878

= Epinephelus costae =

Species of grouper

Epinephelus costae, the gold-blotch grouper, is a marine ray-finned fish in the grouper family Epinephelidae. It occurs in the eastern Atlantic Ocean and the Mediterranean Sea, where it can be found in shallow coastal waters.

== Description ==
The gold-blotch grouper grows up 1.4 m SL. The striped juveniles look strikingly different from adult fish, such that they were considered different species until 1882.

=== Color change ===
Although adults typically exhibit the yellow blotch characteristic of this species, they can change color so that the yellow blotch disappears, the fish becoming instead marked by longitudinal stripes; these stripes are another characteristic trait of this species. The yellow blotch also tends to disappear after death.

== Habitat ==
The gold-blotch grouper can be found in shallow coastal waters, usually at depths of less than 80 m. However, it may venture to depths of up to 200 m.

== Biology ==
The overwhelming majority of the gold-blotch grouper's diet is composed of fish, but it will also feed on crustaceans and cephalopods.

== Gallery ==
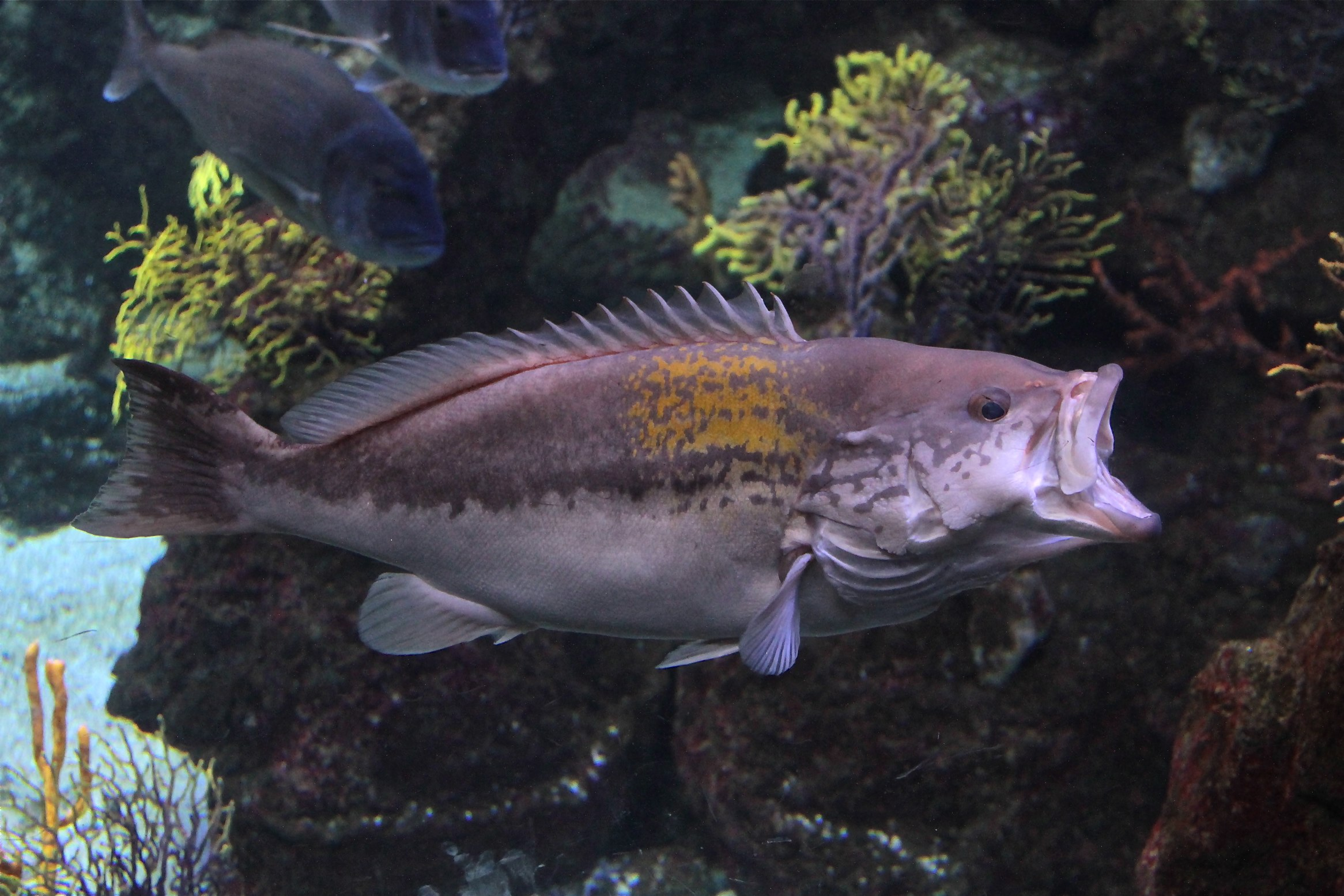
At L´Aquàrium de Barcelona

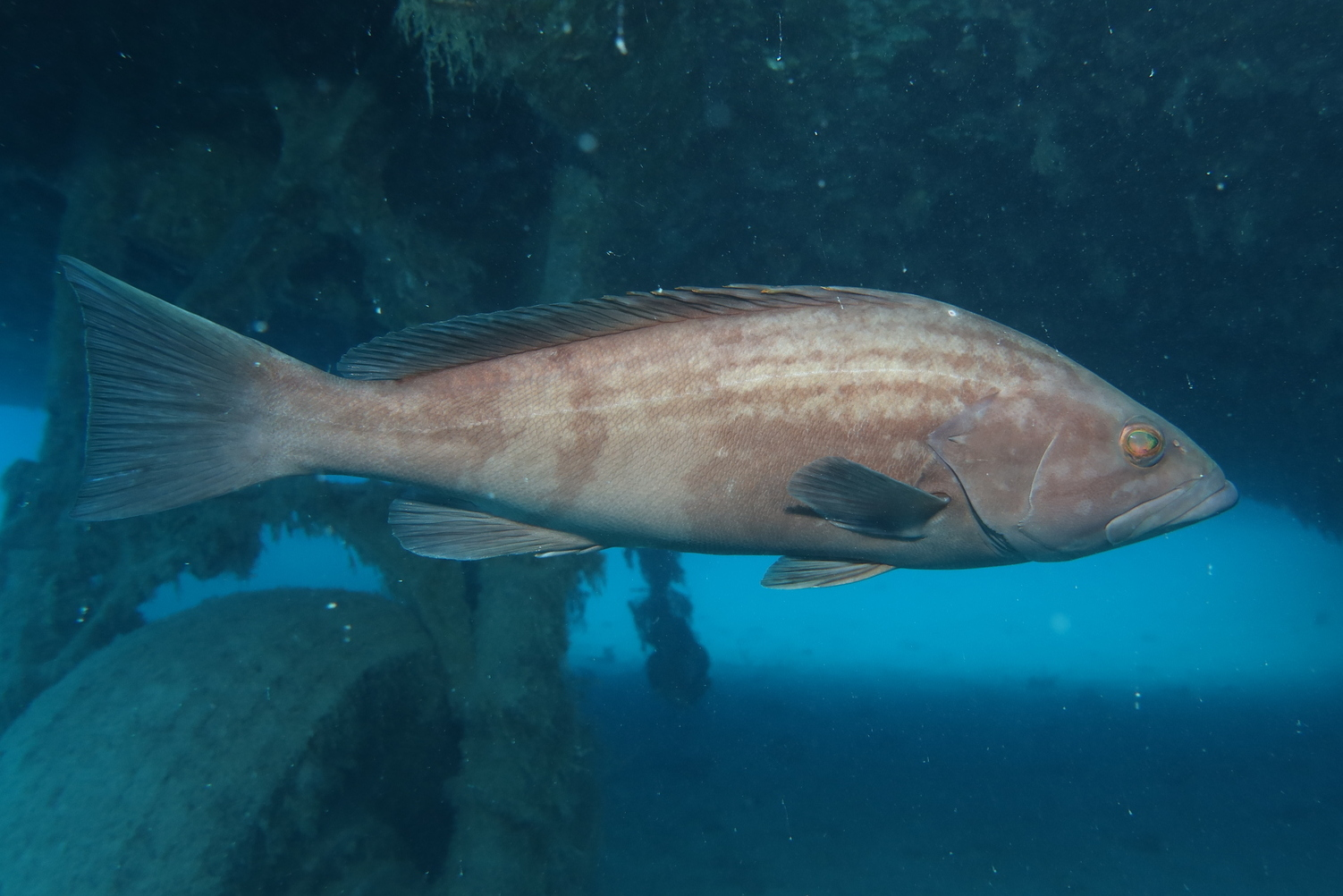
Without yellow blotch

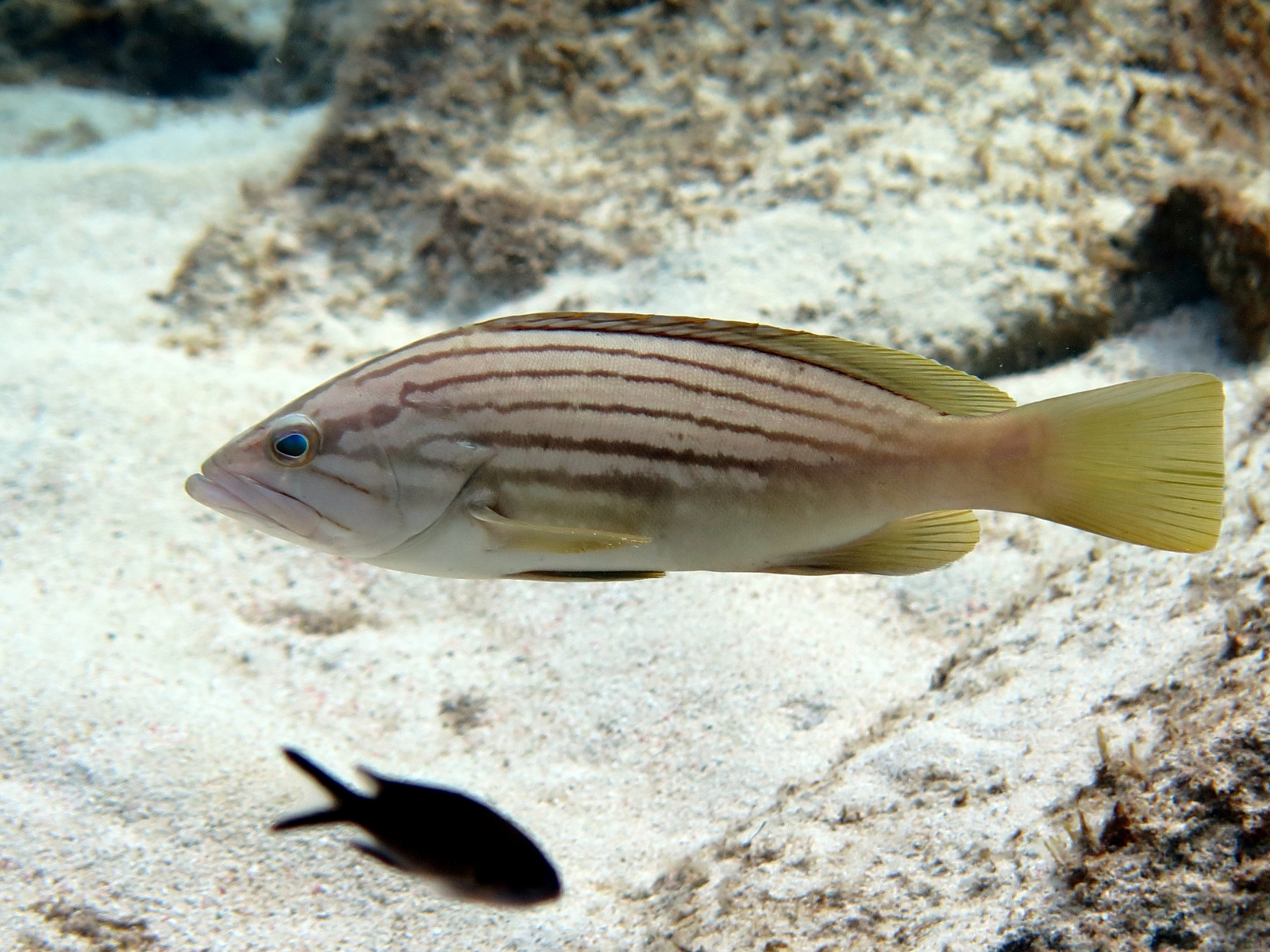
Showing horizontal stripes

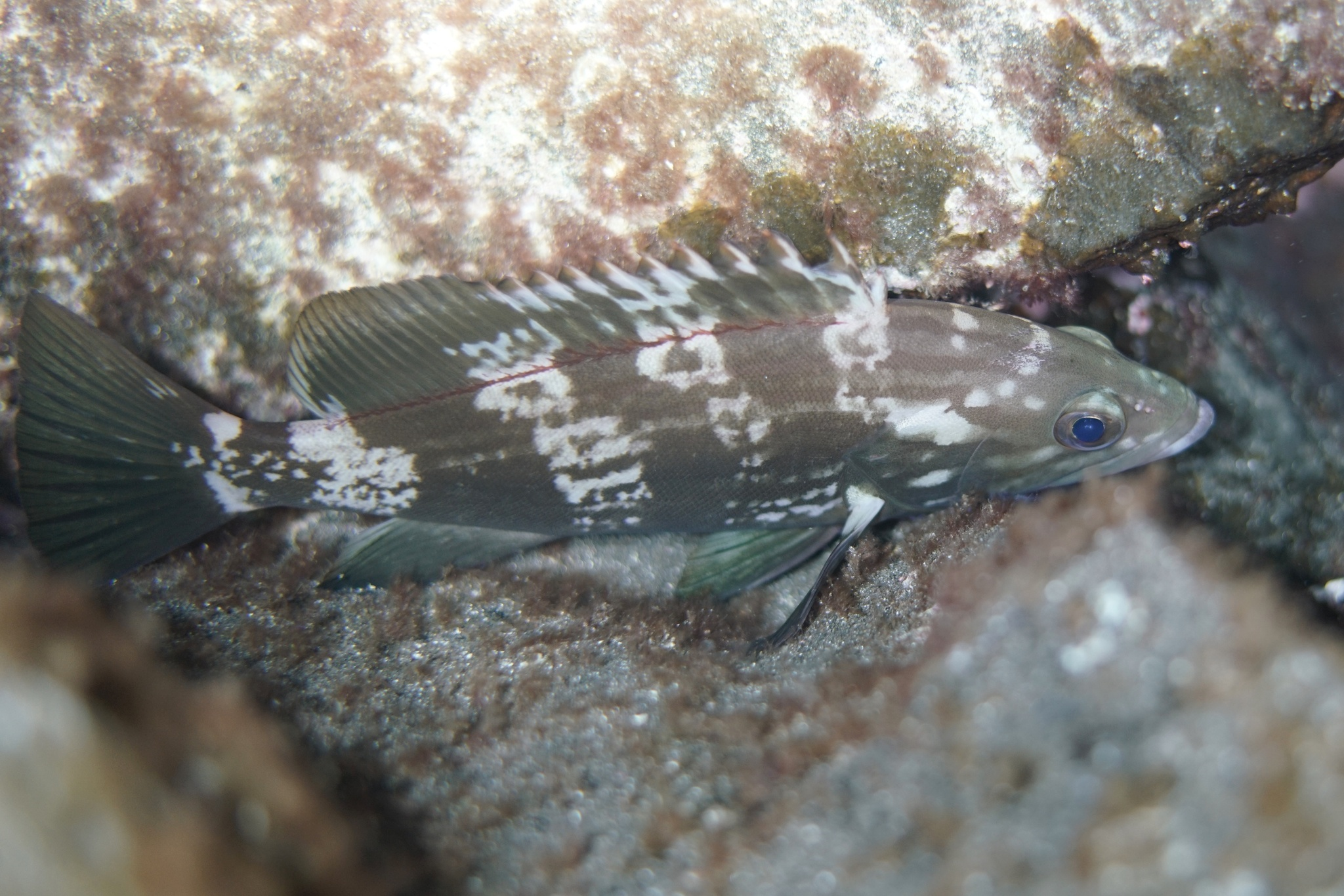
At Tenerife. This colour pattern was first documented in the Adriatic Sea, and is similar to that of the dusky grouper (E. marginatus)
