= Epinephelus heniochus =

Conservation status
- Least Concern (IUCN 3.1)

Scientific classification
- Kingdom: Animalia
- Phylum: Chordata
- Class: Actinopterygii
- Order: Perciformes
- Family: Epinephelidae
- Genus: Epinephelus
- Species: E. heniochus

Binomial name
- Epinephelus heniochus Fowler, 1904

Synonyms
- Epinephelus hata Katayama, 1953

Species of fish

Epinephelus heniochus, the bridled grouper or threeline rockcod, is a species of marine ray-finned fish, a grouper from the subfamily Epinephelinae, part of the family Serranidae, which also includes the anthias and sea basses. It is native to the tropical western Pacific Ocean.

== Description ==
Epinephelus heniochus has a body with a standard length that is 2.7 to 3.1 times its depth. The area between the eyes is slightly convex, whereas the dorsal profile of the head is markedly convex. The preopercle is sharply angled, with 2–4 large spines located at its angle. The dorsal fin contains 11 spines and 14–15 soft rays, while the anal fin has three spines and soft rays. The upper head and body are pale brown, fading to whitish or pale pink on the lower head and body. A minority of individuals have very small brownish black spots on the body and posterior part of the head. There is an indisinct dark brown stripe which runs from the eve to rear margin of the gill cover, and another darker stripe which runs from the lower edge of eye to the subopercle, while a third stripe runs from front of the eye and sips between the preopercle and the gill cover. The pectoral fins are translucent greyish yellow, and the lower section of caudal fin is sometimes darker than the remainder of the fin. The membranes between dorsal fin spines have a yellow margin. This species attains a maximum total length of 55 centimetres (22 in).

== Distribution ==
Epinephelus heniochus occurs in the tropical Western Pacific Ocean from the Andaman Sea and the Gulf of Thailand to New Britain in Papua New Guinea, south to the Arafura Sea, Timor Sea and Gulf of Carpentaria coasts of Australia, and north to Japan and South Korea.

== Habitat and biology ==
Epinephelus heniochus is found at depths from 40 to 235 metres (131 to 771 ft) over substrates consisting of mud or silty sand.

There is almost no published information on the biology of this species.

== Taxonomy ==
Epinephelus heniochus was first formally described in 1904 by the American ichthyologist Henry Weed Fowler (1878–1965), with the type locality given as Padang on Sumatra.
