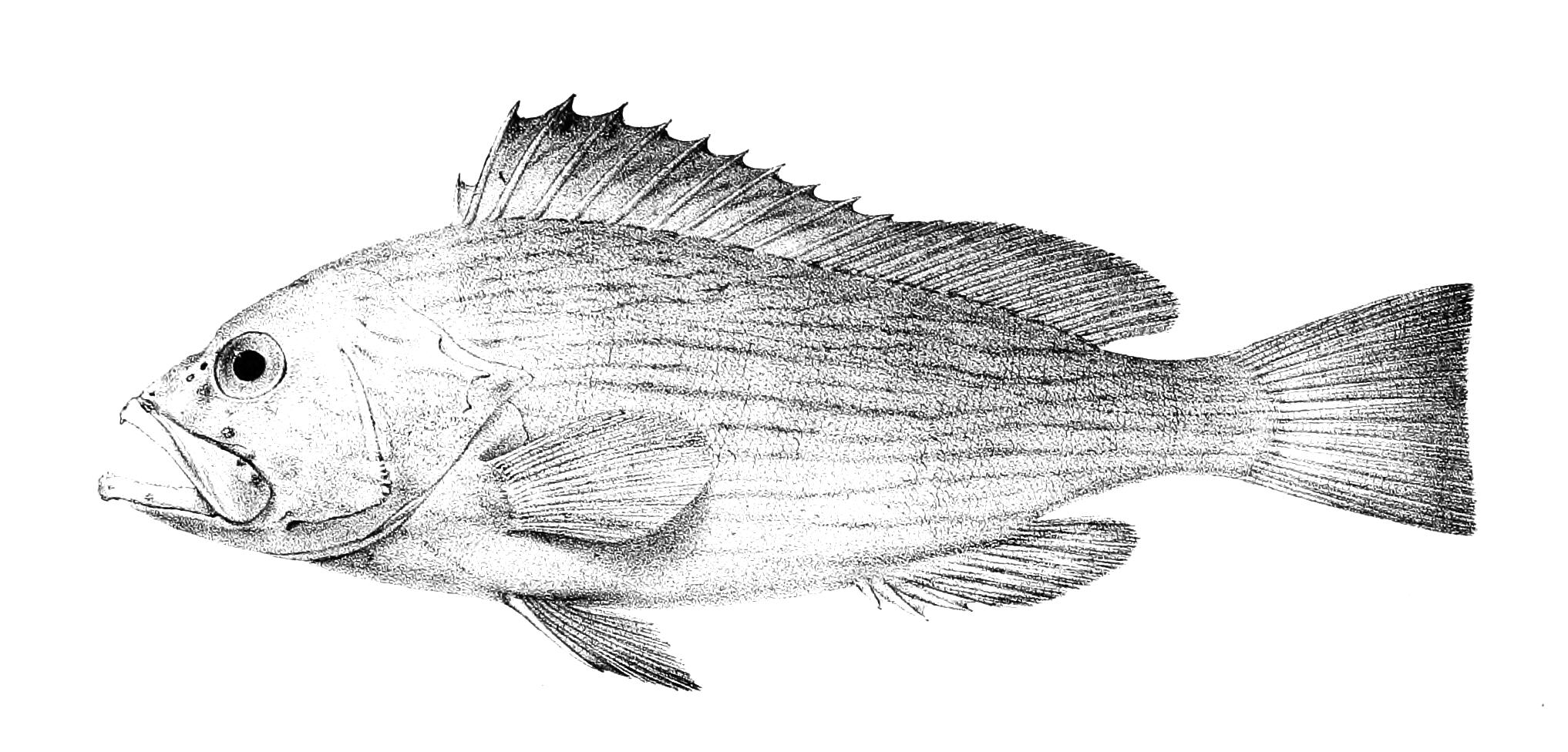

Conservation status
- Least Concern (IUCN 3.1)

Scientific classification
- Kingdom: Animalia
- Phylum: Chordata
- Class: Actinopterygii
- Order: Perciformes
- Suborder: Percoidei
- Family: Epinephelidae
- Genus: Epinephelus
- Species: E. undulosus

Binomial name
- Epinephelus undulosus (Quoy & Gaimard, 1824)

Synonyms
- Bodianus undulosus Quoy and Gaimard, 1824; Cephalopholis undulosus (Quoy and Gaimard, 1824); Serranus amboinensis Bleeker, 1852; Serranus lineatus Valenciennes, 1828

= Epinephelus undulosus =

Wavy-lined grouper

Species of fish

Epinephelus undulosus, the wavy-lined grouper, brown-lined reefcod, mid-water rockcod, mid-water grouper, is a species of marine ray-finned fish, a grouper from the subfamily Epinephelinae which is part of the family Serranidae, which also includes the anthias and sea basses. It has a wide Indo-Pacific distribution. They are produced through aquaculture and commercially fished.

== Description ==
Epinephelus undulosus has a standard length which is 2.7 to 3.1 times its depth. It has a convex region between the eyes. The preopercle is angular with an incision just above its angle and there are enlarged serrations at the angle while the gill cover has a straight or slightly concave upper margin. There are 11 spines and 17-19 soft rays in the dorsal fin and 3 spines and 8 rays in the anal fin. The membranes between the dorsal fin spines are not notched. The caudal fin is truncate or emarginate. The overall colour of the head, body, and fins purplish grey to brownish grey, marked with brown to golden-brown spots on the head and wavy horizontal brown or golden brown lines on the upper body, although these may be indistinct on larger fish. The margin of the spiny part of the dorsal fin has a thin line of blackish colouration. This species attains a total length of 120 centimetres (47 in), although they are more commonly around 45 centimetres (18 in), and a maximum weight of 6.4 kilograms (14 lb).

== Distribution ==
Epinephelus undulosus is found in the Indian and Pacific Oceans from the coasts of Somalia and Kenya, the Gulf of Aden and Socotra east to southern India and Sri Lanka and on to the Pacific Ocean where it extends to the Solomon Islands in the east and Taiwan ion the north. This species has not been recorded from the Red Sea, the Persian Gulf or Australia.

== Habitat and ecology ==
Epinephelus undulosus is found on open muddy seabeds, where it hides in holes in the mud or within solid structures, shipwrecks or debris. It is also found in banks. The adults live at depths from around 25 to 90 metres (82 to 295 ft) while juveniles may be found in water as shallow as 5 metres (16 ft) on coral reefs. It is a generalist predator preying on a variety of benthic fishes and crustaceans. It will also take macrozooplankton, such as pelagic tunicates of the genera Thalia and Pyrosoma, if available.

== Taxonomy ==
Epinephelus undulosus was first formally described as Bodianus undulosus in 1824 by the French naval surgeons and naturalists Jean René Constant Quoy (1790–1869) and Joseph Paul Gaimard (1793–1858) with the type locality given as Waigeo in West Papua.

== Utilisation ==
Epinephelus undulosus is fished for by fisheries off Kenya, Sri Lanka and Tamil Nadu.
