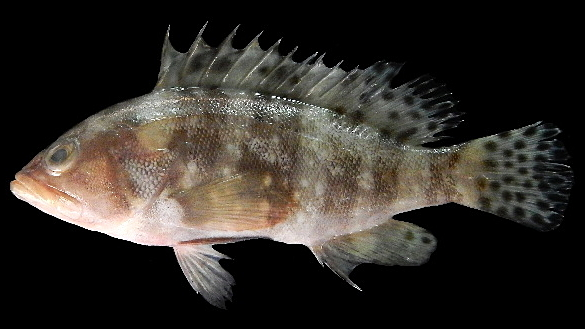

Conservation status
- Least Concern (IUCN 3.1)

Scientific classification
- Kingdom: Animalia
- Phylum: Chordata
- Class: Actinopterygii
- Order: Perciformes
- Family: Epinephelidae
- Genus: Epinephelus
- Species: E. sexfasciatus

Binomial name
- Epinephelus sexfasciatus (Valenciennes, 1828)

Synonyms
- Serranus sexfasciatus Valenciennes, 1828; Cephalopholis sexfasciatus (Valenciennes, 1828)

= Epinephelus sexfasciatus =

Species of fish

Epinephelus sexfasciatus, the sixbar grouper, sixbar rockcod or six-banded rockcod, is a species of marine ray-finned fish, a grouper from the subfamily Epinephelinae which is part of the family Serranidae, which also includes the anthias and sea basses. It is found in the Indo-Pacific region.

== Description ==
Epinephelus sexfasciatus has a body with a standard length which is 2.7 to 3.2 times its depth. The dorsal profile of the head is convex and the intraorbital region is flat or slightly convex. The preopercle has 2 to 4 very enlarged serrations at its angle. The upper edge of the operculum is straight. The dorsal fin contains 11 spines and 14-16 soft rays while the anal fin has 3 spines and 8 soft rays. The membranes between the spines in the dorsal fin are deeply incised. The caudal fin is rounded. The colour of the head and body is light-greyish brown with 5 dark brown vertical bars on the body and 1 on the nape, There may be a scattering of pale spots on the body and some there may also be indistinct small brown spots on the margins of the dark bars. The soft rayed part of the dorsal fin, the caudal fin and the pelvic fin are dusky grey while the pectoral fins are greyish or orange-red. In some specimens the jaws and lower parts of the head are pale reddish brown. The maximum recorded total length is 40 centimetres (16 in).

== Distribution ==
Epinephelus sexfasciatus is found in the Ondo-West Pacific Region from Thailand in the west through the Malay Archipelago as far east as Papua New Guinea and the Philippines, north to Taiwan and south to Australia.

== Habitat and biology ==
Epinephelus sexfasciatus is found on silty or muddy bottoms down to depths of 80 metres (260 ft). The species has a diet made up of small fishes and crustaceans.

== Taxonomy ==
Epinephelus sexfasciatus was first formally described in 1828 as Serranus sexfasciatus by the French zoologist Achille Valenciennes (1794-1865) with the type locality given as Java. It is closely related to Epinephelus diacanthus.

== Utilisation ==
Epinephelus sexfasciatus is a small species of grouper but despite this it is targeted by fisheries and appears in markets in many parts of its range. It does appear in the aquarium trade.
