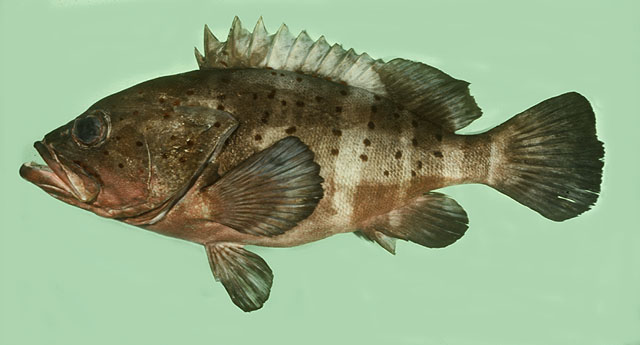

Conservation status
- Least Concern (IUCN 3.1)

Scientific classification
- Kingdom: Animalia
- Phylum: Chordata
- Class: Actinopterygii
- Order: Perciformes
- Family: Epinephelidae
- Genus: Epinephelus
- Species: E. amblycephalus

Binomial name
- Epinephelus amblycephalus (Bleeker, 1857)

Synonyms
- Serranus amblycephalus Bleeker, 1857

= Epinephelus amblycephalus =

Species of fish

The banded grouper (Epinephelus amblycephalus), also known as the blunt-headed rock cod, the bighead grouper, white-spotted green grouper, and yellow-lipped rock-cod, is a species of marine ray-finned fish, a grouper from the subfamily Epinephelinae which is part of the family Serranidae, which also includes the anthias and sea basses. It comes from the western Pacific Ocean.

== Description ==
Epinephelus amblycephalus has a standard length which is around 2.5 to 3 times of its depth. The preopercle has enlarged serrations at the angle and is slightly convex. The overall colour is light grey with dark brown bars. The species reaches 50 cm (19.7 inches) in total length.

== Distribution and habitat ==
Epinephelus amblycephalus is found in the western part of the Pacific Ocean, namely in the Andaman Sea south to Japan, Taiwan, China, the Philippines, Vietnam, Malaysia, Thailand, Indonesia, and New Guinea and the Arafura Sea northwest to Australia and Fiji. The fish is a reef-associated species that occurs in depths ranging from 265 feet (81 m) to 425 feet (130 m).

== Taxonomy ==
The fish was first formally described as Serranus amblycephalus (later Epinephelus amblycephalus) by Pieter Bleeker in 1857, based on a single specimen from Ambon Island in Indonesia.

== Utilisation ==
Epinephelus amblycephalus is caught by fisheries and sold fresh, notably in Hong Kong.
