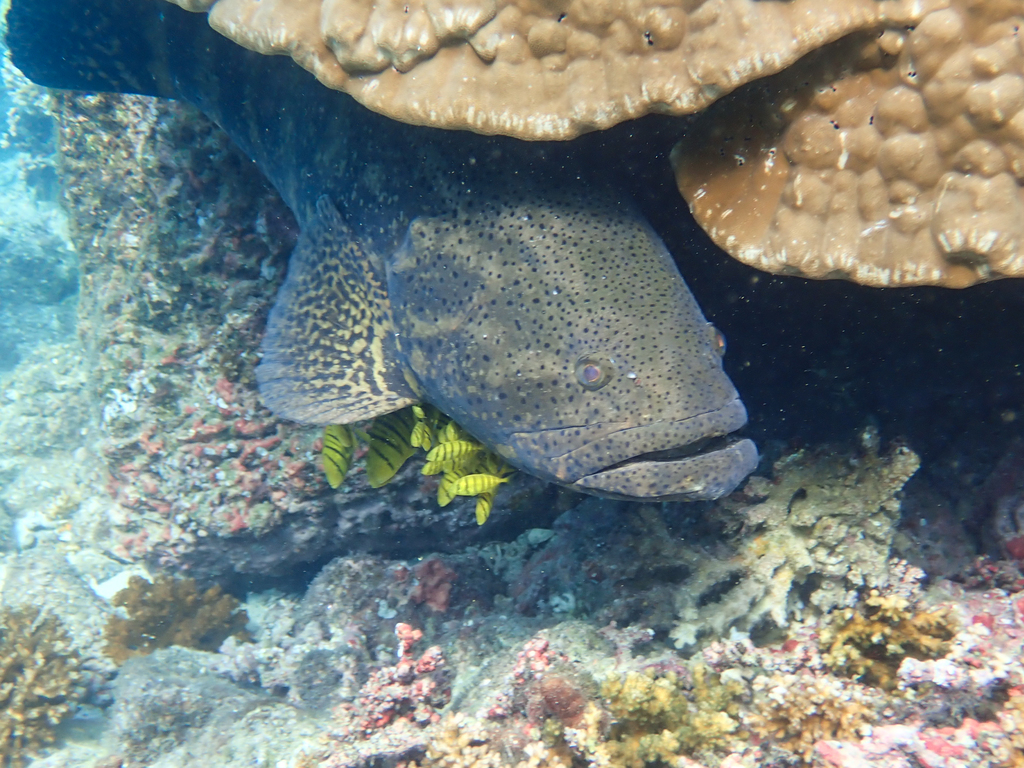

Conservation status
- Data Deficient (IUCN 3.1)

Scientific classification
- Kingdom: Animalia
- Phylum: Chordata
- Class: Actinopterygii
- Division: Teleostei
- Order: Perciformes
- Family: Epinephelidae
- Genus: Epinephelus
- Species: E. quinquefasciatus

Binomial name
- Epinephelus quinquefasciatus (Bocourt, 1868)

Synonyms
- Serranus quinquefasciatus Bocourt, 1868

= Pacific goliath grouper =

Species of fish

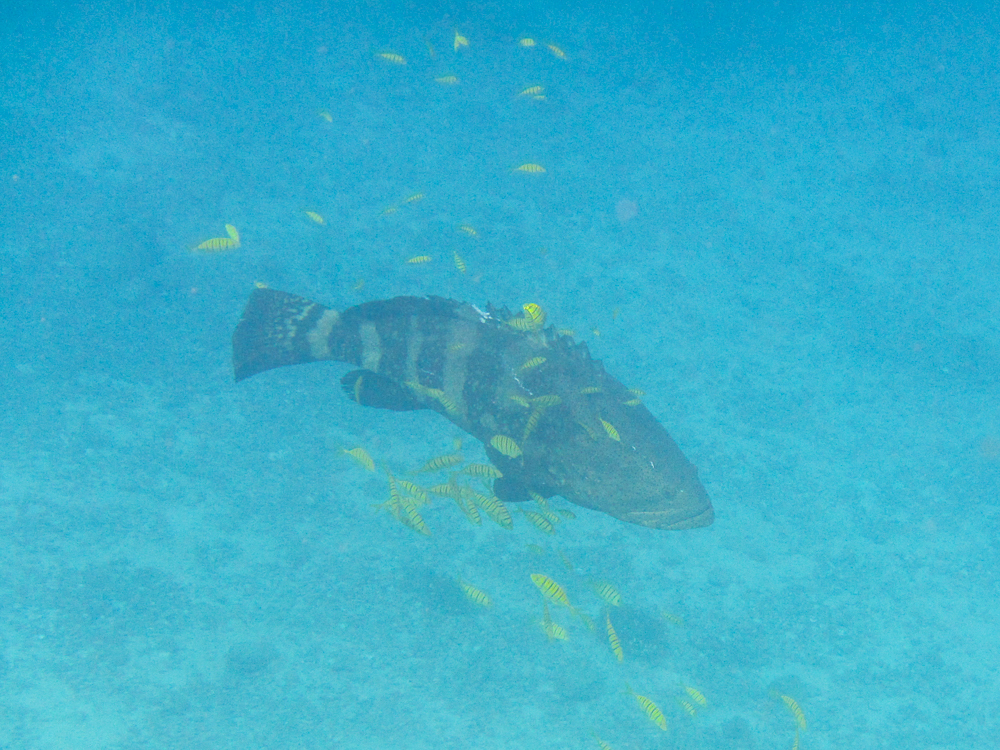
Pacific goliath grouper Coiba N.P. Isla Cocos Sur, Panama

The Pacific goliath grouper (Epinephelus quinquefasciatus), also known as the Pacific itajara grouper, is a species of marine ray-finned fish, a grouper from the subfamily Epinephelinae which is part of the family Serranidae, which also includes the anthias and sea basses. It is found in the eastern Pacific Ocean where it is associated with reefs. It is related to the Atlantic goliath grouper.

== Description ==
The Pacific goliath grouper has a robust, oblong body. The area between the eyes is wide and flat. The margin of the preopercle has fine serrations and an angled edge. The dorsal fin contains 11 spines and 15–16 soft rays while the anal fin has three spines and eight soft rays. The caudal fin is rounded. The head and body are grey or greenish in colour marked with pale blotches and small dark spots which are scattered over the upper head and body, as well as being on the pectoral fins. Subadult fish which are less than 100 centimetres (39 in) in length are overall greenish to tawny brown in colour with diagonal, irregular darker brown bars on the body and caudal fin. The juveniles have heavy spotting on the head, the soft-rayed part of the dorsal fin and the pectoral, pelvic, and caudal fins, They have five diagonal black bars on the body which reach onto the dorsal and anal fins and there is a black bar on base of the caudal fin. This is one of the largest species of grouper, attaining a maximum total length of 250 centimetres (98 in).

== Distribution ==
The Pacific goliath grouper is found in the Eastern Pacific Ocean off the west coasts of the Americas. It is found from the Gulf of California and the Pacific coast of Baja California north to Peru. Its range also includes the islands groups of Revillagigedos in Mexico, Cocos Island in Costa Rica and Malpelo Island in Colombia.

== Habitat and biology ==
The Pacific goliath grouper is found on offshore rocky reefs as adults, although it has also been recorded in inshore areas. The juveniles inhabit mangroves, estuaries, lagoons and bays. It has been recorded feeding on sharks, rays, crustaceans, cephalopods, other fishes and even sea snakes and mammals. Little is known about its biology but it is thought to be similar to the Atlantic goliath grouper.

== Taxonomy ==
The Pacific goliath grouper was first formally described as Serranus quinquefasciatus in 1868 by the French zoologist and artist Marie Firmin Bocourt (1819–1904) with the type locality given as the mouth of Río Nahualate on the Pacific coast of Guatemala. Felipe Poey assigned the giant and goliath groupers (Epinephelus itajara and E. quinquefasciatus, which was then regarded as a synonym of E. itajara) to the genus Promicrops but in 1972 this was designated as a subgenus of Epinephelus. However, these species are still each other's closest relatives.

== Utilisation ==
The Pacific goliath grouper is a sought after quarry species for recreational and commercial fisheries in the entirety of its range. It has declined over much of its range, and, in Colombia, smaller goliath groupers of lengths less than 30 centimetres (12 in) are regarded as the most valuable. This leads fishermen to target small and sexually immature groupers which threatens the local survival of the species by taking the fish before they get an opportunity to reproduce.
