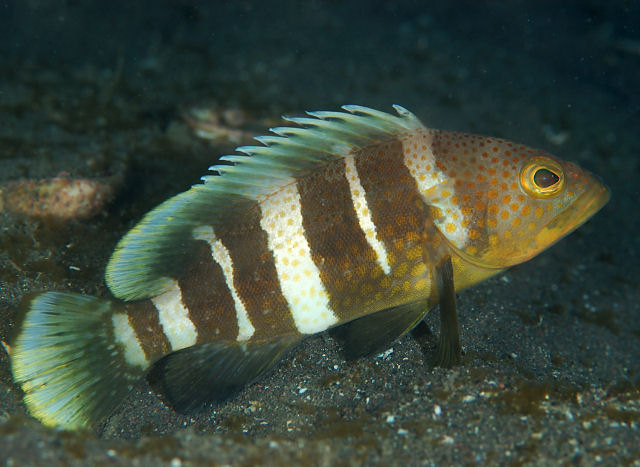

Conservation status
- Data Deficient (IUCN 3.1)

Scientific classification
- Kingdom: Animalia
- Phylum: Chordata
- Class: Actinopterygii
- Order: Perciformes
- Suborder: Percoidei
- Family: Epinephelidae
- Genus: Epinephelus
- Species: E. awoara

Binomial name
- Epinephelus awoara (Temminck & Schlegel, 1842)

Synonyms
- Serranus awoara Temminck & Schlegel, 1842

= Yellow grouper =

Species of fish

The yellow grouper (Epinephelus awoara), also known as the banded grouper, is a species of marine ray-finned fish, a grouper from the subfamily Epinephelinae which is part of the family Serranidae, which also includes the anthias and sea basses. It is found in eastern Asian waters of the Western Pacific Ocean. Its natural habitats are shallow seas and rocky reefs.

== Description ==
The yellow grouper has a body with a standard length which is 2.7 to 3.3 times greater than its depth. The dorsal profile of the head is convex between its eyes, and overall it is notably convex. The preopercle has an angle of less than 90° and there are 2-5 robust spines at the angle. The dorsal fin contains 11 spines and 15-16 soft rays while the anal fin has 3 spines and 8 soft rays. The membranes between the dorsal fin spines are deeply incised. The pectoral fins are longer than the pelvic fins and the caudal fin is convex. The head and body are pale greyish brown on the upperparts and are normally golden yellow on the underparts, There are 4 wide dark bars on the upper portion of the body with one on the caudal peduncle and sometimes there is another showing on the nape. The head and body are marked with many small yellow spots. The fins are marked small greyish white spots while the soft rayed part of the dorsal fin and the caudal fin, as well as occasionally the anal fin, have a prominent yellow margin. The pectoral and pelvic fins are dusky yellow and there is a yellow moustache along the maxillary groove. The maximum published total length recorded for this species is 60 centimetres (24 in) but a length of around 30 centimetres (12 in) is more common.

== Distribution ==
The yellow grouper is found in the western Pacific Ocean from southern Japan and Korea to Vietnam, including the South China Sea, East China Sea, Paracel Islands, Taiwan and the Sea of Japan.

== Habitat and biology ==
The yellow grouper occurs over rock areas as well as over areas of sandy substrate, it can also ben found on coral reefs. Juveniles are found in tidal pools. The adults are found at depths of 10 to 50 metres (33 to 164 ft). It is an aggressive species which frequently chases and bites other fishes, especially those of its own species. It is a predatory species which preys on crustaceans such as shrimp and crabs, as well as fish and cephalopods. The yellow grouper is a protogynous hermaphrodite and, in Hong Kong, spawning takes place from February and March through to May, in Taiwan these fish spawn in June and July, while in Zhejiang, China from May to July.

== Taxonomy ==
The yellow grouper was first formally described as Serranus awoara in 1842 by the Dutch zoologist Coenraad Jacob Temminck (1778-1858) and his student, the German ichthyologist Hermann Schlegel (1804-1884), with the type locality given as Nagasaki.

== Utilisation ==
The yellow grouper is a species of high economic value as a food fish and is caught with trawls and hook and line. It is grown in aquaculture but this appears to be reliant on wild caught fry. In some countries it is used as an ornamental fish due to the attractive colours it shows. Female yellow groupers have been crossed with male Epinephelus tukula using artificial insemination to produce hybrids which have characteristics more desirable for aquaculture.
