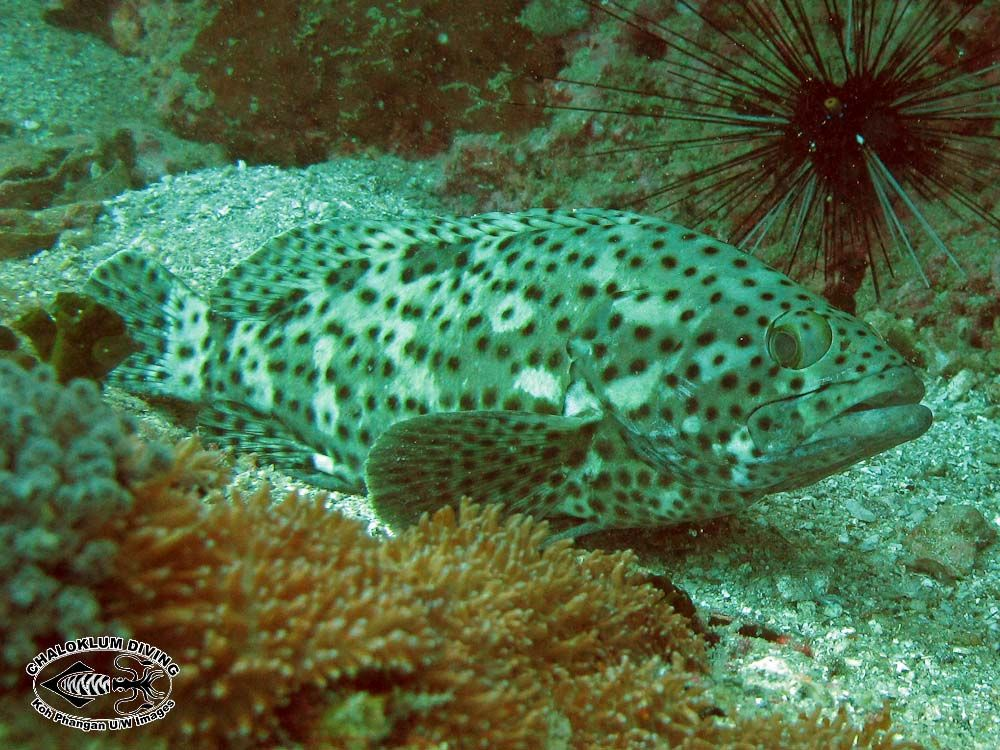

Conservation status
- Least Concern (IUCN 3.1)

Scientific classification
- Kingdom: Animalia
- Phylum: Chordata
- Class: Actinopterygii
- Division: Teleostei
- Order: Perciformes
- Family: Epinephelidae
- Genus: Epinephelus
- Species: E. corallicola

Binomial name
- Epinephelus corallicola (Valenciennes, 1828)

Synonyms
- Serranus corallicola Valenciennes, 1828; Serranus altivelioides Bleeker, 1849

= Epinephelus corallicola =

Species of fish

Epinephelus corallicola, also known as the black-dotted cod, coral cod, coral rockcod, coral grouper, or duskyfin grouper, is a species of marine ray-finned fish, a grouper from the subfamily Epinephelinae which is part of the family Serranidae, which also includes the anthias and sea basses. It has an Indo-Pacific distribution and is found in marine and brackish waters.

== Description ==
Epinephelus corallicola has a body which has a standard length that is 2.7 to 3.2 times its depth. The dorsal profile of the head is almost straight and the area between the eyes is flat. The preopercle is rounded with fine serrations and a slight notch. The upper edge of the gill is complex. The dorsal fin contains 11 spines and 15-17 soft rays while the anal fin has 3 spines and 8 soft rays. The membranes between the dorsal fin spines are slightly incised. The caudal fin is rounded. There are 53–63 scales in the lateral line. This is a light bluish-grey to greyish-green grouper with blotches resembling saddles along its back while the fins and body are marked more or less evenly distributed dark spots, as well as an irregular pattern of paler blotches. The maximum published total length is 49 centimetres (19 in).

== Distribution ==
Epinephelus corallicola has an eastern Indo-Pacific distribution. It is found from Thailand east through Indonesia and the Philippines to Australia, Micronesia and Palau. It is rarely recorded off northern New Caledonia. In Australia it is found from Ningaloo Reef in Western Australia, along the tropical northern coasts of the continent to northern New South Wales.

== Habitat and biology ==
Epinephelus corallicola is found in a variety of habitats from silty shallow reefs to clear waters on the outer reef slopes, at depths between 1 and 30 metres (3.3 and 98.4 ft). It is some times found in estuaries. The biology of this species has been little studied.

== Taxonomy ==
Epinephelus corallicola was first formally described as Serranus corallicola in 1828 by the French zoologist Achille Valenciennes (1794–1865) with the type locality given as Java.

== Utilisation ==
Epinephelus corallicola is not considered as valuable a food fish as related species. However, it is fished for by artisanal and subsistence fisheries throughout its range and is taken to be "grown on" in the live sea food market.
