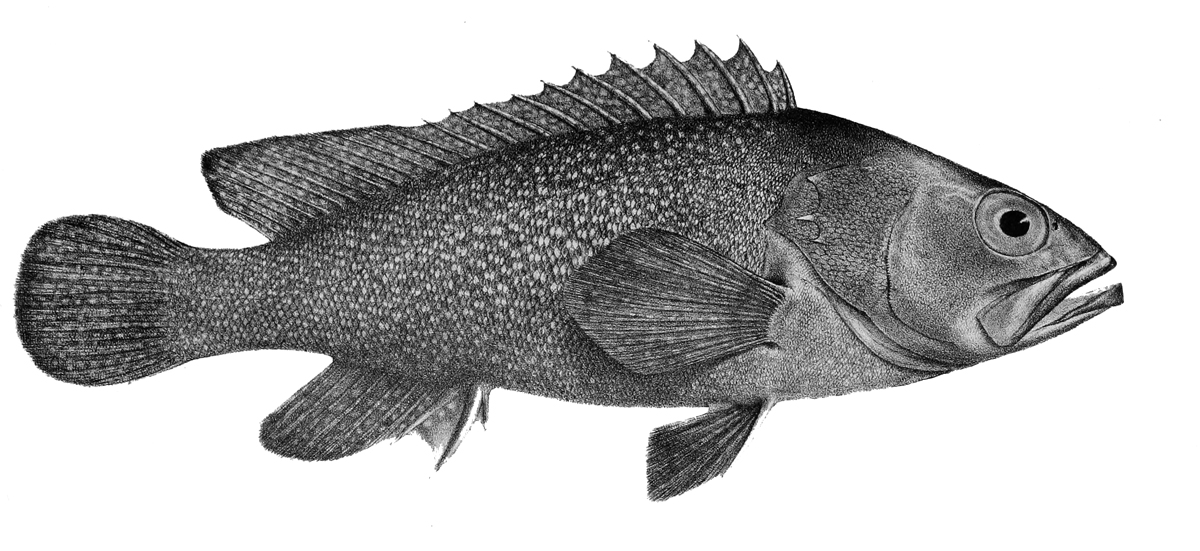

Conservation status
- Least Concern (IUCN 3.1)

Scientific classification
- Kingdom: Animalia
- Phylum: Chordata
- Class: Actinopterygii
- Division: Teleostei
- Order: Perciformes
- Family: Epinephelidae
- Genus: Epinephelus
- Species: E. summana

Binomial name
- Epinephelus summana (Forsskål, 1775)

Synonyms
- Perca summana Forsskål, 1775; Serranus leucostigma Valenciennes, 1828; Sebastes meleagris Peters, 1864; Serranus summana (Forsskål, 1775)

= Epinephelus summana =

Species of fish

Epinephelus summana, the summan grouper, is a species of marine ray-finned fish, a grouper from the subfamily Epinephelinae which is part of the family Serranidae, which also includes the anthias and sea basses. It comes from the Eastern Indian Ocean that occasionally makes its way into the aquarium trade.

== Description ==
Epinephelus summana has a standard length which is 2.7 to 3.1 times its depth. It has a flat or slightly concave region between the eyes. The preopercle has slightly enlarged serrations at its corner and the gill cover has a highly convex upper margin. There are 11 spines and 14–16 soft rays in the dorsal fin and 3 spines and 8–9 rays in the anal fin. The membranes between the dorsal fin spines are notched. The caudal fin is rounded. The overall colour is dark olive-brown to dark brownish grey with large pale blotches, the majority being greater in size than the eyes, and abundant small white spots which lie over this pattern. The fins are covered with small white spots, apart for the pectoral fins where they are restricted to its base. This species attains a maximum standard length of 52 centimetres (20 in).

== Distribution ==
Epinephelus summana is found in the western part of the Indian Ocean. It is found in the Red Sea, the Gulf of Aden and off Socotra.

== Habitat and ecology ==
Epinephelus summana is a reef-associated species that occurs in shallow protected coral reefs and in shallow lagoons and seaward reef slopes (1 to 30 m) or brackish-water environments. No published information on the biology of this species has been found.

== Taxonomy ==
Epinephelus summanawas first formally described as Perca summana in 1775 by the Finnish explorer Peter Forsskål (1732–1763) with the type locality given as the Red Sea.

== Utilisation ==
Epinephelus summana is caught by small, local fisheries and has been recorded in fish markets in Egypt and Sudan. It also sometimes appears in the aquarium trade.
