= List of marine Perciform fishes of South Africa =

Sub-list of the List of marine bony fishes of South Africa for perch-like fishes

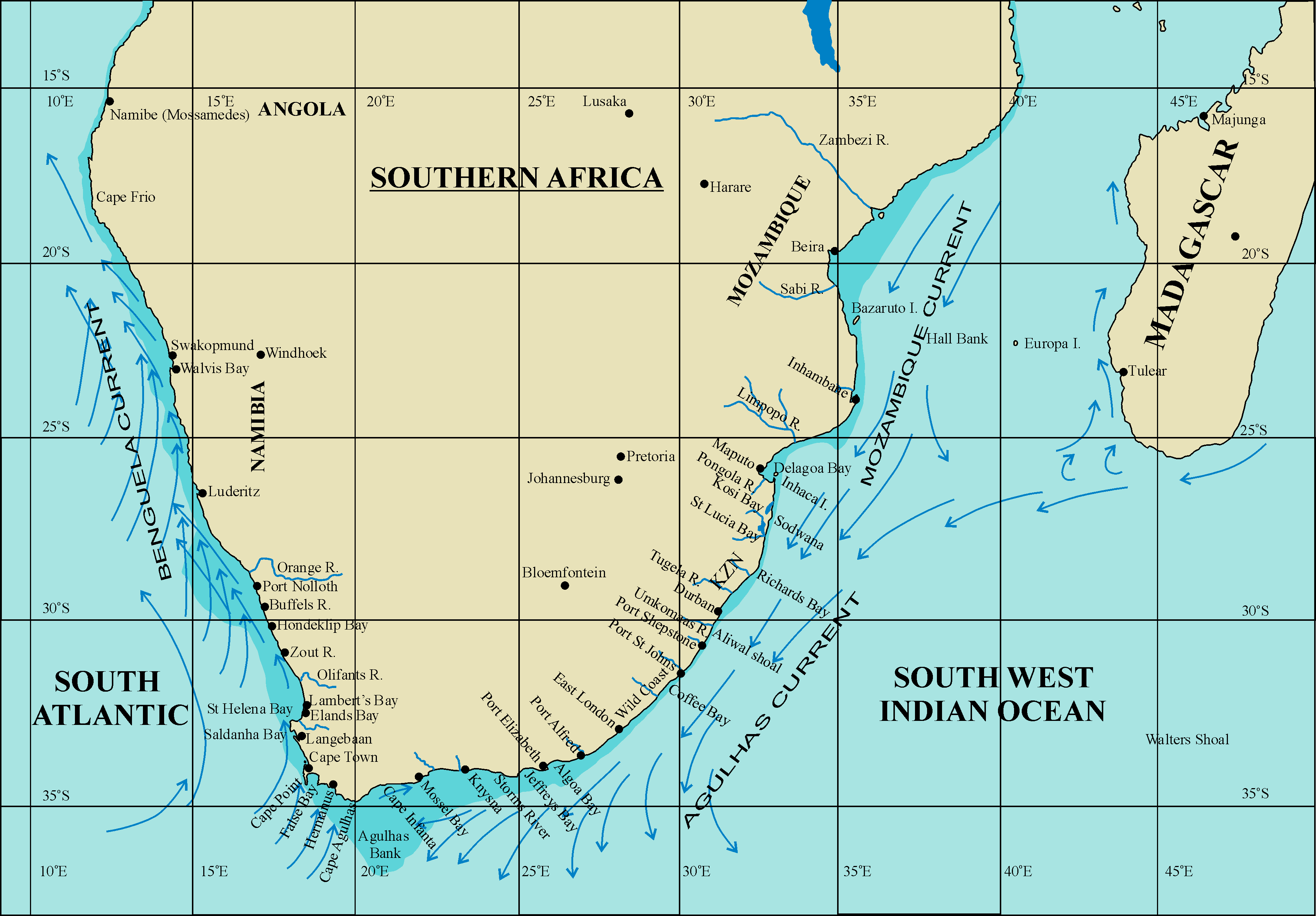
Map of the Southern African coastline showing some of the landmarks referred to in species range statements

This is a sub-list of the List of marine bony fishes of South Africa for perch-like fishes recorded from the oceans bordering South Africa. This list comprises locally used common names, currently accepted scientific names with author citation and recorded ranges. Ranges specified may not be the entire known range for the species, but should include the known range within the waters surrounding the Republic of South Africa. Internationally used common names may also be present where useful.

List ordering and taxonomy complies where possible with the current usage in the World Register of Marine Species (WoRMS), and may differ from the cited source, as listed citations are primarily for range or existence of records for the region. Sub-taxa within any given taxon are arranged alphabetically as a general rule. Synonyms should be listed where useful.

Perciformes (/ˈpɜːrsɪˌfɔːrmiːz/), is an order of ray-finned fish in the clade Percomorpha. Perciformes means "perch-like". Among the well-known members of this group are perches and darters (Percidae), and also sea basses (Serranidae). This order contains many familiar freshwater temperate and tropical marine fish groups, but also extremophiles that have successfully colonized both the North and South Poles, as well as the deepest depths of the ocean. (Full article...)

== Suborder Cottoidei ==
Family: Psychrolutidae — Fatheads

- Cottunculus spinosus Gilchrist, 1906 (off Cape Point)
- Ebinania costaecanariae (Cervigon, 1961) (off north western South Africa)
- Psychrolutes inermis (Vaillant, 1888) (off western South Africa)
- Psychrolutes macrocephalus (Gilchrist, 1904) (known only from South Africa)

Family: Liparidae — Snailfishes

- Careproctus albescens Barnard, 1927 (off Cape Point)
- Paraliparis australis Gilchrist, 1902 (off Cape Point)
- Paraliparis copei Goode & Bean, 1896 (Northwest Atlantic, Azores and South Africa. off Cape Point)
- Barnard's dwarf snailfish, Psednos micrurus Barnard, 1927, recorded as syn. Paraliparis micrurus (Barnard, 1927) (Cape of Good Hope, southern Indian Ocean and South Pacific)

== Suborder Percophoidei ==
Family: Percophidae — Duckbills

- Bembrops platyrhynchus (Alcock, 1894) (off Natal)
- Pteropsaron heemstrai Nelson, 1982 (2 specimens off southern Natal)
- Pteropsaron natalensis (Nelson, 1982), recorded as syn. Osopsaron natalensis Nelson, 1982 (3 specimens off Kosi Bay)

== Suborder Scorpaenoidei ==
Family: Apistidae

- Bearded waspfish Apistus carinatus (Bloch & Schneider, 1801) (Natal northwards, coastal areas of Indo-West Pacific)

Family: Aploactinidae — Velvetfishes

- Roughskin scorpionfish Cocotropus monacanthus (Gilchrist, 1906) (4 specimens from off Natal)
- Crested scorpionfish Ptarmus jubatus (Smith, 1935) (Natal coast north to Porto Amelia, Mozambique)

Family: Bembridae

- African deepwater flathead Parabembras robinsoni Regan, 1921 (Durban to southern Mozambique)

Family: Congiopodidae — Horsefishes

- Spinenose horsefish, Congiopodus spinifer (Smith, 1839) (Walvis Bay to Natal)
- Smooth horsefish, Congiopodus torvus (Gronow, 1772) (Namibia to Pondoland)

Family: Hoplichthyidae — Spiny flatheads

- Spiny flathead Hoplichthys acanthopleurus Regan, 1908 (off Natal)

Family: Peristediidae — Armoured gurnards

- Peristedion weberi Smith, 1934 (Northern Natal to Somalia)
- Satyrichthys laticeps (Schlegel, 1852) recorded as syn. Satyrichthys adeni (Lloyd, 1907) (Mossel Bay to Delagoa Bay)
- Scalicus investigatoris (Alcock, 1898), recorded as syn. Satyrichthys investigatoris (Alcock, 1898) (off Durban)

Family: Platycephalidae — Flatheads

- Crocodile flathead, Cociella crocodilus (Cuvier, 1829), recorded as syn. Cociella crocodila (Tilesius, 1812) (Durban northwards and from the Red Sea to Japan and Guadalcanal)
- Spotfin flathead Cociella sp. (East London north to Madagascar and Oman)
- Thorny flathead, Sorsogona portuguesa (Smith, 1953), recorded as syn. Grammoplites portuguesus (Smith, 1953) (Durban to Beira)
- Large-scale flathead Onigocia oligolepis (Regan, 1908) (three specimens known from Natal)
- Madagascar flathead, tentacled flathead Papilloculiceps longiceps (Ehrenberg, 1829) (Widespread from Durban north to the Red Sea)
- Bartail flathead, Platycephalus indicus (Linnaeus, 1758) (Cape Agulhas to Mozambique)(Widespread from Mossel bay northward to the Red Sea, and Japan and Australia)
- Sand flathead, Sunagocia arenicola (Schultz, 1966), recorded as syn, Thysanophrys arenicola Schultz, 1966 (Natal north to Seychelles; Chagos archipelago; Indonesia, Australia, Philippines and Marshall Islands)
- Quarterspined flathead Thysanophrys celebica (Bleeker, 1854) (Durban north to Zanzibar)
- Longsnout flathead Thysanophrys chiltonae Schultz, 1966 (the Red Sea and Indo-West Pacific from northern Natal to Australia)
- Fringelip flathead, Sunagocia otaitensis (Cuvier, 1829), recorded as syn. Thysanophrys otaitensis (Cuvier, 1829) (Natal north to Seychelles, and throughout tropical Indo-Pacific).

Family: Scorpaenidae

Subfamily: Caracanthinae — Coral crouchers

- Spotted croucher Caracanthus madagascariensis (Guichenot, 1869) (Tropical western and central Indian ocean, south to Sodwana Bay)
- Coral croucher Caracanthus unipinna (Gray, 1831) (Tropical waters throughout Indo-Pacific; reaches Sodwana bay)

Subfamily: Choradactylinae

- Threestick stingfish Choridactylus natalensis (Gilchrist, 1902) (Durban to Mozambique)

Subfamily: Minoinae

- Onestick stingfish Minous coccineus Alcock, 1890 (Durban, northwards; also in the Red Sea, Arabian sea and eastwards to gulf of Thailand)

Subfamily: Pteroinae

- Shortfin turkeyfish Dendrochirus brachypterus (Cuvier, 1829) (Transkei north to the Red Sea and east to central Pacific)
- Zebra turkeyfish Dendrochirus zebra (Cuvier, 1829) (off Durban; northwards to the Red Sea and eastwards to central Pacific)
- Blackfoot firefish Parapterois heterura (Bleeker, 1856) (Natal and northwards across Indian ocean to western Pacific)
- Broadbarred firefish Pterois antennata (Bloch, 1787) (KwaZulu-Natal northwards and to central Pacific)
- Devil Firefish Pterois miles (Bennett, 1828) (Port Elizabeth northwards)(Port Alfred northwards to the Red Sea and eastern Indian ocean)
- Deepwater firefish Pterois mombasae (Smith, 1957) (off Durban, Sri Lanka and New Guinea)
- Radial firefish, clearfin lionfish, Pterois radiata Cuvier, 1829 (KwaZulu-Natal to Mozambique)(Sodwana Bay northwards and to central Pacific)
- Plaintail firefish Pterois russelii Bennett, 1831 (Kwa-Zulu-Natal northward and to western Pacific)

Subfamily: Scorpaeninae

- Decoy scorpionfish Iracundus signifer Jordan and Evermann, 1903 (one taken off Sodwana Bay)
- Spotfin scorpionfish, Neoscorpaena nielseni (Smith, 1964), recorded as syn. Neomerinthe nielseni (Smith, 1964) (several specimens from off Durban)
- Ocellated scorpionfish Parascorpaena mcadamsi (Fowler, 1938) (Sodwana Bay, Zululand, and Mozambique to Pacific)
- Golden scorpionfish Parascorpaena mossambica (Peters, 1855) (Xora and Sodwana Bay northwards, east Africa to central Pacific)
- Phenacoscorpius adenensis Norman, 1939 (near Buffalo River)
- Speckled deepwater scorpionfish Pontinus leda Eschmeyer, 1969 (off west coast from gulf of Guinea to 18°45'S)
- Blacklash scorpionfish Pontinus nigerimum Eschmeyer, 1983 (one specimen off Natal)
- Popeyed scorpionfish Rhinopias frondosa (Günther, 1891) (Durban north along African coast and east to Japan and Caroline Islands)
- Bigscale scorpionfish Scorpaena scrofa Linnaeus, 1758 (Algoa bay to Natal)
- Guam scorpionfish Scorpaenodes guamensis Quoy and Gaimard, 1824 (Transkei northwards and throughout Indo-West Pacific)
- Hairy scorpionfish Scorpaenodes hirsutus (Smith, 1957) (Sodwana Bay northwards, scattered localities in Indo-West Pacific to Hawaii and Tahiti)
- Dwarf scorpionfish Scorpaenodes kelloggi (Jenkins, 1903) (Sodwana bay and scattered localities in Indo-Pacific, east to Hawaii and Tahiti)
- Cheekspot scorpionfish, Scorpaenodes evides (Jordan & Thompson, 1914), recorded as syn. Scorpaenodes littoralis (Tanaka, 1917) (a few specimens from deep reefs off Natal; also scattered localities in Indo-West Pacific)
- Coral scorpionfish Scorpaenodes parvipinnis (Garrett, 1863) (Durban northwards; widespread on coral reefs throughout Indo-West Pacific)
- Blotchfin scorpionfish Scorpaenodes varipinnis Smith, 1957 (Sodwana bay and northwards in western Indian Ocean)
- Bigmouth scorpionfish Scorpaenopsis brevifrons Eschmeyer and Randall, 1975 (Sodwana bay northward; also at scattered localities in the Indo-Pacific)
- False stonefish Scorpaenopsis diabolus Cuvier, 1829 (Xora northwards, widespread in Indo-West Pacific.)
- Humpbacked scorpionfish, Scorpaenopsis gibbosa Bloch and Schneider, 1801 (Transkei northwards, Indian Ocean and the Red Sea)
- Gilchrist's scorpionfish Scorpaenopsis gilchristi (Smith, 1957) (1 specimen off Tugela river)
- Smallscale scorpionfish Scorpaenopsis oxycephalus Bleeker, 1849 (Sodwana Bay and scattered localities in the Indo-Pacific)
- Spinycrown scorpionfish, Poss's scorpionfish, Scorpaenopsis possi Randall & Eschmeyer, 2001, (Sodwana Bay northwards, throughout Indo-Pacific))
- Raggy scorpionfish Scorpaenopsis venosa (Cuvier, 1829) (Durban northwards and scattered localities in Indo-Pacific)
- Yellowspotted scorpionfish Sebastapistes cyanostigma (Bleeker, 1856) (Port Alfred northwards to the Red Sea and east to the central Pacific)
- Spineblotch scorpionfish Sebastapistes mauritiana (Cuvier, 1829) (Transkei northwards, scattered Indo-Pacific localities)
- Barchin scorpionfish Sebastapistes strongia (Cuvier, 1829) (Transkei northwards, widespread in Indo-Pacific)
- Darkspotted scorpionfish Sebastapistes tinkhami (Fowler, 1946) (Sodwana bay, western and south Pacific)
- Paperfish ir Leaf scorpionfish Taenianotus triacanthus Lacépède, 1802 (Durban northwards and to central Pacific)

Family: Sebastidae

- Jacopever Helicolenus dactylopterus (Delaroche, 1809) (Walvis Bay to Natal)
- False jacopever Sebastes capensis (Gmelin, 1788) (Cape to Saldanha Bay)
- Cape scorpionfish, Trachyscorpia eschmeyeri Whitley, 1970, recorded as syn. Trachyscorpia capensis (Cape to St Helena Bay)

Family: Setarchidae

- Channelled rockfish, Setarches guentheri Johnson, 1862 (Natal, nearly worldwide in warm seas)

Family: Synanceiidae — Stonefish

- Stonefish Synanceia verrucosa Bloch & Schneider, 1801(Red sea and Indo-Pacific south to Durban)

Family: Tetrarogidae — Waspfishes

- Redskinfish Ablabys binotatus (Peters, 1855) (Xora river mouth to Zanzibar)
- Smoothskin scorpionfish, Coccotropsis gymnoderma (Gilchrist, 1906) (Cape to Algoa bay)

Family: Triglidae — Gurnards

- Cape gurnard, Chelidonichthys capensis (Cuvier, 1829) (Cape Fria to Maputo)
- Bluefin gurnard, Chelidonichthys kumu (Cuvier, 1829) (Cape Point to Delagoa Bay)
- African gurnard, streaked gurnard, Chelidonichthys lastoviza (Bonnaterre, 1788), recorded as syn. Trigloporus lastoviza (Bonnaterre, 1788) and Trigloporus lastoviza africanus (Smith, 1934), (St. Sebastian Bay to Port Alfred)
- Lesser gurnard, Chelidonichthys queketti (Regan, 1904) (Table bay to Natal)
- Prickly gurnard Lepidotrigla faurei (Gilchrist & Thompson, 1914) (Durban northwards to India)
- Spiny gurnard Lepidotrigla multispinosa Smith, 1934 (Natal to Kenya)

== Suborder Serranoidei ==
Family: Serranidae — Rockcods (groupers) and seabasses

Subfamily: Anthiadinae

- Gorgeous swallowtail, Meganthias natalensis (Fowler, 1925), recorded as syn. Holanthias natalensis (Fowler, 1925) (East London to Madagascar and Reunion)
- Threadfin goldie Nemanthias carberryi Smith, 1954 (Western Indian ocean south to Natal)
- Checked swallowtail, Odontanthias borbonius (Valenciennes, 1828), recorded as syn. Holanthias borbonius (Valenciennes, 1828) (1 specimen off Durban, Mauritius, Reunion, Comores, Madagascar and Japan)
- Silverspots Plectranthias longimanus (Weber, 1913) (Natal to Kenya)
- Flagfin Plectranthias morgansi (Smith, 1961) (Five specimens off Kenya and 3 off South Africa)
- Redblotch basslet Plectranthias winniensis (Tyler, 1966) Western Indian ocean to Natal)
- Harlequin goldie, Pseudanthias connelli (Heemstra & Randall, 1986), recorded as syn. Anthias connelli Heemstra and Randall, 1986 (off Brighton Beach south of Durban Harbour)
- Silver streak goldie, Pseudanthias cooperi (Regan, 1902), recorded as syn. Anthias cooperi Regan, 1902, (Natal coast and across Indian ocean to Japan and east coast of Australia)
- Sea goldie Pseudanthias squamipinnis (Peters, 1855), also recorded as syn. Anthias squamipinnis, (Port Elizabeth to Mozambique)

Subfamily: Epinephelinae

- Goldribbon soapfish, Aulacocephalus temminckii Bleeker, 1854 (Indo-Pacific south to Durban)
- Peacock rockcod Cephalopholis argus Schneider, 1801 (Durban to the Red Sea)
- Golden rockcod Cephalopholis aurantia (Valenciennes, 1828) (Mauritius, Reunion, Seychelles, east and southern Africa south to Durban)
- Coral rockcod, coral grouper, Cephalopholis miniata (Forsskål, 1775) (Central KwaZulu-Natal to the Red Sea)
- Duskyfin rockcod Cephalopholis nigripinnis (Valenciennes, 1828) (Indian Ocean south to Natal)
- Tomato rockcod Cephalopholis sonnerati (Valenciennes, 1828) (Indian Ocean south to Durban)
- Smooth rockcod, smooth grouper, Dermatolepis striolata (Playfair 1867) (Durban to Oman)
- White-edged rockcod Epinephelus albomarginatus Boulenger, 1903 (East London to southern Mozambique)
- Catface rockcod Epinephelus andersoni Boulenger, 1903 (Mossel Bay to southern Mozambique)
- Squaretail rockcod, areolate grouper, Epinephelus areolatus (Forsskål, 1775) (Natal to the Red Sea)
- Whitespotted rockcod, whitespotted grouper, Epinephelus coeruleopunctatus (Bloch, 1790), (Indian Ocean south to Natal)
- Moustache rockcod Epinephelus chabaudi Castelnau, 1861 (Algoa Bay to Kenya)
- Brownspotted rockcod, brownspotted grouper, Epinephelus chlorostigma (Valenciennes. 1828) (Natal to the Red Sea)
- Redbarred rockcod, blacktip grouper, Epinephelus fasciatus (Forsskål, 1775) (Port Alfred to the Red Sea)
- Bigspot rockcod Epinephelus faveatus (Valenciennes, 1828) (Indian Ocean to Natal)
- Yellowtail rockcod Epinephelus flavocaeruleus (Lacepède, 1802) (Port Alfred to Kenya)
- Brindlebass, giant grouper, Epinephelus lanceolatus (Bloch, 1790) (Tropical Indo-Pacific south to Algoa Bay)
- Streakyspot rockcod Epinephelus longispinis (Kner, 1865) (Indian ocean, Transkei to Indonesia)
- Yellowbelly rockcod Epinephelus marginatus (Lowe, 1834) (Namibia to Mozambique) Formerly identified as Epinephelus guaza (Linnaeus, 1758)
- Speckled rockcod Epinephelus magniscuttis Postel, Fourmanoir & Guézé, 1963 (Sodwana Bay, Mozambique, Mauritius and Reunion)
- Malabar rockcod, malabar grouper, Epinephelus malabaricus (Schneider, 1801) (Transkei to the Red Sea)
- One-blotch rockcod Epinephelus melanostigma (Schultz, 1953) (Indian Ocean south to Durban)
- Honeycomb rockcod, honeycomb grouper, Epinephelus merra Bloch, 1793 (Indo-West Pacific to Transkei)
- Contour rockcod, comet grouper, Epinephelus morrhua (Valenciennes, 1833) (Durban to the Red Sea)
- Dot-dash rockcod Epinephelus poecilonotus (Temminck & Schlegel, 1842) (Port Alfred to Somalia)
- Tiger rockcod Epinephelus posteli Fourmanoir & Crosnier, 1964 (Natal, Mozambique and Madagascar)
- Oblique banded rockcod Epinephelus radiatus (Day, 1867) (Natal, Mauritius, Reunion, south India, Chagos archipelago, east to southern Japan)
- Halfmoon rockcod Epinephelus rivulatus (Valenciennes, 1830) (Algoa Bay to India)
- Foursaddle rockcod Epinephelus spilotoceps Schultz, 1953 (Natal to Kenya)
- Orangespotted rockcod, Epinephelus coioides (Hamilton, 1822), recorded as syn. Epinephelus suillus (Valenciennes, 1828), (Natal to Persian Gulf)
- Greasy rockcod, greasy grouper, Epinephelus tauvina (Forsskål, 1775), (Red Sea to Natal)
- Potato bass, potato grouper, Epinephelus tukula Morgans, 1959 (Indo-West Pacific from Central KwaZulu-Natal to Japan and Australia)
- Yellow-edged lyretail or Swallowtail rockcod Variola louti (Forsskål, 1775) (Central KwaZulu-Natal to Mozambique)

Subfamily: Grammistinae — Soapfishes and Podges

- Blotched podge Aporops bilinearis Schultz, 1943, also recorded as syn. Aporops allfreei Smith, 1953, (Sodwana Bay to Kenya)
- Arrowhead soapfish, Belonoperca chabanaudi Fowler & Bean, 1930 (Central Pacific to east Africa, south to Natal)
- Sixstripe soapfish goldenstriped soapfish, Grammistes sexlineatus (Thunberg, 1792) (East London to the Red Sea)
- Honeycomb podge Pseudogramma polyacantha (Bleeker, 1856) (Indo-Pacific south to Sodwana Bay)

Subfamily: Serraninae

- Koester Acanthistius sebastoides (Castelnau, 1861) (Namibia to Mozambique)
- Comber, Serranus cabrilla (Linnaeus, 1758) also reported as Serranus knysnaensis (Gilchrist 1904) (Endemic(?), False Bay to Durban)

== Suborder Uranoscopoidei ==
Family: Ammodytidae — Sandlances

- Scaly sandlance, Ammodytoides renniei (Smith, 1957), recorded as syn. Bleekeria renniei Smith, 1857, (Known only from East London to Port Alfred and the Seychelles)
- Cape sandlance Gymnammodytes capensis (Barnard, 1927) (Angola to Delagoa Bay)

Family: Pinguipedidae — Sandsmelts

- Blacktail sandsmelt Parapercis hexophtalma (Cuvier, 1829) (Red Sea to Durban)
- Deepwater sandsmelt Parapercis maritzi Anderson, 1992 (Natal and Transkei)
- Spotted sandsmelt Parapercis punctulata (Cuvier, 1829) (Northern Natal)
- Smallscale sandsmelt Parapercis robinsoni Fowler, 1929 (Persian Gulf to Algoa Bay)
- Rosy sandsmelt Parapercis schauinslandii (Steindachner, 1900) (Hawaii, Seychelles, Comores, and Durban)
- Blotchlip sandsmelt Parapercis xanthozona Bleeker, 1849 (Indo-West Pacific, 2 specimens from Natal)

Family: Uranoscopidae — Stargazers

- Spotted stargazer, scaly stargazer, Pleuroscopus pseudodorsalis Barnard, 1927 (off Table Bay and Algoa Bay)
- Stargazer Uranoscopus archionema Regan, 1921 (Mossel Bay to Kenya)

== Suborder Zoarcoidei ==
Family: Zoarcidae — Eelpouts

- Lycodes terraenovae Collett, 1896, recorded as syn. Lycodes agulhensis Andriashev, 1959 (Cap Blanc, Mauretania to Agulhas Bank)
- Lycodonus vermiformis Barnard, 1927 (off Cape Point)
- Limp eelpout, Melanostigma gelatinosum Günther, 1881 (off Cape Town)
