= Cociella martingomoni =

Scientific classification
- Kingdom: Animalia
- Phylum: Chordata
- Class: Actinopterygii
- Order: Perciformes
- Family: Platycephalidae
- Genus: Cociella
- Species: C. martingomoni

Binomial name
- Cociella martingomoni Imamura & Aungtonya, 2020

Species of fish

Cociella martingomoni is a species of marine ray-finned fish belonging to the family Platycephalidae, the flatheads. It is found in the Andaman Sea.

== Taxonomy ==
Cociella martingomoni was first formally described in 2020 by Hisashi Imamura and Charatsee Aungtonya with its type locality given as the Andaman Sea to the south of Phuket. The name of this species honours the Australian ichthyologist Dr. Martin F. Gomon, the senior curator of fishes at the Museum of Victoria in recognition of his contribution to ichthyology.

== Description ==
Cociella martingomoni has 8 spines in the first dorsal fin with an additional very small separate spine to the front of it while the second dorsal fin has 11 soft rays, as does the anal fin. It has a large head with between 4 and 7 suborbital spines. This species has a high number of pectoral fin rays in comparison to its congeners, other than the brownmargin flathead (C. hutchinsi), with 21 to 23. The head and body are covered in numerous small brownish spots and there may or may not be brown spots on the upper caudal fin. The standard lengths of the type and paratypes varies from 149.8 to 160.4 mm (5.90 to 6.31 in).

== Distribution ==
Cociella martingomoni has only been recorded from the eastern Indian Ocean in the Andaman Sea.
