= Parascorpaena moultoni =

Coral perch

Conservation status
- Least Concern (IUCN 3.1)

Scientific classification
- Kingdom: Animalia
- Phylum: Chordata
- Class: Actinopterygii
- Order: Perciformes
- Family: Scorpaenidae
- Genus: Parascorpaena
- Species: P. moultoni

Binomial name
- Parascorpaena moultoni Whitley, 1961

Species of fish native to the Western Central Pacific

Parascorpaena moultoni, the coral perch, is a species of marine ray-finned fish belonging to the family Scorpaenidae, the scorpionfishes. They are native to the Western Central Pacific, and are particularly common in the Coral Sea and the East China Sea.

== Description ==
The coral perch has been described as resembling the ocellate scorpionfish Parascorpaena mcadamsi to the point of being regarded as a junior synonym thereof. The primary differentiating feature of the coral perch is its two sub-orbital spines (as opposed to the ocellate scorpionfish which has three).
