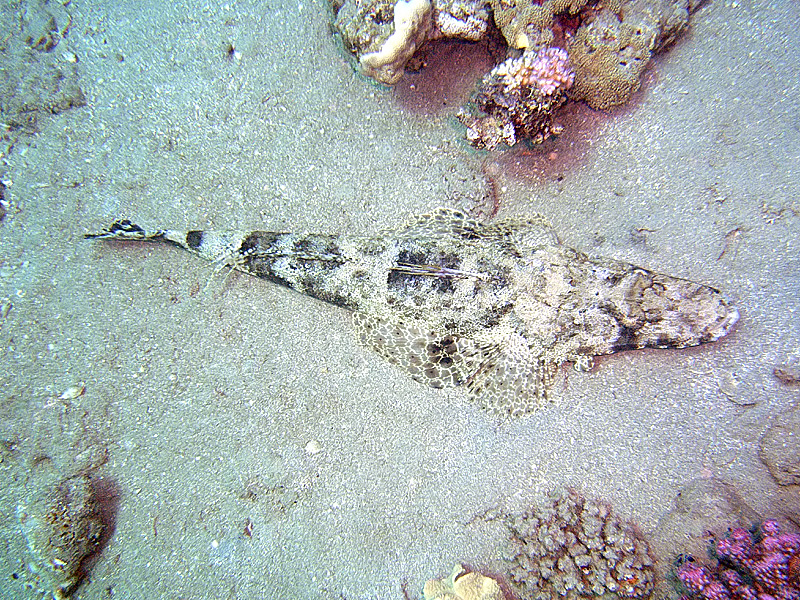

Conservation status
- Least Concern (IUCN 3.1)

Scientific classification
- Kingdom: Animalia
- Phylum: Chordata
- Class: Actinopterygii
- Order: Perciformes
- Family: Platycephalidae
- Genus: Cociella
- Species: C. punctata

Binomial name
- Cociella punctata (Cuvier, 1829)

Synonyms
- Platycephalus punctatus Cuvier, 1829; Platycephalus malabaricus Cuvier, 1829; Platycephalus quoyi Bleeker, 1856; Platycephalus fasciatus Günther, 1872; Suggrundus hunti Fowler, 1937; Grammoplites jacksoni Fowler, 1944

= Spotted flathead =

Species of fish

The spotted flathead (Cociella punctata) is a species of marine ray-finned fish belonging to the family Platycephalidae, the flatheads. It is found in the Indo-Pacific.

== Taxonomy ==
The spotted flathead was first formally described in 1829 as Platycephalus punctatus with its type localities given as Trincomalee in Sri Lanka, Vanikoro in the Solomon Islands and Madagascar. This taxon was previously regarded as a junior synonym of the crocodile flathead (C. crocodilus) but was recognised again as a valid species in 1996. The specific name punctata, means "spotted", a reference to the small dark reddish brown spots on the head and flanks when preserved in alcohol.

== Description ==
The spotted flathead has 9 spines in the first dorsal fin and 10-12 soft rays on the second dorsal fin with 11 - 12 soft rays in the anal fin. The highest spine on the preoperculum only extends to around half-way to the margin of the operculum. There is a spine on the preorbital and the infraorbital ridge is typically smooth over the front half of the eye. The suborbital ridge has no spines to the rear of the eye. There is an interopercular flap and the Iris lappet simple and semicircular. There are many small dark spots on back extending to downward past the lateral line, these are less dense to the rear. There are 5-6 dark bands across the back, but in small juveniles there may only be a wide saddle running across the first dorsal fin and a slender saddle near the rear of the second dorsal fin. This species has a maximum published total length of 35 cm (14 in) although a total length of 25 cm (9.8 in) is more typical.

== Distribution and habitat ==
The spotted flathead is found in the Indo-Pacific region. Its range extends from South Africa to the Red Sea east to Vanuatu, north to Taiwan and south to Papua New Guinea. It is replaced by the crocodile flathead in the northwestern Pacific and by the brownmargin flathead (C. hutchinsi) in Australia. This species is commonly recorded in shallow coastal waters sitting on the seabed at depths between 10 and 300 m (33 and 984 ft). The juveniles use mangroves and stream mouths as nursery grounds while the adults prefer silty areas.

== Fisheries ==
The spotted flathead is targeted by commercial fisheries but at a small scale.
