= Cociella heemstrai =

Conservation status
- Least Concern (IUCN 3.1)

Scientific classification
- Kingdom: Animalia
- Phylum: Chordata
- Class: Actinopterygii
- Order: Perciformes
- Family: Platycephalidae
- Genus: Cociella
- Species: C. heemstrai

Binomial name
- Cociella heemstrai Knapp, 1996

Species of fish

Cociella heemstrai is a species of demersal, marine ray-finned fish belonging to the family Platycephalidae, the flatheads. It is found in the western Indian Ocean off eastern Africa and Madagascar. Little is known about its biology but it is caught by fisheries.

== Taxonomy ==
Cociella heemstrai was first formally described in 1996 by Leslie William Knapp with the type locality given as Kenya. These fishes were previously regarded as a population of the crocodile flathead (C. crocodilus) but were recognised as a valid species in 1996.

== Etymology ==
The specific name honours the American-South African ichthyologist Philip C. Heemstra of the South African Institute for Aquatic Biodiversity in recognition of his assistance to Knapp's studies of flatheads.

== Description ==
Cociella heemstrai is one of the species of Cociella which has 12 soft rays in the first dorsal fin and in the anal fin and have between 9 and 11 gill rakers on the first gill arch. There is a vivid yellow bar in the centre of the caudal fin, dark bands over the back and 4 or 5 paired white spots on the upper body. This species reaches a maximum size of 17.1 cm (6.7 in).

== Distribution and habitat ==
Cociella heemstrai is found in the western Indian Ocean from Kenya in the north south to Durban in KwaZulu-Natal as well as being found in Madagascar. This is a demersal fish which can be found down to depths of 280 m (920 ft).

== Biology ==
Cociella heemstrai is abundant but little is known about its population, life history and ecology.

== Fisheries ==
Cociella heemstrai is commonly caught in trawls and when using seine nets in shallow estuaries.
