= Cociella somaliensis =

Conservation status
- Least Concern (IUCN 3.1)

Scientific classification
- Kingdom: Animalia
- Phylum: Chordata
- Class: Actinopterygii
- Order: Perciformes
- Family: Platycephalidae
- Genus: Cociella
- Species: C. somaliensis

Binomial name
- Cociella somaliensis Knapp, 1996

Species of fish

Cociella somaliensis is a species of demersal, marine ray-finned fish belonging to the family Platycephalidae, the flatheads. It is found in the northwestern Indian Ocean.

== Taxonomy ==
Cociella somaliensis was first formally described in 1996 by Leslie William Knapp with the type locality given as south of Ras Hafun in Somalia. These fishes were previously regarded as a population of the crocodile flathead (C. crocodilus) but were recognised as a valid species in 1996, although this species was only tentatively assigned to the genus Cociella. The specific name somaliensis refers to the type locality.

== Description ==
Cociella somaliensis has 8 spines in the first dorsal fin with an additional very small separate spine to the front of it while the second dorsal fin has 12 soft rays, while the anal fin may have between 11 and 13 soft rays but typically has 12. The pectoral fins have 19-22 rays. In the lateral line the pored scales at the front end have spines. The types and paratypes ranged in standard length between 199 and 290 mm (7.8 and 11.4 in). The upper body is pale tan in colour, marked with a scattering of small dark spots. The first dorsal fin is dusky marked with large dark spots while the second is also marked with large dark spots but on a pale background. The paired fins are dusky while the caudal fin is marked with spots and bars.

== Distribution and habitat ==
Cociella somaliensis is found in the north western Indian Ocean where it has been recorded off Somalia and off southern Oman at depths between 30 and 49 m (98 and 161 ft) and its habitat appears to be muddy or sandy seabeds.
