= Cod Hole =

Dive site in Queensland, Australia

- Location within Queensland
- Location: Queensland
- Nearest city: Cooktown
- Coordinates: 14°39′51″S 145°39′49″E

Cod Hole is one of the best known dive sites in the world and is located on the northern end of the Great Barrier Reef in Queensland, Australia on ribbon reef number 10. It is notable for and is named after the dozen or so potato cod that live there. The sanctioned feeding of these fish and number of visitors to the site has also made it a focal point in the debate over reef management.

== Potato Cod ==
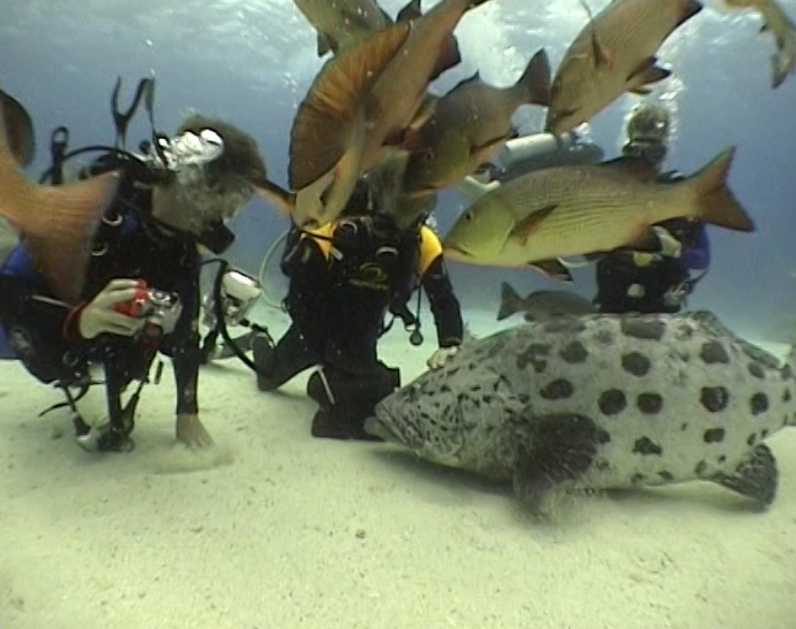
Divers feeding potato cod at Cod Hole.

The potato cod at the site can weigh 6–30 kg, having been fed by divers for the last 20 years [when?] since underwater photographers Ron and Valerie Taylor publicised the site. Their numbers have declined as the site has become more popular, with the average number of potato cod seen per dive almost halving between 1992 and 1998.

== See also ==
- Great Barrier Reef
- Great Barrier Reef Marine Park
