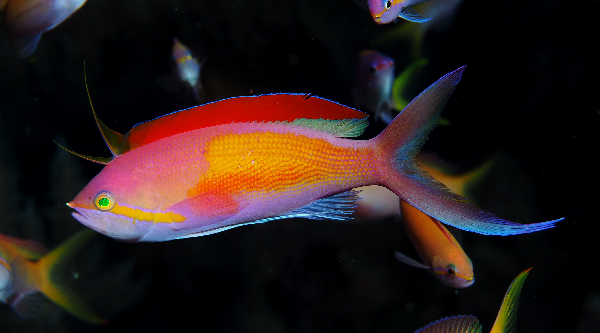
- Nemanthias carberryi

Scientific classification
- Kingdom: Animalia
- Phylum: Chordata
- Class: Actinopterygii
- Order: Perciformes
- Family: Anthiadidae
- Genus: Nemanthias; J. L. B. Smith, 1954

Type species
- Nemanthias carberryi J. L. B. Smith, 1954

= Nemanthias =

Genus of fishes

Nemanthias is a genus of colourful reef fishes of the subfamily Anthiinae, part of the family Serranidae, the groupers and sea basses. They are found in the Indo-Pacific. The species belonging to this genus have a diet consisting of zooplankton, and are haremic.

== Species ==
These are six recognized species in this genus:

- Nemanthias carberryi (J. L. B. Smith, 1954)
- Nemanthias bicolor (Randall, 1979)
- Nemanthias regalis (J. E. Randall & Lubbock, 1981)
- Nemanthias dispar (Herre, 1955) (Peach fairy basslet)
- Nemanthias bartlettorum (J. E. Randall & Lubbock, 1981) (Bartletts' anthias)
- Nemanthias ignitus (J. E. Randall & Lubbock, 1981) (Flame anthias)
