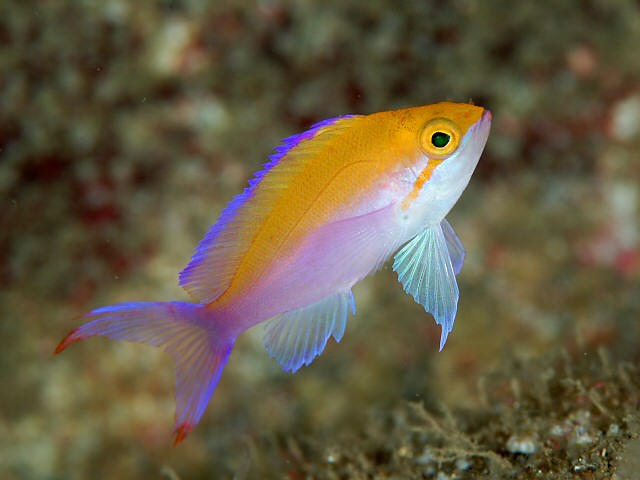

Conservation status
- Least Concern (IUCN 3.1)

Scientific classification
- Kingdom: Animalia
- Phylum: Chordata
- Class: Actinopterygii
- Order: Perciformes
- Family: Anthiadidae
- Genus: Nemanthias
- Species: N. bicolor

Binomial name
- Nemanthias bicolor (Randall, 1979)

Synonyms
- Anthias bicolor Randall, 1979; Mirolabrichthys bicolor (Randall, 1979); Pseudanthias bicolor (Randall, 1979)

= Nemanthias bicolor =

Species of fish

Nemanthias bicolor, the bicolor anthias or yellowback basslet, is a species of marine ray-finned fish in the family Serranidae, the groupers and sea basses. It is from the Indo-Pacific Ocean. It occasionally makes its way into the aquarium trade. It grows to a size of 13 cm in length.

== Description ==
Nemanthias bicolor has a relatively elongated, laterally compressed body which has a standard length which is around three times its depth. It has a moderately large, oblique, terminal mouth, although in males the thickening of the upper lip causes it to be slightly inferior. The maxilla is level with the rear edge of the eye. The dorsal fin has 10 spines and 16-18 soft rays while the anal fin contains 3 spines and 7-8 soft rays. The colouration of this species is sexually dimorphic, the males are more intensely coloured having a violet body with a yellow back, the yellow colour continuing on to the upper lobe of the caudal fin and the dorsal fin has a purple margin.. The females are normally lavender in colour and have a yellow back and caudal fin. The males also have two yellow-tipped filaments at the origin of the dorsal fin which they use when displaying. The maximum total length recorded is 13 centimetres (5.1 in).

== Distribution ==
Nemanthias bicolor has a wide Indo-Pacific distribution from Réunion and Mauritius in the west to Hawaii and the Line Islands, north as far as the Ryukyus south of Japan and south to northeastern Australia.

== Habitat and biology ==
Nemanthias bicolor is a rather uncommon fish which is found in lagoon patch reefs and along outer reef slopes. It can be found in deep coastal reefs to outer reef slopes, in areas where there is a strong current. It feeds on zooplankton. These fish are protogynous hermaphrodites and each social group will contain a dominant male and a number of females and juveniles. When the dominant male dies then the largest female will change sex.

== Taxonomy ==
Nemanthias bicolor was first formally described as Anthias bicolor in 1979 by the American ichthyologist John E. Randall (1924-2020) with the type locality given as Waianae coast off Pokai Bay on Oahu in Hawaii.

== Utilisation ==
Nemanthias bicolor is traded within the aquarium trade.
