= Parascorpaena poseidon =

Scientific classification
- Kingdom: Animalia
- Phylum: Chordata
- Class: Actinopterygii
- Division: Teleostei
- Order: Perciformes
- Family: Scorpaenidae
- Genus: Parascorpaena
- Species: P. poseidon

Binomial name
- Parascorpaena poseidon T. K. Chou and T. Y. Liao. 2022

Species of fish

Parascorpaena poseidon, or Poseidon's scorpionfish, is a species of marine ray-finned fish in the scorpionfish family Scorpaenidae. It is found around Taiwan.

== Description ==
Parascorpaena poseidon reaches a standard length of 12.7 cm (5.0 in).
