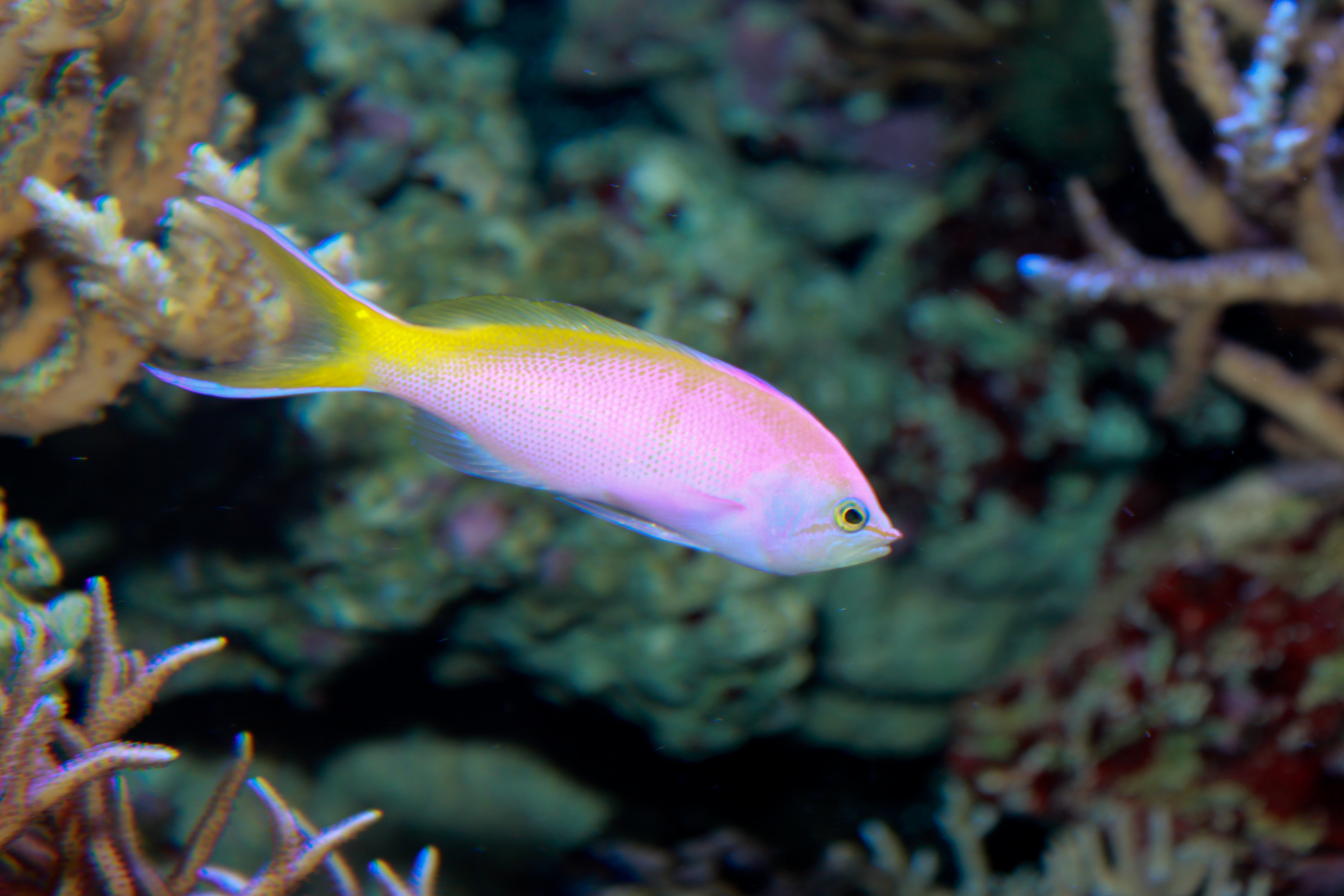

Conservation status
- Least Concern (IUCN 3.1)

Scientific classification
- Kingdom: Animalia
- Phylum: Chordata
- Class: Actinopterygii
- Order: Perciformes
- Family: Anthiadidae
- Genus: Nemanthias
- Species: N. bartlettorum

Binomial name
- Nemanthias bartlettorum (Randall & Lubbock, 1981)

Synonyms
- Anthias bartlettorum Randall & Lubbock, 1981; Pseudanthias bartlettorum (Randall & Lubbock, 1981)

= Nemanthias bartlettorum =

Species of fish

Nemanthias bartlettorum, commonly known as Bartlett's anthias, is a species of marine ray-finned fish in the family Serranidae, the groupers and sea basses. It is found in the Pacific Ocean. This fish is sometimes kept in aquaria.

== Description ==
Nemanthias bartlettorum has a somewhat elongated, moderately compressed body which is around 3 times as long (in standard length as it is deep. The males have a thickened upper lip which is a little pointed and can be moved up and down. It has a moderately large, obliquely angled mouth in which the maxilla extends to the rear edge of the eye. On females the mouth is terminal but the thickening of the upper lip causes the mouth to slightly point downwards. The lateral line is curved and follows the curve of the dorsal profile. The dorsal fin has 10 spines and 17-18 soft rays while the anal fin has 3 spines and 7 soft rays. The upper two fifths of the head and body are bright yellow and the remainder of the body is lavender, fading on the fish's underside. The portion of the head behind the eye is lavender becoming whitish ventrally. There is a dark orange band on the head which runs from the snout to the lower part of the eye before fading behind the eye. The iris is dark orange. The dorsal fin is yellow with the first two spines and the tips of the other spines being lavender and the anal fin is pale lavender with a reddish margin at the front. The caudal fin is yellow, brighter on the lobes with violet outer margins. The pectoral fins are hyaline and the pelvic fins are pale lavender. It grows to a maximum standard length of 9 centimetres (3.5 in).

== Distribution ==
Nemanthias bartlettorum is found in the western Pacific Ocean. It has been recorded from Palau, Kosrae in the Caroline Islands, Kwajalein in the Marshall Islands, Nauru and Tabuaeran in Kiribati as well as from Tonga.

== Habitat and biology ==
Nemanthias bartlettorum is found in large schools consisting of a few males and several dozen females and juveniles. They feed on zooplankton and occur in areas with strong currents such as reef faces, slopes, drop off zones and channels down to depths of 30 metres (98 ft).

== Taxonomy and etymology ==
Nemanthias bartlettorum was first formally described as Anthias bartlettorum in 1981 by John E. Randall and Roger Lubbock with the type locality given as the outer reef off Enubuj Islet at southern end of Kwajalein Atoll in the Marshall Islands. When the genus Anthias was determined to be largely restricted to the Atlantic and Mediterranean the subgenus Mirolabrichtys was renamed Pseudanthias as this name, coined by Pieter Bleeker in 1871 had priority. The specific name honours Nathan and Patricia Bartlett who took the underwater photographs which showed that this species existed.

== Utilisation ==
Nemanthias bartlettorum appears in the aquarium trade.
