= Nemanthias ignitus =

Conservation status
- Least Concern (IUCN 3.1)

Scientific classification
- Kingdom: Animalia
- Phylum: Chordata
- Class: Actinopterygii
- Order: Perciformes
- Family: Anthiadidae
- Genus: Nemanthias
- Species: N. ignitus

Binomial name
- Nemanthias ignitus (Randall & Lubbock, 1981)

Synonyms
- Anthias ignitus Randall & Lubbock, 1981; Pseudanthias ignitus (Randall & Lubbock, 1981)

Species of fish

Nemanthias ignitus, the flame anthias or flame basslet, is a species of marine ray-finned fish in the family Serranidae, the groupers and sea basses. It is found in the Indo-Pacific region.

== Description ==
Nemanthias ignitus has a moderately elongate, compressed body with an oblique, moderately large mouth which, in males, has a swollen upper lip which can be moved up and down and with the maxilla reaching to the level of the rear margin of the eye. The lateral line is smoothly curved and runs parallel to the dorsal profile. The dorsal fin has 10 spines and 16-17 soft rays while the anal fin has 3 spines and 7 soft rays. The head and body of males are orange, reddening towards the back and tinged with lavender towards the belly and abdomen. The bottom part of the head is pale yellow and there is an orange strip with lavender edges which runs from the tip of the snout, through the bottom half of the eye to the edge of the gill cover just in front of the pectoral fin. The iris is orange and lavender below and greenish above. There is a small red spot at the base of the pectoral fin. The dorsal fin is bright red with a purple edge and a yellow base which broadens onto the fin rays. The anal fin is hyaline and its colour is lavender while the caudal fin is orange on the base becoming redder on its lobes. Females are similarly but less intensely coloured. The maximum total length of this species is 9 centimetres (3.5 in).

== Distribution ==
Nemanthias ignites is found in the eastern Indian Ocean and far western Pacific Ocean in the Maldives, the Andaman Islands, Similan Islands in Thailand and around Sumatra.

== Habitat and biology ==
Nemanthias ignitus is found on the outer slopes of reefs where it prefers clear waters at depths of 3 to 15 metres (9.8 to 49.2 ft). It occurs in aggregations. Its diet is dominated by zooplankton feeds several metres above the substrate. When they feel threatened they rapidly retreat to the sanctuary of crevices in the rocks. The males guard harems of several females and when courting their colour intensifies and they erect their red dorsal fins. They are nonandric protogynous hermaphrodites in which all the fish are born female and the largest and most dominant females will change sex to become males.

== Taxonomy ==
Nemanthias ignitus was first formally described as Anthias ignitus by John E. Randall and Roger Lubbock in 1981 with the type locality given as the Lagoon reef of Villingili Island, North Male Atoll in the Maldives. The specific name ignitus refers to the flame colour of this fish's body. Some authorities classify this species within the subgenus Mirolabrichthys.

== Utlisation ==
Nemanthias ignitus is found in the aquarium but it is rare and it is a difficult species to keep as it is timid and, initially, will only accept live food.
