= Parascorpaena bandanensis =

Scientific classification
- Kingdom: Animalia
- Phylum: Chordata
- Class: Actinopterygii
- Order: Perciformes
- Family: Scorpaenidae
- Genus: Parascorpaena
- Species: P. bandanensis

Binomial name
- Parascorpaena bandanensis Bleeker, 1851

Species of scorpionfish

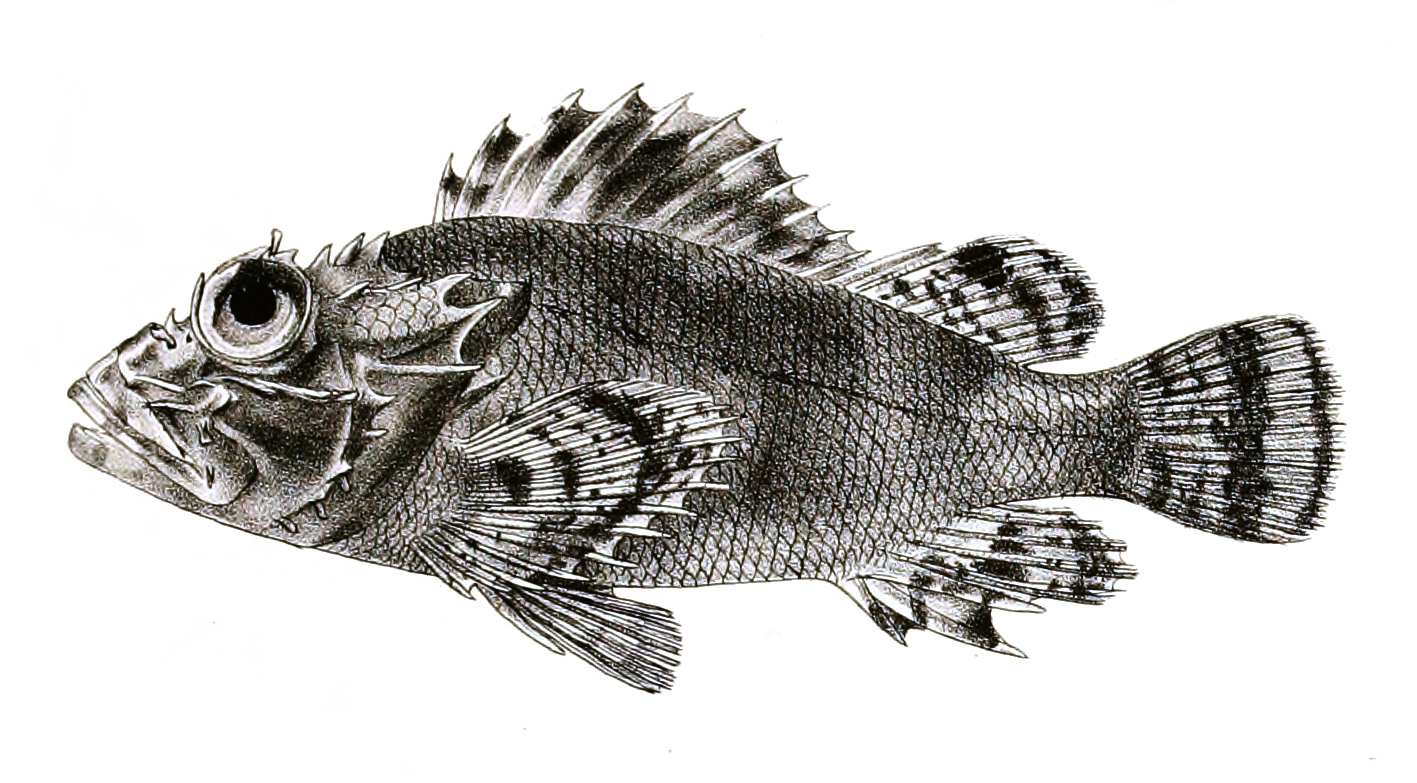
Historical illustration of *Parascorpaena bandanensis* (syn. *Scorpaena haplodactylus*)

Parascorpaena bandanensis, or the Banda scorpionfish, is a species of marine ray-finned fish belonging to the family Scorpaenidae, the scorpionfishes. They are native to the East Indies.

== Description ==
Banda scorpionfish have twelve dorsal spines, nine to ten dorsal soft rays, three anal spines, and five anal soft rays. Their maximum size is about 10.0 cm.

== Behavior ==
Banda scorpionfish primarily dwell in reefs, as well as shallow rubbled estuaries.

== IUCN Status ==
The IUCN still needs to evaluate the banda scorpionfish and, as such, lacks an official IUCN status. Based on the conservation status of other known species of scorpionfish, it is unlikely that the species will be threatened at all. Despite this, reports from the 19th and 20th centuries state the existence of Banda scorpionfish in the waters around Singapore; however, studies conducted in 2011 and 2020 have shown a lack of data suggesting continued habitation. This may suggest a decline in population over the last century, though it is unlikely that the species is facing any significant risk.
