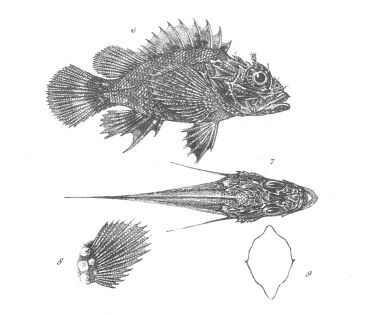
- P. picta from John Lort Stokes' 1846 Discoveries in Australia

Scientific classification
- Kingdom: Animalia
- Phylum: Chordata
- Class: Actinopterygii
- Order: Perciformes
- Family: Scorpaenidae
- Subfamily: Scorpaeninae
- Genus: Parascorpaena; Bleeker, 1876

Type species
- Scorpaena picta Cuvier, 1829

= Parascorpaena =

Genus of fishes

Parascorpaena is a genus of marine ray-finned fish belonging to the family Scorpaenidae, the scorpionfishes. They are native to the Indian Ocean and the western Pacific Ocean.

== Taxonomy ==
Parascorpaena was first formally described as a monotypic genus in 1876 by the Dutch herpetologist and ichthyologist Pieter Bleeker with Cuvier's Scorpaena picta designated as the type species. The genus name Parascorpaena means "like Scorpaena", as the type species was described as being similar to that genus but separated from it by the possession an forwards and downwards pointing posterior lacrimal spine.

== Species ==
There are currently seven recognized species in this genus:

- Parascorpaena aurita (Rüppell, 1838) (Golden scorpionfish)
- Parascorpaena bandanensis (Bleeker, 1851) (Banda scorpionfish)
- Parascorpaena maculipinnis J. L. B. Smith, 1957
- Parascorpaena mcadamsi (Fowler, 1938) (McAdam's scorpionfish)

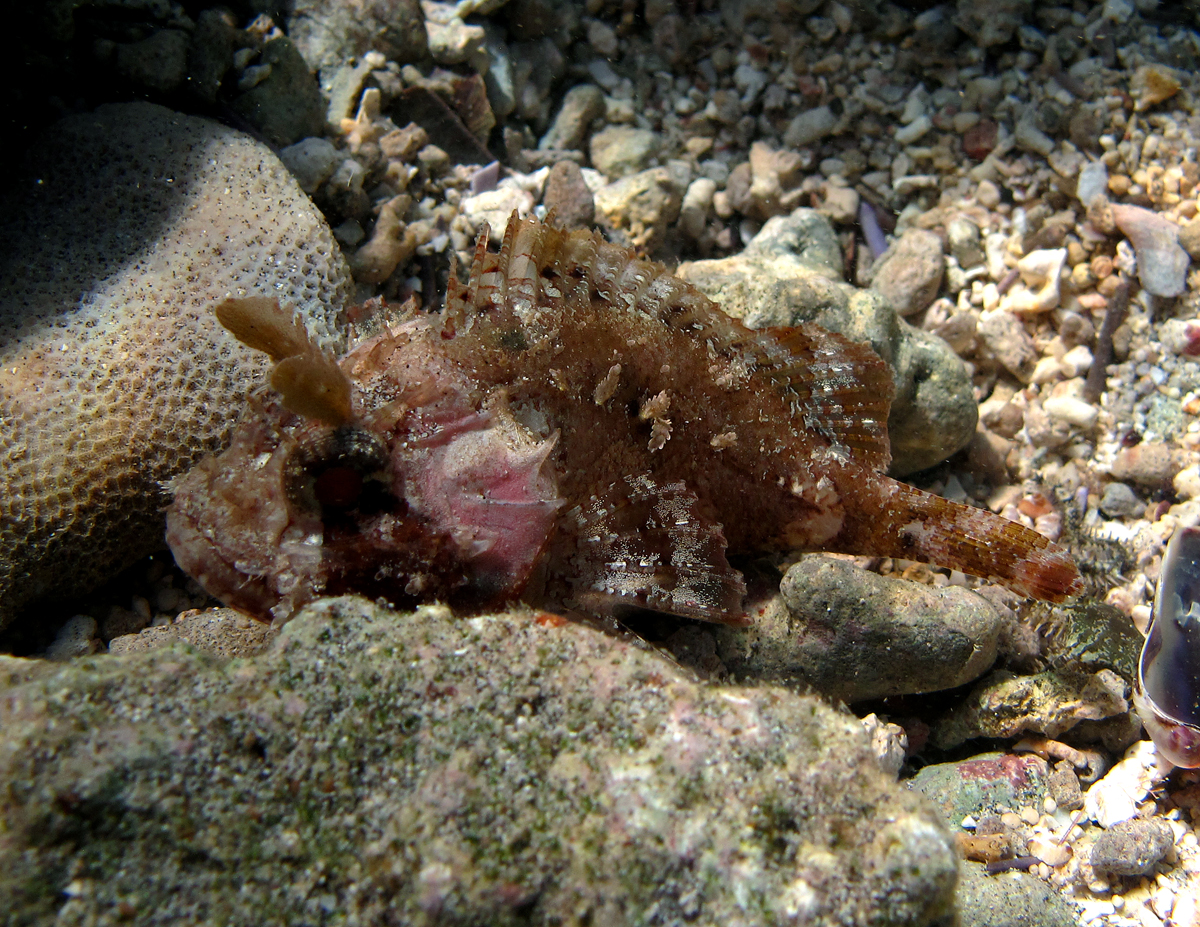
A McAdam's scorpionfish (Parascorpaena mcadamsi).

- Parascorpaena mossambica (W. K. H. Peters, 1855) (Mozambique scorpionfish)
- Parascorpaena moultoni (Whitley, 1961) (Coral perch)
- Parascorpaena picta (G. Cuvier, 1829) (Northern scorpionfish)
- Parascorpaena poseidon T. K. Chou and T. Y. Liao. 2022

Other authorities recognize more valid species and include:

- Parascorpaena armata (Sauvage 1873)
- Parascorpaena grandisquamis (Ogilby 1910)

FishBase places P. grandisquamis in Scorpaena and does not include P. armata in its online database, but Catalog of Fishes does recognize these as valid species.
