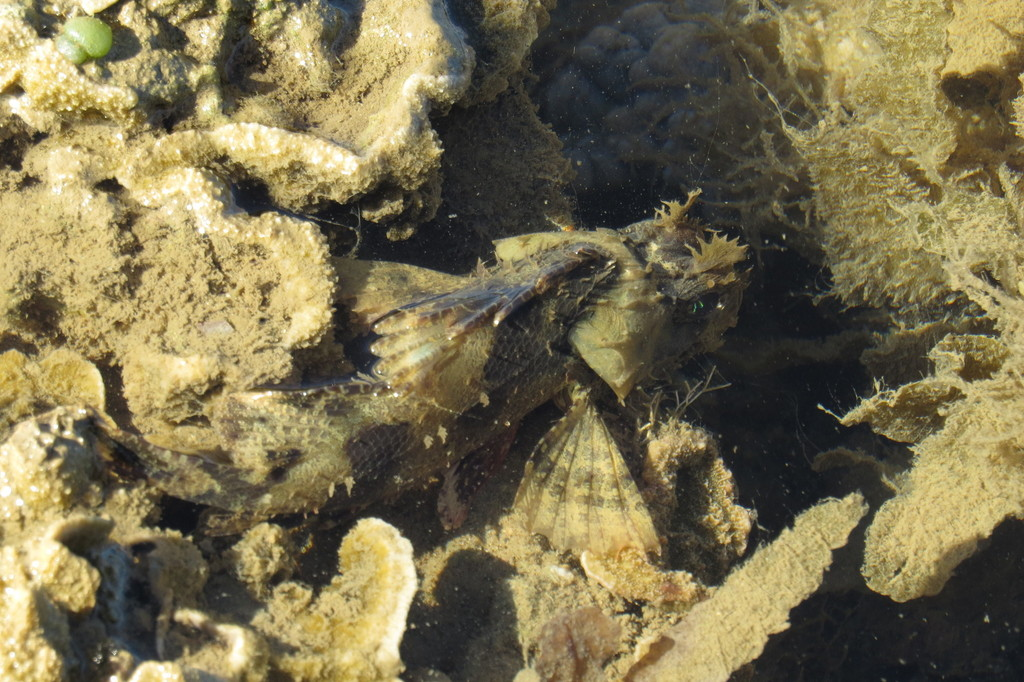
- Golden scorpionfish at Mowbray, Queensland

Conservation status
- Least Concern (IUCN 3.1)

Scientific classification
- Kingdom: Animalia
- Phylum: Chordata
- Class: Actinopterygii
- Order: Perciformes
- Family: Scorpaenidae
- Genus: Parascorpaena
- Species: P. aurita

Binomial name
- Parascorpaena aurita (Rüppell, 1838)

Synonyms
- Scorpaena aurita Rüppell, 1838; Scorpaena burra Richardson, 1842; Scorpaena bynoensis Richardson, 1845; Parascorpaena bynoensis (Richardson, 1845); Sebastapistes bynoensis (Richardson, 1845); Scorpaena stokesii Richardson, 1846; Scorpaena bellicosa Castelnau, 1875

= Parascorpaena aurita =

Species of fish

Parascorpaena aurita, the golden scorpionfish or byno scorpionfish, is a species of marine ray-finned fish belonging to the family Scorpaenidae, the scorpionfishes. This species is native to the Indian Ocean and the western Pacific Ocean.

== Taxonomy ==
Parascorpaena aurita was first formally described as Scorpaena aurita by the German naturalist and explorer Eduard Rüppell with the type biology given as Massawa in Eritrea. The specific name aurita means "eared", a reference to the rear end of the gill cover extending below the lateral line as a rounded lobe resembling an ear.

== Description ==
Parascorpaena aurita has very variegated colouration on its body, mostnly brownish or greyish, interspersed with irregular blotches which are a combination of any of blackish, reddish, yellowish brown or white. The underside of the head is white with brownish or reddish blotches. The spiny part of the dorsal fin is also strongly variegated, although it has no distinct black blotches in either sex. The soft-rayed part of the dorsal fin is translucent white and has four ill-defined dark blotches. The lower part of the pectoral fin is white, with indistinct reddish-brown spots. The base of the pelvic fin is white with reddish-brown or brown distal part. The anal fin is whitish marked with three or four reddish-brown diagonal bands. The caudal fin is translucent white crossed by three brownish or greyish vertical bands, the first band at the base of the fin, second in the middle of the fin and the third at the posterior edge of the fin. The dorsal fin has 12 spines and 8–9, normally 9, soft rays while the anal fin has 3 spines and 5 soft rays. The pectoral fin has 16–18, typically 17 soft rays and the caudal fin has 11–12 branched rays. This species attains a maximum total length of 15 cm (5.9 in).

The golden scorpionfish is similar to the Northern scorpionfish (Parascorpaena picta) but can be distinguished by is well developed interorbital ridges which enclose a depression and its well-developed occipital depression.

== Distribution and habitat ==
Parascorpaena aurita is found in the Indian Ocean from the Red Sea, the coast of East Africa off Kenya and Tanzania, Madagascar, the Seychelles and then in the eastern Andaman Sea through Indonesia and Papua New Guinea and the Philippines, north to Japan and south to Australia and east to the Solomon Islands. In Australia its range extends from Shark Bay in Western Australia east to One Tree Island in Queensland, it also occurs at Lord Howe Island in the Tasman Sea. This is a species of weedy, coral, rocky and rubble areas on the reef flats or the reefs slopes, usually propped up on smaller blocks of coral. It is a shallow water species found at depths between 3 and 15 m (9.8 and 49.2 ft).

== Biology ==
Parascorpaena aurita is a camouflaged ambush predator.
