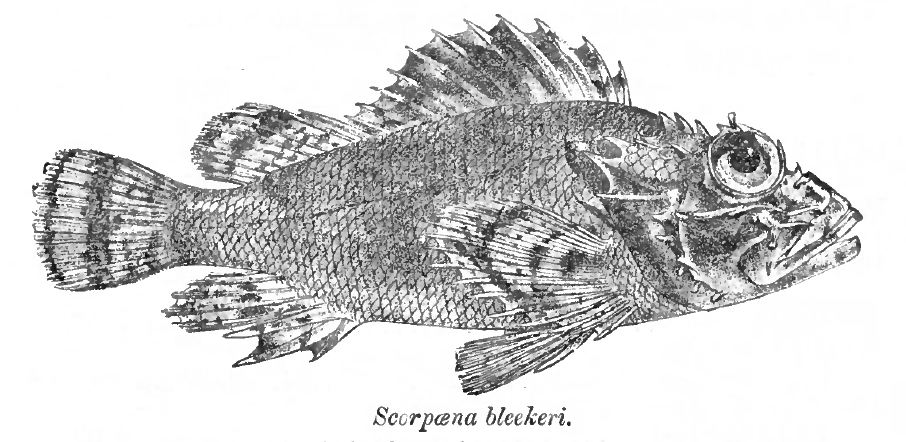

Conservation status
- Least Concern (IUCN 3.1)

Scientific classification
- Kingdom: Animalia
- Phylum: Chordata
- Class: Actinopterygii
- Order: Perciformes
- Family: Scorpaenidae
- Genus: Parascorpaena
- Species: P. picta

Binomial name
- Parascorpaena picta (Cuvier, 1829)

Synonyms
- Scorpaena picta Cuvier, 1829

= Parascorpaena picta =

Species of fish

Parascorpaena picta, the northern scorpionfish, painted scorpionfish or marbled rock cod is a species of marine ray-finned fish belonging to the family Scorpaenidae, the scorpionfishes. This species is native to the Indian Ocean and the western Pacific Ocean. This species grows to a length of 16 centimetres (6.3 in) TL.

== Taxonomy ==
Parascorpaena picta was first formally described in 1829 as Scorpaena picta, probably by the French zoologist Georges Cuvier with the type locality given as Java. The specimen was part of an extensive collection of flora and fauna assembled by Heinrich Kuhl and Johan Conrad van Hasselt, who are sometimes given as the authors of the species description. In 1876 the Dutch ichthyologist Pieter Bleeker placed this species in the monotypic genus Parascorpaena and he explicitly designated Scorpaena picta as the type species of the new genus. The specific epithet picta means "painted", a name provided by the collectors which Cuvier conserved, and which refers to the marbled pattern which is similar to other species of Scorpaena.

== Description ==
Parascorpaena picta has 12 spines and 8 to 9, typically 9, spines in its dorsal fin and 3 spines and 5 soft rays in its anal fin. The pectoral fins normally have 17 fin tays but infrequently these could number 16 or 18. The first and second suborbital ridges are fused, creating a single ridge which has two spines to the rear of the level of the orbit. There are no spines below the eye and the ridges between the eyes are weakly developed, and do not surround a hollow and there is a poorly developed occipital pit which is barely a hollow. The head is very large with a wide mouth and large bulging eyes that protrude above the dorsal profile of the head. The head and body have a number of skin flaps on them. This species attains a maximum total length of 16 cm (6.3 in). It has a mottled, brownish coloured body and there is no black spot on the spiny part of the dorsal fin.

The Northern scorpionfish is similar to the golden scorpionfish (Parascorpaena aurita) but can be distinguished by is poorly developed interorbital ridges which do not enclose a depression), its shallow occipital depression.

The poisonous spines of the fish are dangerous to humans.

== Distribution and habitat ==
Parascorpaena picta occurs in the shallow and sheltered waters of rocky bays and reef systems in the eastern Indian and western Pacific region. The range extends to northern coasts and islands of Australia, from Exmouth in the west to Moreton Bay in Queensland. it occurs on coral and rocky reefs in shallow waters, it is also found in silty habitats in sheltered bays. This species can be found at depths of less than 15 m (49 ft).

== Biology ==
Parascorpaena picta is a solitary species.
