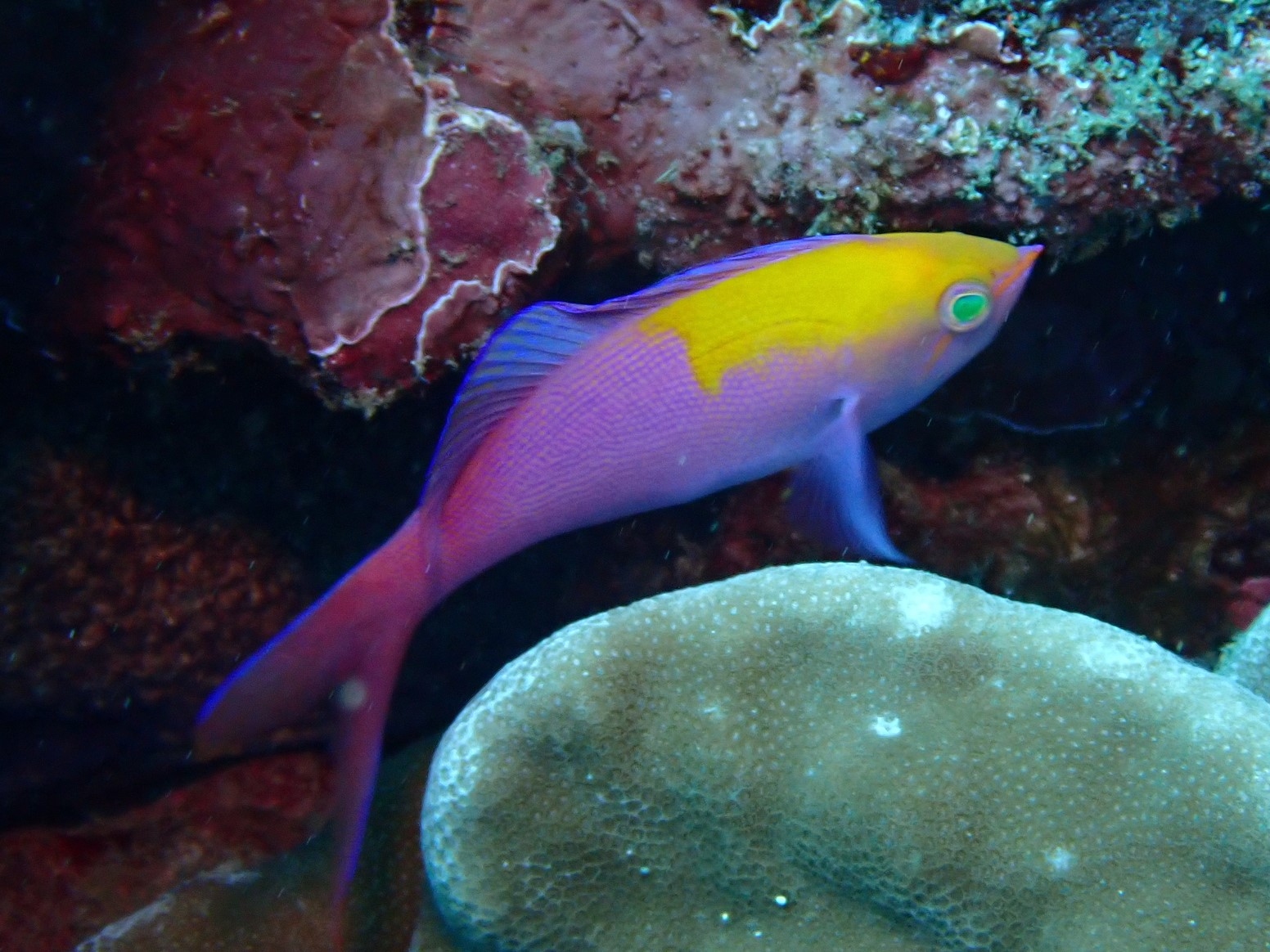

Conservation status
- Least Concern (IUCN 3.1)

Scientific classification
- Kingdom: Animalia
- Phylum: Chordata
- Class: Actinopterygii
- Order: Perciformes
- Family: Anthiadidae
- Genus: Nemanthias
- Species: N. regalis

Binomial name
- Nemanthias regalis (J. E. Randall & Lubbock, 1981)

Synonyms
- Anthias regalis Randall & Lubbock, 1981; Pseudanthias regalis (Randall & Lubbock, 1981)

= Nemanthias regalis =

Species of fish

Nemanthias regalis is a species of marine ray-finned fish in the grouper and sea bass family Serranidae. It is endemic to French Polynesia.
