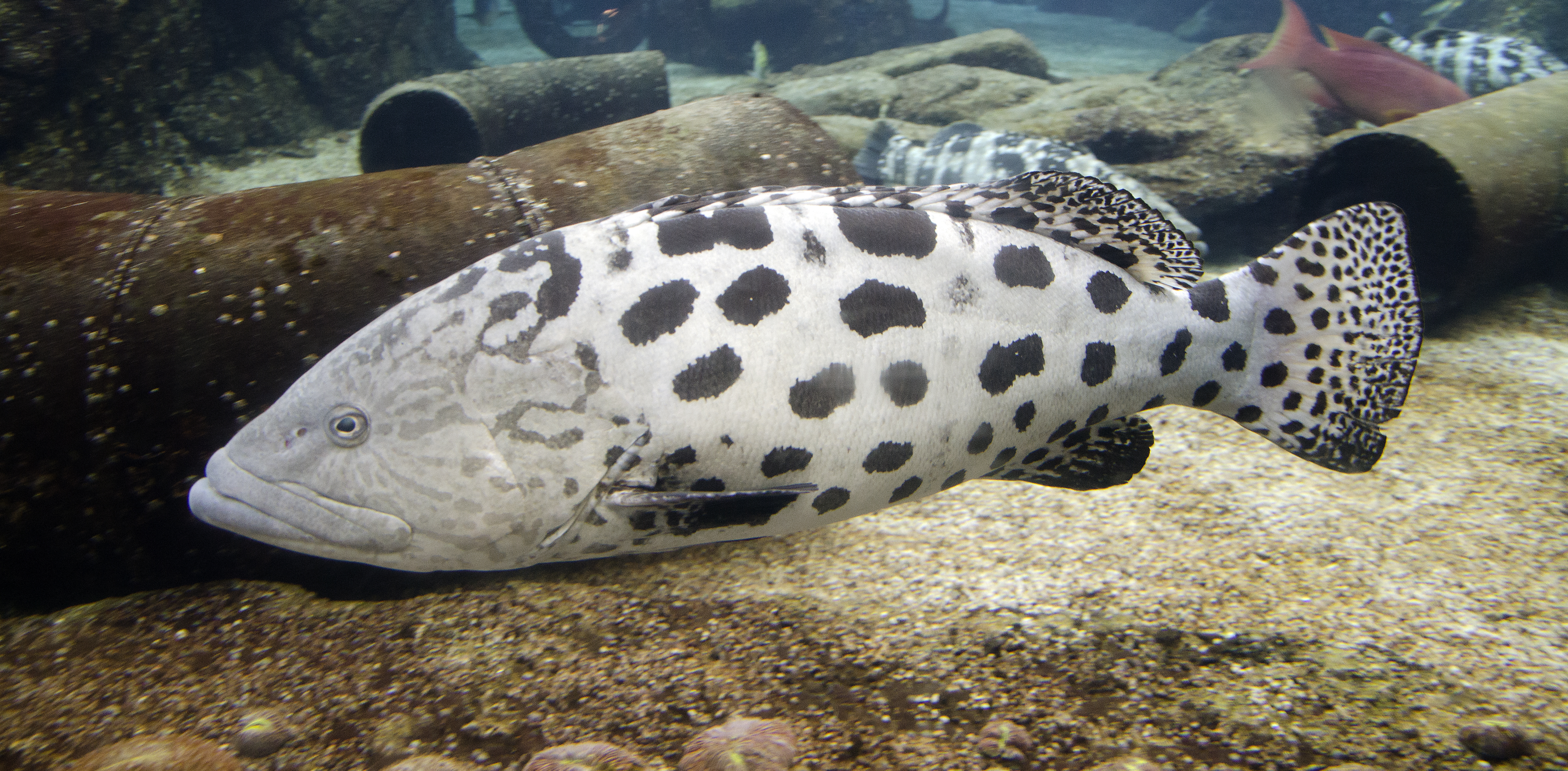

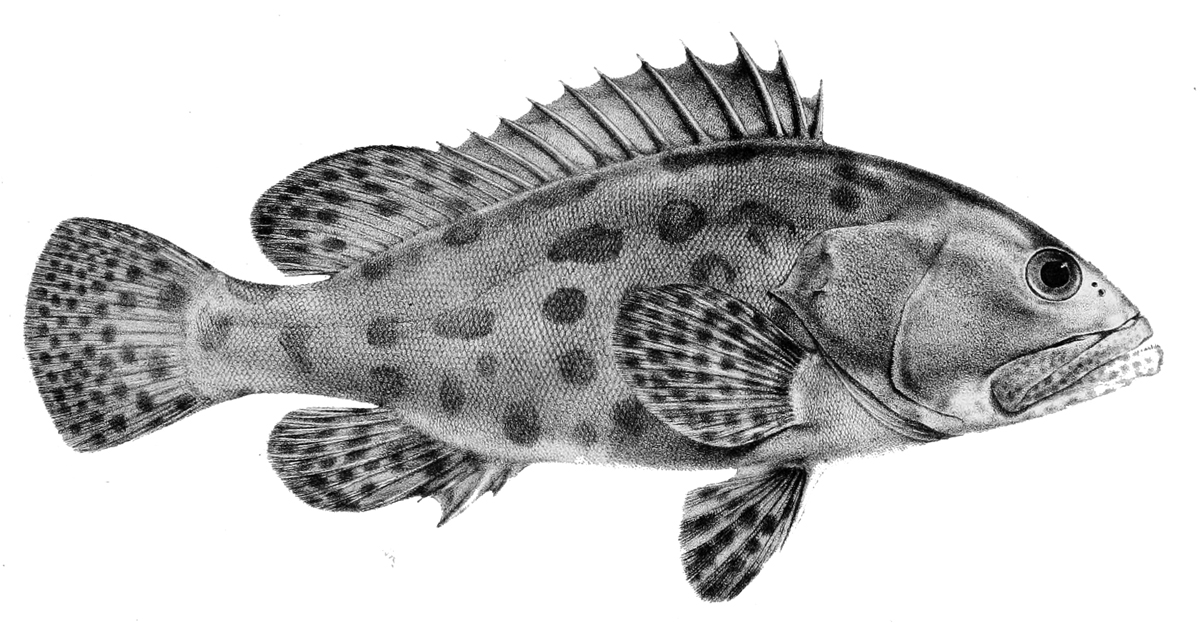

Conservation status
- Least Concern (IUCN 3.1)

Scientific classification
- Kingdom: Animalia
- Phylum: Chordata
- Class: Actinopterygii
- Division: Teleostei
- Order: Perciformes
- Family: Epinephelidae
- Genus: Epinephelus
- Species: E. tukula

Binomial name
- Epinephelus tukula Morgans, 1959

= Potato grouper =

Species of fish

The potato grouper (Epinephelus tukula), also called the potato cod or potato bass, is a species of marine ray-finned fish, a grouper from the subfamily Epinephelinae which is part of the family Serranidae, which also includes the anthias and sea basses. It has a wide Indo-Pacific distribution.

== Description ==
The potato grouper has a standard length which is 2.9 to 3.5 times its depth. It has a slightly convex region between the eyes and the dorsal profile of the head is straight. The preopercle is rounded or subangular and it has slightly enlarged serrations at its corner while the gill cover has a straight upper margin. There are 11 spines and 14-15 soft rays in the dorsal fin and three spines and eight rays in the anal fin. The membranes between the dorsal fin spines are notched. The caudal fin is rounded. This species is pale brownish-grey in overall colour and it is covered in large dark widely separated blotches. Dark lines radiate out from the eyes and there are small dark spots on the fins. This is a large and robust species of grouper which attains a maximum published length of 200 centimetres (79 in) and a weight of 110 kilograms (240 lb). The dark blotches on the body are thought to resemble potatoes in shape and thus give rise to the common name.

== Distribution ==
The potato grouper has a wide distribution in the Indian and Pacific Oceans but is uncommon to rare in most areas. It is commonest along the coast of eastern Africa from the Red Sea to KwaZulu-Natal in South Africa and around the Indian Ocean islands of Madagascar, Seychelles, Mauritius and Réunion. It further occurs off western India and Sri Lanka east into the Pacific where it reaches as far east as the Solomon Islands, north to southern Japan and south to Australia. It has not been recorded in the Persian Gulf. In Australia it is distributed from Shark Bay in Western Australia along the northern coasts to Moreton Bay in Queensland. It is also found on the Great Barrier Reef.

== Habitat and biology ==
The potato grouper are found in coral reefs in the channels in the reefs and around sea mounts in areas where there is a strong current. The juveniles prefer the shallow water and are often found in tidal pools on the reef, while the adults are found at depths between 10 and 150 metres (33 and 492 ft). They are solitary and usually remain within their home range. They are ambush predators which prey on small rays, crabs, fish, squid, octopodes and spiny lobsters. They hide from their prey using the coral as cover and lunge when the prey is in range, swallowing the prey item whole. They are aggressive and defend their territory but they have a relatively small home range. They reach sexual maturity at 90 to 99 centimetres (35 to 39 in) and a weight of 16 to 18 kilograms (35 to 40 lb), at approximately 12 years of age. Aggregations of smaller fishes have been observed but it is not known if this species aggregates to spawn. Captive specimens have been induced to change sex from female to male so the potato grouper may, like other groupers, be a protogynous hermaphrodite.

== Taxonomy ==
The potato cod was first formally described by R.L. Playfair and A. Günther as Serranus dispar (Playfair, 1867) and accepted as Epinephelus tukula (Morgans, 1959) as described by J.F.C. Morgans of the East African Fisheries Research Organization at Zanzibar with the type locality given as Mafia Island in Tanzania.

== Utilisation ==
The potato grouper is exploited by local and artisanal fisheries throughout its range and although it appears in the live food fish trade in Hong Kong and China, it is not popular there. It is thought to be vulnerable to overfishing but this does not appear to be a current threat to it and the IUCN have classified its conservation status as Least Concern. It is protected in South Africa and in Australia.

== See also ==
- Cod Hole
