= Scaly stargazer =

Scientific classification
- Kingdom: Animalia
- Phylum: Chordata
- Class: Actinopterygii
- Order: Labriformes
- Family: Uranoscopidae
- Genus: Pleuroscopus
- Species: P. pseudodorsalis

Binomial name
- Pleuroscopus pseudodorsalis Keppel Harcourt Barnard, 1927

Species of ray-finned fish

The scaly stargazer (Pleuroscopus pseudodorsalis) is a stargazer of the family Uranoscopidae. It is a demersal species which has been recorded at depths between 40 and 800 metres (130 and 2,620 ft), although it is most commonly recorded at 200–400 metres (660–1,310 ft). It has a maximum length of 33 centimetres (13 in). It is found in the South Atlantic, southern Indian Ocean and south western Pacific Ocean; in the South Atlantic it has been recorded from the Rio Grande Rise and the Walvis Ridge to the coasts of Namibia around southern Africa to the Madagascar Ridge, south of the island of Madagascar, in the south western Indian Ocean; in Australia it occurs from Western Australia and northern New South Wales, around New Zealand, and it also occurs on ocean ridge near Norfolk Island. It is the only species in the monotypic genus Pleuroscopus.
