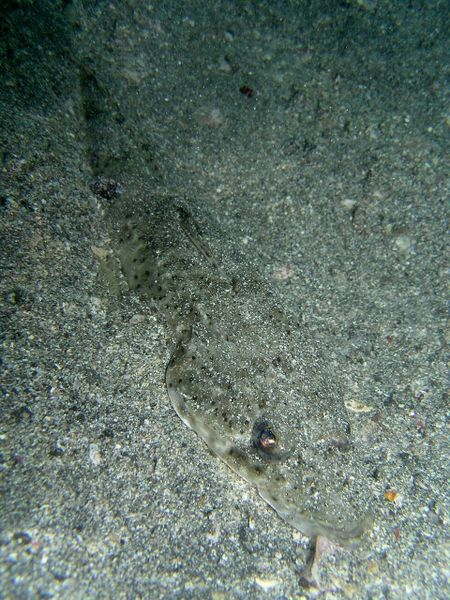
- Crocodile Flathead (C. crocodila)

Scientific classification
- Kingdom: Animalia
- Phylum: Chordata
- Class: Actinopterygii
- Order: Perciformes
- Family: Platycephalidae
- Genus: Cociella; Whitley, 1940

Type species
- Platycephalus crocodilus Cuvier, 1829

Synonyms
- Cocius D.S. Jordan & C. L. Hubbs, 1925

= Cociella =

Genus of fishes

Cociella is a genus of marine ray-finned fishes belonging to the family Platycephalidae, the flatheads. These fishes are found in the Indo-Pacific region.

== Taxonomy ==
Cociella was first proposed as a genus in 1940 by the Australian ichthyologist Gilbert Percy Whitley as a replacement for Cocius which had been put forward by David Starr Jordan and Carl Leavitt Hubbs in 1925 but this name was unavailable as it was preoccupied by the antlion genus Cocius., described by the Spanish entomologist Longinos Navás in 1921. Jordan and Hubbs designated Platycephalus crocodilus, a species described by Georges Cuvier in 1829 but no types are known, as the type species of their genus and Whitley retained it as the type species of the replacement. The genus is classified within the family Playcephalidae, the flatheads. The name of the genus, Cociella, is a diminutive form of the original name coined by Jordan and Hubbs which is thought to be a latinisation of the Japanese name for flatheads and dragonets.

== Species ==
There are currently six recognised species in this genus:

- Cociella crocodilus (G. Cuvier, 1829) (Crocodile flathead)
- Cociella heemstrai L. W. Knapp, 1996
- Cociella hutchinsi L. W. Knapp, 1996 (Brownmargin flathead)
- Cociella martingomoni Imamura & Aungtonya, 2020 (Martin Gomon's flathead)
- Cociella punctata (G. Cuvier, 1829) (Spotted flathead)
- Cociella somaliensis L. W. Knapp, 1996

C. punctata was regarded as a synonym of C. crocodilus, and C. heemstrai, C. hutchinsi and C. somaliensis were previously regarded as geographic populations of C. crocodilus.

== Characteristics ==
Cociella is characterised by having two separate patches of vomerine teeth and non depressible teeth in the jaws. There are more diagonal scale rows above the lateral line than there are lateral line scales. The lateral line scales are pored and have one opening. The lappet on the iris is a simple lobe and the side of the head has two ridges. There is a spine on the suborbital ridge below the middle of the eye and another under the rear of the eye. Spines may, or may not, be present behind the eye. The preoperculum has 3 spines with the upper spine being clearly the longest and lower having an accessory spine at its base. The maximum recorded total length is for C. crocodilus sensu lato and is 50 cm (20 in). while the smallest maximum recorded total length is for C. hutchinsi at 30 cm (12 in).

== Distribution ==
Cociella flatheads are found in the Indian and western Pacific Oceans from the eastern coast of Africa and the Red Sea east to New Caledonia, north to Japan and south to Australia.
