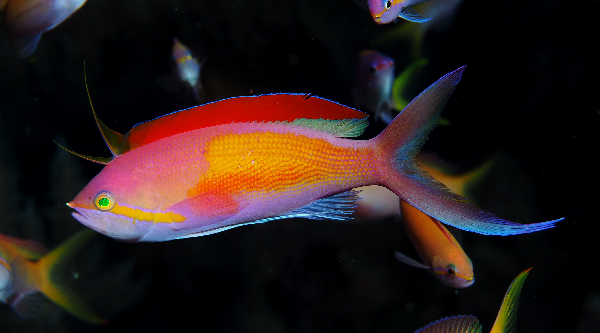

Conservation status
- Least Concern (IUCN 3.1)

Scientific classification
- Kingdom: Animalia
- Phylum: Chordata
- Class: Actinopterygii
- Division: Teleostei
- Order: Perciformes
- Family: Anthiadidae
- Genus: Nemanthias
- Species: N. carberryi

Binomial name
- Nemanthias carberryi J. L. B. Smith, 1954

Synonyms
- Emmelanthias stigmapteron J. L. B. Smith, 1955

= Threadfin anthias =

Species of ray-finned fish

The threadfin anthias (Nemanthias carberryi), or threadfin goldie, is a species of marine ray-finned fish in the family Anthiadidae, the anthias and fairy basslets. This species is found in the western Indian Ocean. It is found at depths of 10–30 m (33–98 ft) on coral reefs.

== Taxonomy ==
The threadfin anthias was first formally described in 1954 by the South African ichthyologist James Leonard Brierley Smith with its type locality given as Malindi in Kenya. This species is a member of the genus Nemanthias which is classified in the family Anthiadidae, which includes the anthias and fairy basslets, in the suborder Percoidei in the order Perciformes].

== Etymology ==
The threadfin anthias is classified in the genus Nemanthias, this name prefixes the name of the type genus of the family Anthiadidae, Anthias, with nema-, which means "thread", a reference to the first two dorsal fin spines which are thread-like. The specific name was stated by Smith to honour J. E. Carberry, probably John Evans Carberry who ran a business in Malindi in the 1950s.

== Description ==
The threadfin anthias has a fusiform body which reaches a maximum total length of 13 cm (5.1 in), It has 11 spines and 16-17 soft rays in its dorsal fin while the anal fin has 3 spines and 7 soft rays. The head and the anterior of body are pink, paler pink ventrally, grading to cerise on the underside of the caudal peduncle. The majority of the scales on flanks have scarlet margins with bright orange centres. There is a slender yellow and cerise stripe running from the snout to the eye and a red-edged yellow stripe running from the eye to the base of the pectoral fin. There are orange papillae on the front of the upper lip. The dorsal fin is scarlet with yellow wedge on the soft-rayed portion. The caudal fin is typically gold.

== Distribution and habitat ==
The threadfin anthias is found in the Western Indian Ocean from the Gulf of Aden south to South Africa and Madagascar, east tto the Maldives and the Chagos Archipelago. It is found at depths between 4 and 30 m (13 and 98 ft) on clearwater reefs.
