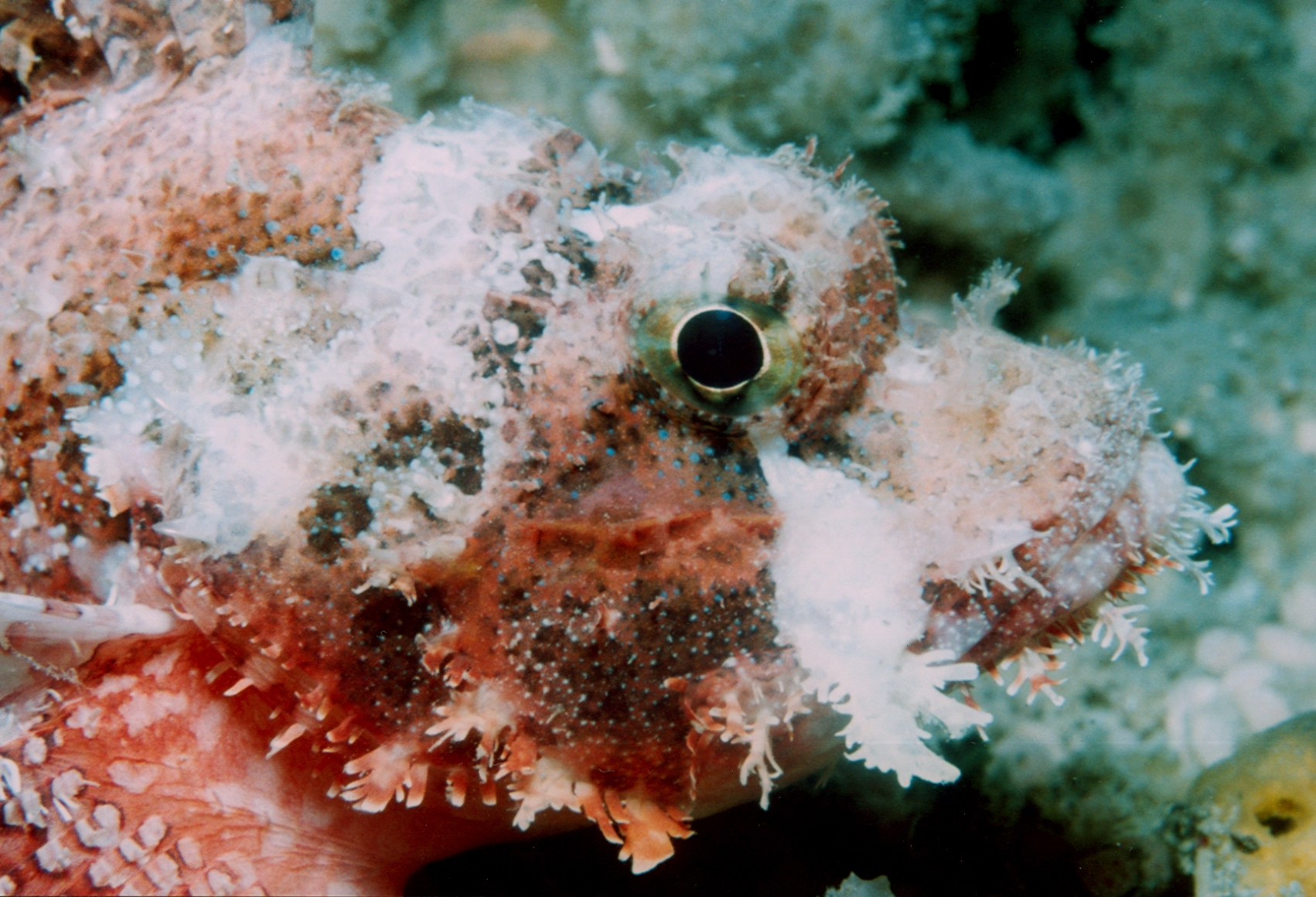

Conservation status
- Least Concern (IUCN 3.1)

Scientific classification
- Kingdom: Animalia
- Phylum: Chordata
- Class: Actinopterygii
- Division: Teleostei
- Order: Perciformes
- Family: Scorpaenidae
- Genus: Sebastapistes
- Species: S. strongia

Binomial name
- Sebastapistes strongia (G. Cuvier, 1829)

Synonyms
- Scorpaena strongia Cuvier, 1829; Scoraena laniara Cuvier, 1829; Scorpaena tristis Klunzinger, 1870; Sebastapistes tristis (Klunzinger, 1870); Scorpaena nuchalis Günther, 1874; Scorpaena bakeri Seale, 1901; Kantapus oglinus J. L. B. Smith, 1947; Scorpaena oglinus (J. L. B. Smith, 1947); Sebastapistes oglinus (J. L. B. Smith, 1947); Phenacoscorpius nebulosus J. L. B. Smith, 1958

= Barchin scorpionfish =

Species of fish

The barchin scorpionfish (Sebastapistes strongia) is a species of marine ray-finned fish belonging to the family Scorpaenidae, the scorpionfishes. It comes from the Indo-Pacific. The species is commonly seen in areas with mixed sand and rubble in reef flats, shallow lagoons, and channels.

== Taxonomy ==
The barchin scorpionfish was first formally described as Scorpaena strongia in 1829 by the French zoologist Georges Cuvier with the type locality given as Kosrae in the Caroline Islands in the Federated States of Micronesia. Cuvier described the species Scorpaena laniara in the same publication but S. strongia is accepted as the senior synonym through widespread usage and is the valid name for this taxon. When the American ichthyologist Theodore Gill described the genus Sebastapistes in 1877, he included 3 species within it but did not designate a type species; in 1898 David Starr Jordan and Barton Warren Evermann designated Scorpaena strongia as the type species. The specific name strongia refers to the type locality of Kosrae, which used to be called Strong's Island.

== Description ==
The barchin scorpionfish has 12 spines and 8 or 9 soft rays in its dorsal fin and 3 spines and 5 soft rays in its anal fin. This species has 2 lachrymal spines. It has a maximum published total length of 9.5 cm (3.7 in). There are stripes radiating out of the large eyes and there are sometimes branched cirri above the eyes. The overall colour is brown to reddish brown, with brown, white and black mottling.

== Distribution and habitat ==
The barchin scorpionfish has a wide Indo-Pacific distribution from the Red Sea and the eastern coast of Africa as far south a South Africa east through the Indian and Pacific Oceans to the Society Islands, north to Japan and south to Australia. It is found in shallo waters down to 37 m (121 ft), but it is typically found in water less than 3 m (9.8 ft) deep in mixed sand and rubble area of reef flats, shallow lagoons and channels.

== Biology ==
The barchin scorpionfish is a solitary nocturnal ambush predator, feeding on small fishes and crustaceans.

== Utilisation ==
The barchin scorpion is a rare species in the aquarium trade.
