= Blotched podge =

Conservation status
- Least Concern (IUCN 3.1)

Scientific classification
- Kingdom: Animalia
- Phylum: Chordata
- Class: Actinopterygii
- Order: Perciformes
- Family: Grammistidae
- Genus: Aporops; Schultz, 1943
- Species: A. bilinearis

Binomial name
- Aporops bilinearis Schultz, 1943

Synonyms
- Pseudogramma bilinearis (Schultz, 1943); Aporops allfreei J. L. B. Smith, 1953; Aporops japonicus Kamohara, 1957

Species of fish

The blotched podge (Aporops bilinearis) is a species of marine ray-finned fish, related to the groupers and classified within the family Grammistidae. It is found in shallow water in reefs and it is a solitary and rather cryptic species. It is found at depths between 1 and 35 metres (3.3 and 114.8 ft) from the eastern coast of Africa through the Indian Ocean east into the Pacific Ocean where its range extends as far as Johnston Atoll, Hawaii, the Line Islands and the Marquesas Islands, north to Japan and south to Australia. It is the only species in the genus Aporopos.
