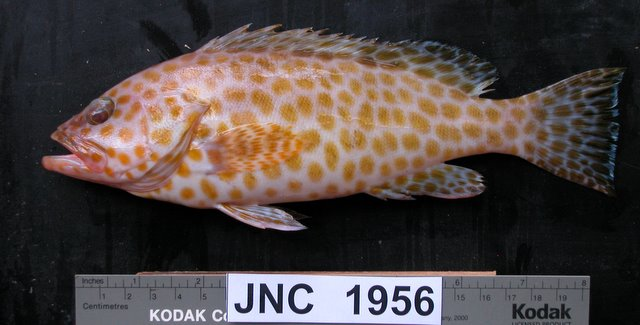
- Epinephelus areolatus from off New Caledonia

Conservation status
- Least Concern (IUCN 3.1)

Scientific classification
- Kingdom: Animalia
- Phylum: Chordata
- Class: Actinopterygii
- Order: Perciformes
- Suborder: Percoidei
- Family: Epinephelidae
- Genus: Epinephelus
- Species: E. areolatus

Binomial name
- Epinephelus areolatus (Forsskål, 1775)

Synonyms
- Perca areolata Forsskål, 1775; Bodianus melanurus Geoffroy Saint-Hilaire, 1817; Serranus angularis Valenciennes, 1828; Epinephelus angularis (Valenciennes, 1828); Serranus celebicus Bleeker, 1851; Serranus waandersii Bleeker, 1858; Epinephelus waandersii (Bleeker, 1858); Serranus glaucus Day, 1871; Epinephelus craspedurus D.S. Jordan & R.E. Richardson, 1910

= Areolate grouper =

Species of fish

The areolate grouper (Epinephelus areolatus), also known as the yellowspotted rockcod, areolate rockcod, green-spotted rock-cod, squaretail grouper or squaretail rock-cod, is a species of marine ray-finned fish, a grouper from the subfamily Epinephelinae which is part of the family Serranidae, which also includes the anthias and sea basses. It inhabits coral reefs in the Indo-Pacific region. They are produced through aquaculture and commercially fished. They currently face no threats to their survival.

== Description ==
The areolate grouper is a large fish (up to 47 cm long, 1.4 kg) that lives near coral reefs. Its coloration is whitish to gray with rounded brownish spots; it is particularly identifiable by a narrow, white, straight margin on its truncate tail. It has 11 dorsal spines, 15-17 dorsal soft rays, 3 anal spines and 8 anal soft rays.

It is often confused with the brownspotted grouper (Epinephelus chlorostigma) found in the Persian Gulf and several other many-spotted species.

== Distribution ==
Year	Farmed production	Capture production
	Metric tons	(Saudi Arabia
1993	512	in the Indian Ocean)
1994	508
1995	502
1996	750
1997	474
1998	180
1999	110
2000	104	306
2001	239	245
2002	157	289
2003	155	309
2004	155	349

The areolate grouper is found in the tropical region ranging from 35°N - 33°S, 29°E - 180°E. They are found in the Indo-Pacific region from the Red Sea and the Persian Gulf to Natal, South Africa and east to Fiji, north to Japan, south to the Arafura Sea and northern Australia. It was recently recorded to have been observed in Tonga, but appears to be absent from areas in the western Indian Ocean. Recently (2015) a single specimen was reported from the Mediterranean Sea, off Israel.

This grouper is usually found in seagrass beds or on fine sediment bottoms near rocky reefs, dead coral, or alcyonarian corals. in shallow continental shelf waters. Juveniles are common at water depths to 80 m (260 ft); eggs and early larvae are probably pelagic.

== Reproduction and feeding ==
Like other groupers, the areolate grouper is a sex-changing species; young are female, and some change to male with maturity. Maturity is reached at a fork length of 22 cm (8.7 in), and spawning usually occurs during the months of May, June, October and December.

After hatching, wild grouper larvae eat copepods and other small zooplankton. Areolate grouper feed on fish and benthic (bottom-dwelling) invertebrates, primarily prawns and crabs.

== Commercial production ==
The areolate grouper is one of about 16 species of groupers commonly raised using aquaculture. Floating net cages, the primary culture method, are supported by a floating frame of plastic pipe, wood, or other material, and usually are anchored to the sea floor. This method is simple, has low capital investment, and uses existing bodies of water, so production can be easily increased or decreased. Disadvantages compared to pond culture include vulnerability to external water quality problems and predators. Also, no control over water temperature, which is known to strongly affect growth rates, is possible.

Grouper consistently demands a high market price, so fishing pressure is intense. To alleviate the pressure on wild grouper stocks, many nations have promoted aquaculture in the hopes of producing a more sustainable grouper yield. Hong Kong is the primary producer of areolate grouper raised by aquaculture, and about 155 metric tons were produced in 2004. Full-cycle culture of most grouper species, including the areolate grouper, is not yet possible, although several important advances have been made in recent years. For this reason, about two-thirds of all grouper culture, including culture of E. areolatus, involves the capture of wild grouper eggs which are then grown out in aquaculture. This is called capture-based aquaculture (CBA). The wild eggs are gathered by a variety of artisanal methods, and because success is not predictable, the production varies as well.

Commercial fishing for areolate grouper done with long lines and hand lines. While its popularity for food has led to some species being threatened, currently no threat to the survival of E. areolatus exists. The table at right shows the amount of areolate grouper produced by farming between 1992 and 2004 and the amount produced by capture in Saudi Arabia (Indian Ocean) between 1996 and 2004, according to the Food and Agriculture Organization of the United Nations
