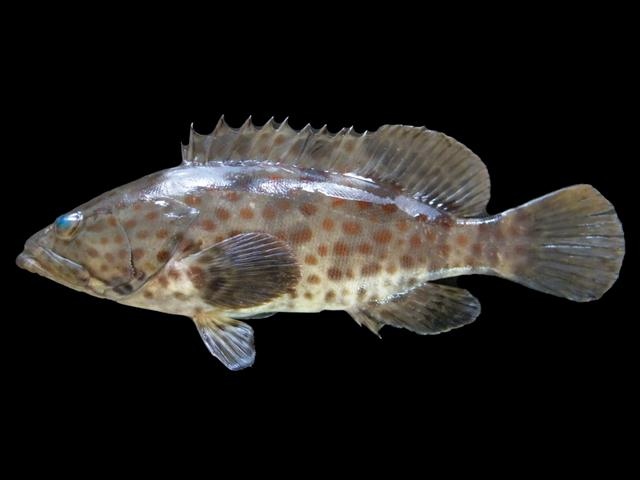

Conservation status
- Least Concern (IUCN 3.1)

- Vulnerable (IUCN 3.1)(Persian Gulf)

Scientific classification
- Kingdom: Animalia
- Phylum: Chordata
- Class: Actinopterygii
- Division: Teleostei
- Order: Perciformes
- Suborder: Percoidei
- Family: Epinephelidae
- Genus: Epinephelus
- Species: E. coioides

Binomial name
- Epinephelus coioides (Hamilton, 1822)

Synonyms
- Bola coioides Hamilton, 1822; Serranus nebulosus Valenciennes, 1828; Cephalopholis nebulosus (Valenciennes, 1828); Epinephelus nebulosus (Valenciennes, 1828); Serranus suillus Valenciennes, 1828; Epinephelus suillus (Valenciennes, 1828); Homalogrystes guntheri Alleyne & Macleay, 1877

= Orange-spotted grouper =

Species of fish

The orange-spotted grouper (Epinephelus coioides), also known as the brown-spotted rockcod, estuary cod, estuary rockcod, goldspotted rockcod, greasy cod, North-west groper, orange spotted cod or blue-and-yellow grouper, is a species of marine ray-finned fish, a grouper from the subfamily Epinephelinae which is part of the family Serranidae, which also includes the anthias and sea basses. It has an Indo-Pacific distribution and is found in marine and brackish waters.

== Description ==
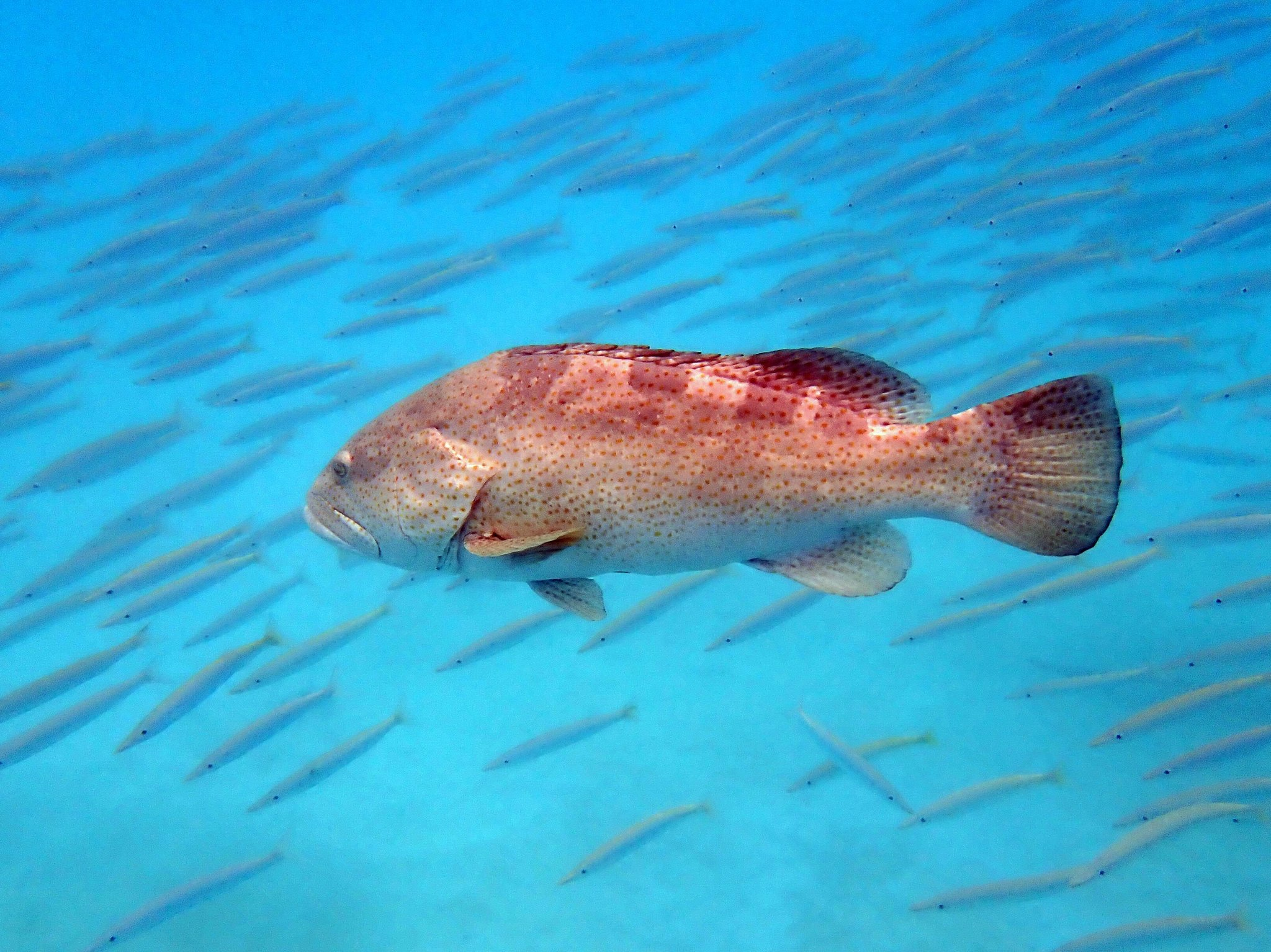
Epinephelus coioides at Heron Island, Australia

The orange-spotted grouper has an elongate body which has a standard length that is 2.9 to 3.7 times its depth. The dorsal profile of the head is flat or slightly convex between the eyes, the preopercle has enlarged serrations at its angle and a shallow notch just above the angle. The upper margin of the gill cover may be straight or slightly convex. The dorsal fin contains 11 spines and 13-16 soft rays while the anal fin has 3 spines and 8 soft rays. The membranes between the dorsal fin spines are obviously incised. The caudal fin is rounded. There are 58-65 scales in the lateral line. The head and body are light brown on the back lightening to whitish on the underparts. There are four oblique "H-shaped" dark markings on the flanks and 3-4 dark saddle like blotches along the back while the head, body and fins are covered in numerous small brown or orange spots. The spots are larger and less numerous in juveniles, shrinking in size and multiplying in number as the fish grows. The maximum published total length is 120 centimetres (47 in) and the maximum weight is 15 kilograms (33 lb).

== Distribution ==
The orange-spotted grouper has an Indo-Pacific distribution. It is found along the eastern coast of Africa which extends from the Gulf of Suez south as far as Durban in South Africa. It is also found off Madagascar, Mauritius, and Réunion and in the Persian Gulf eastward into the Pacific Ocean as far as Palau and Fiji. Its range extends north to Japan and south to Australia. In Australia it occurs from Carnarvon, Western Australia along the tropical northern coasts to the Solitary Islands in New South Wales. It was observed first in the Mediterranean Sea off Israel in 1969 and has been recorded rarely since. This species has been tested in several countries for mariculture, which is a possible vector for its introduction.

== Habitat and biology ==
The orange-spotted grouper occurs in coral reefs, especially those along mainland coasts and large islands. The juveniles are frequently encountered in estuaries where there are sand, mud and gravel substrates and in mangroves. This is a predatory species which preys on fishes, shrimp, crabs and other benthic crustaceans. At night these fish will at least partially bury themselves in the mud. They are diandric protogynous hermaphrodites, some males develop from juveniles to males while others develop from functional females to males when they reach lengths of around 67 centimetres (26 in) and an age of 7.5 years. Off Papua New Guinea they have been reported to gather to spawn in aggregations of around 1,500 individuals and this takes place for 3–4 days each month over a muddy and sandy substrate. In the Persian Gulf there is a spawning season which occurs from March to June. The eggs and larvae are thought to be pelagic.

== Importance to humans ==
Unfortunately, orange spotted groupers have been severely overexploited and fished. In any country where they can be found, their numbers have dwindled or are dwindling. They are mostly targeted using fish traps, and have spectacular tasting flesh which attains a high value in markets. In the UAE, the brunt of the overexploitation is easily visible. It has been assessed that they have been overexploited 7 times the normal level, and fisherman have described: "20 years ago, one net catches you 50kg. Now we use 100 nets and get 10kg of fish". They are slow-growing due to their quite lazy preying methods, mature late, and produce little eggs. The more sought-after larger male fish have been most affected, creating an imbalance between the genders affecting their populations further.

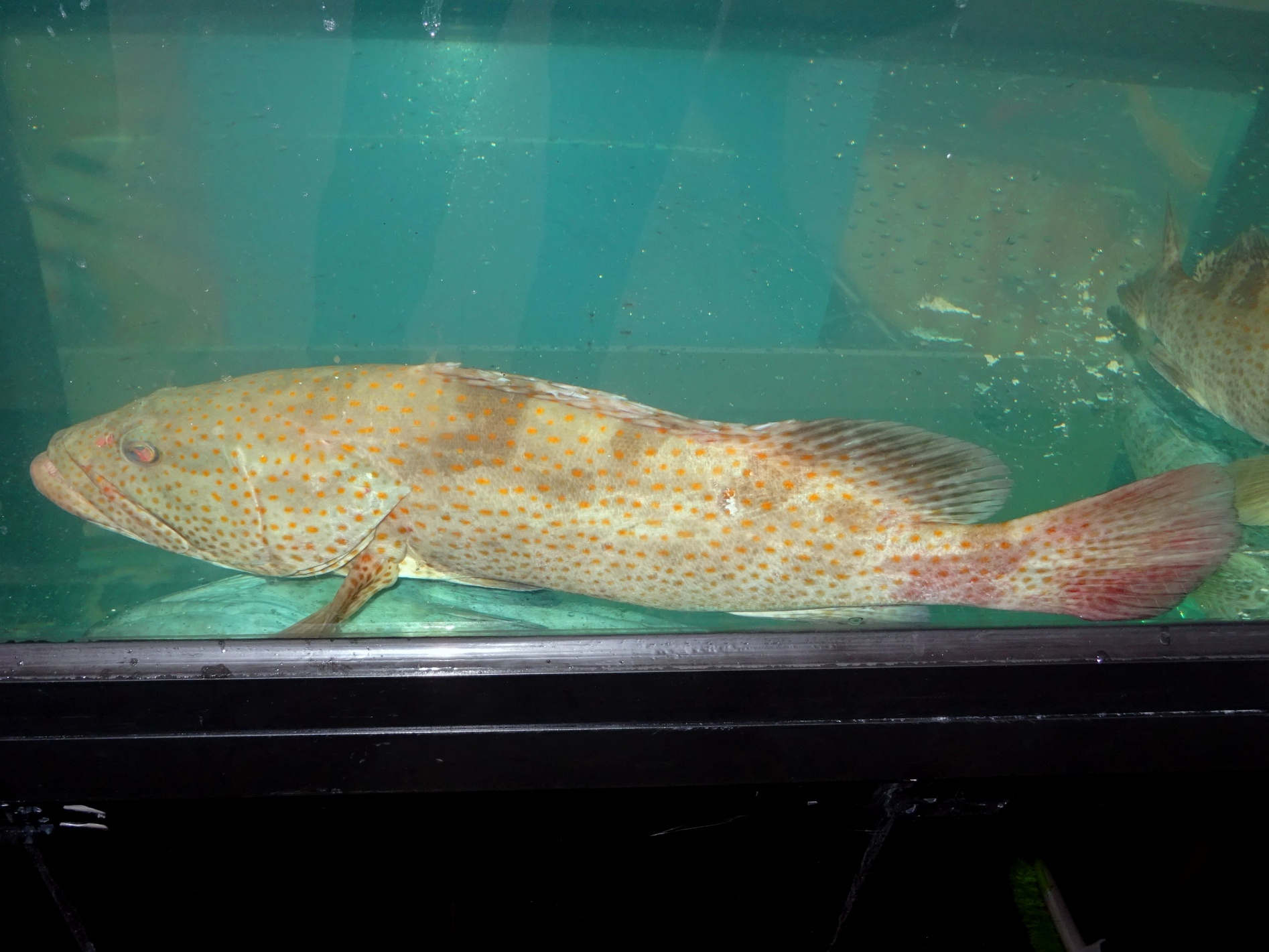
Available on the market in Sharjah, UAE

== Taxonomy ==
The orange-spotted grouper was first formally described by the Scottish physician and naturalist Francis Buchanan-Hamilton (1762-1829) as Bola coioides in 1822 with the type locality given as the estuary of the Ganges. This species closely resembles and is probably closely related to E. malabaricus and E. tauvina.

== Utilisation ==
The orange-spotted grouper is a target for commercial fisheries throughout its range where it is esteemed as a food fish. It is sold live as well as fresh and it has been attempted to culture it and breed it in aquaculture.
