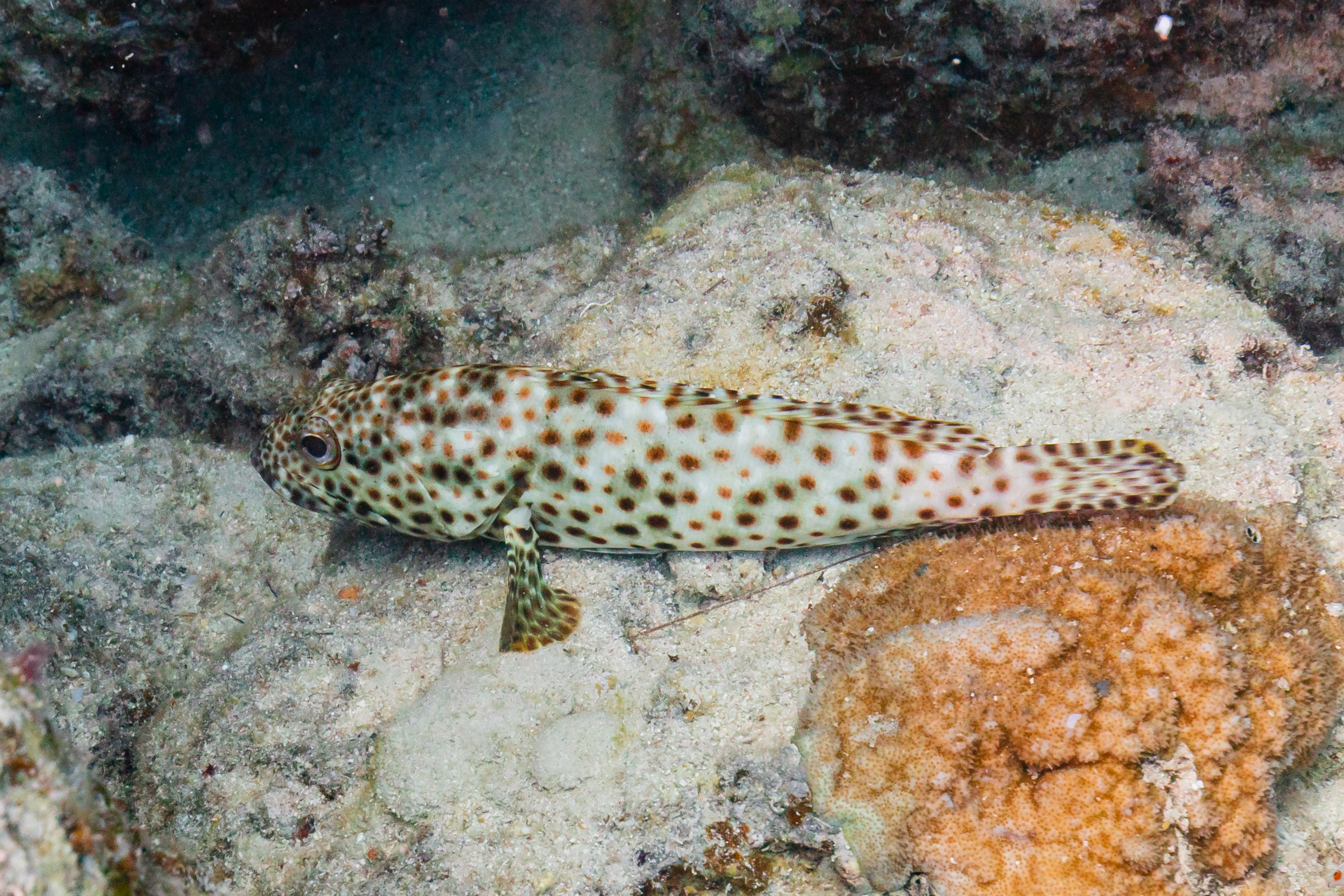

Conservation status
- Data Deficient (IUCN 3.1)

Scientific classification
- Kingdom: Animalia
- Phylum: Chordata
- Class: Actinopterygii
- Order: Perciformes
- Family: Epinephelidae
- Genus: Epinephelus
- Species: E. tauvina

Binomial name
- Epinephelus tauvina (Forsskål, 1775)

Synonyms
- Perca tauvina Forsskål, 1775; Cephalopholis tauvina (Forsskål, 1775); Holocentrus pantherinus Lacépède, 1802; Serranus pantherinus (Lacépède, 1802); Serranus jansenii Bleeker, 1857; Serranus goldiei Macleay, 1882; Epinephelus elongatus Schultz, 1953; Epinephelus chewa Morgans, 1966

= Greasy grouper =

Species of fish

The greasy grouper (Epinephelus tauvina), also known as the Arabian grouper or greasy rockcod, is an Indo-Pacific fish species of economic importance belonging to the family Serranidae.

== Distribution ==
The greasy grouper occurs in the Red Sea and along the East African coast, east to the Pitcairn group, north to Japan, and south to Lord Howe Island. It is not common in Fiji, Tonga, or French Polynesia.

== Habitat ==
The species inhabits clear-water areas on coral reefs (at depths to 50 m), although juveniles may venture into reef flats, tidepools, and mangrove estuaries.

== Description ==
Epinephelus tauvina grows up to 75 cm (30 inches) in length. These fish have a wide, upward-facing mouth with rather thick lips. Their heads and bodies are pale greenish grey or brown with round spots, varying from orange-red to dark brown. A group of black spots may be visible on the body at the base of the rear of the dorsal fin. Five vertical darker shaded bars may also be present on their bodies.

It is similar to E. corallicola and E. howlandi, which, however, have shorter bodies and spots less closely spaced.

Due to confusion about identifying species, much of the earlier (particularly before 1984) literature referring to E. tauvina may actually refer to other species of grouper, including Epinephelus coioides, Epinephelus malabaricus and Epinephelus lanceolatus.

== Biology ==
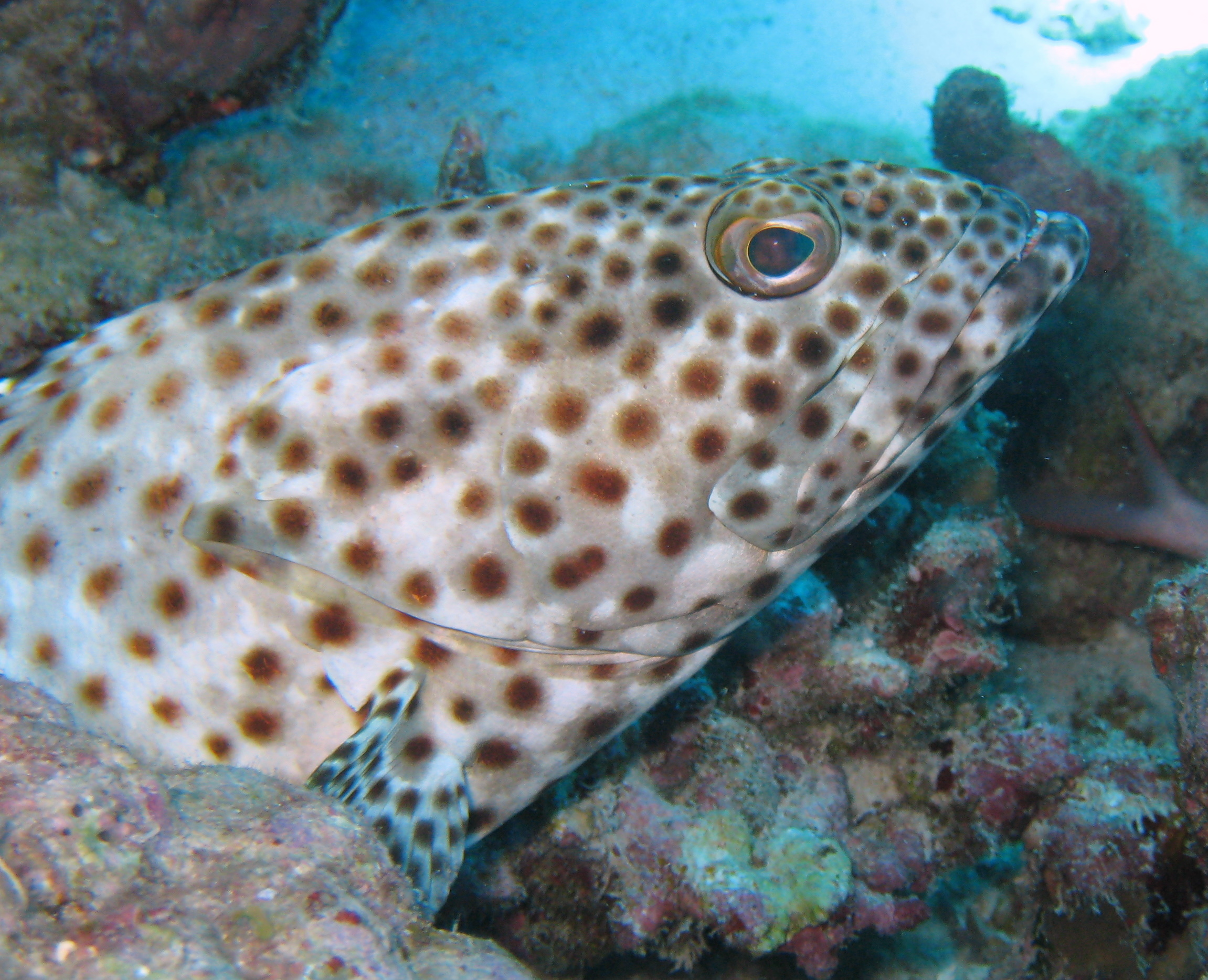
Detail of the head

The greasy grouper is a long-lived fish with a very slow growth rate. It is a protogynous hermaphrodite. Greasy groupers are top predators on the reef; they mainly feed on small fish and sometimes crustaceans.

== Fisheries ==
The greasy grouper is caught in recreational fisheries (including spearfishing and hook-and-line fishing) and plays a major role in commercial fisheries. It is also found in the aquarium trade. Total production in 2013 was 16,234 tonnes (combined recreational fisheries, commercial fisheries, and aquaculture).
