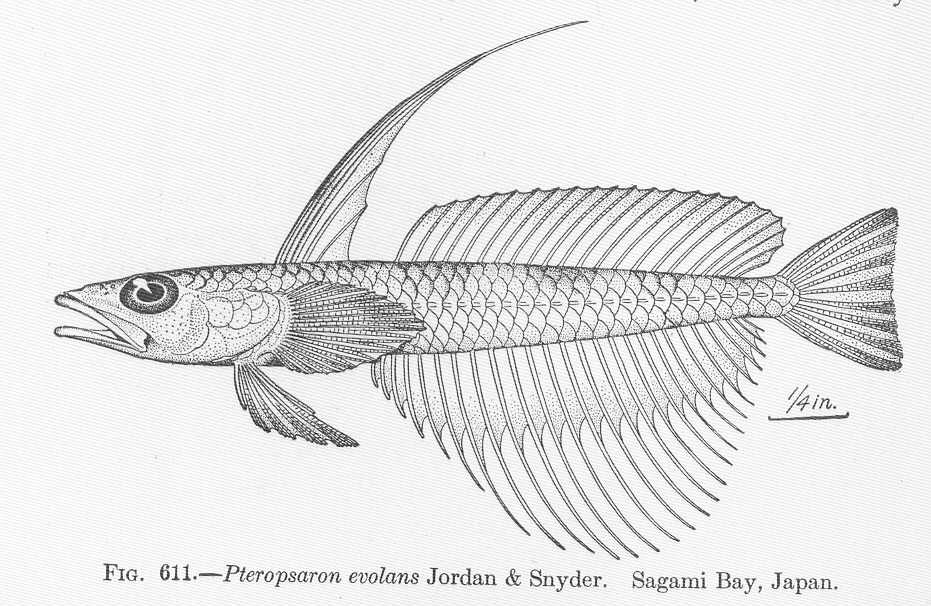
- Pteropsaron evolans

Scientific classification
- Kingdom: Animalia
- Phylum: Chordata
- Class: Actinopterygii
- Order: Acropomatiformes
- Family: Hemerocoetidae
- Genus: Pteropsaron; D. S. Jordan & Snyder, 1902

Type species
- Pteropsaron evolans Jordan & Snyder 1902

= Pteropsaron =

Genus of ray-finned fishes

Pteropsaron is a genus of ray-finned fish in the family Hemerocoetidae.

== Species ==
There are currently 9 recognized species of this genus:

- Pteropsaron dabfar Iwamoto, 2014
- Pteropsaron evolans D. S. Jordan & Snyder, 1902
- Pteropsaron heemstrai J. S. Nelson, 1982
- Pteropsaron incisum C. H. Gilbert, 1905
- Pteropsaron indicum Benjamin C. Victor & A. Biju Kumar, 2019
- Pteropsaron levitoni Iwamoto, 2014
- Pteropsaron longipinnis G. R. Allen, Erdmann, 2012 (Midwater sand-diver)
- Pteropsaron natalensis J. S. Nelson, 1982
- Pteropsaron neocaledonicus Fourmanoir & Rivaton, 1979
- Pteropsaron springeri D. G. Smith & G. D. Johnson, 2007 (Springer's sand-diver)
