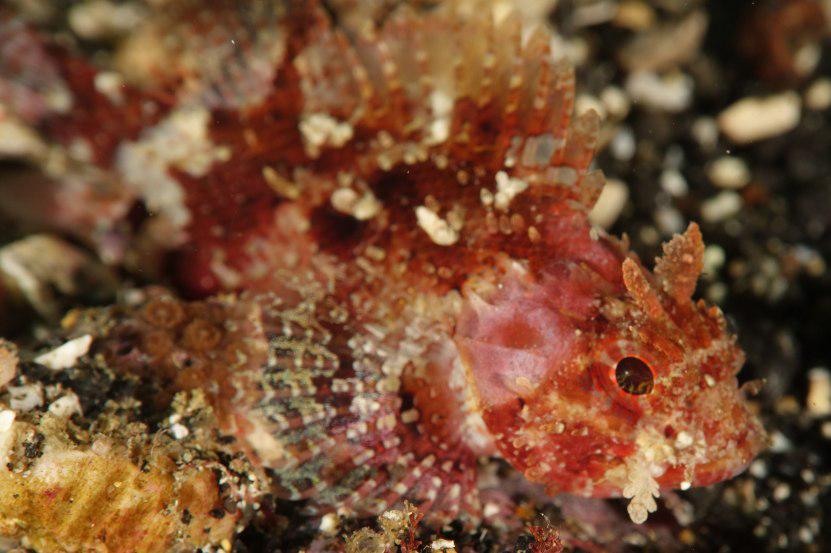

Conservation status
- Least Concern (IUCN 3.1)

Scientific classification
- Kingdom: Animalia
- Phylum: Chordata
- Class: Actinopterygii
- Order: Perciformes
- Family: Scorpaenidae
- Genus: Parascorpaena
- Species: P. mossambica

Binomial name
- Parascorpaena mossambica (W. K. H. Peters, 1855)

Synonyms
- Scorpaena mossambica W. K. H. Peters, 1855

= Parascorpaena mossambica =

Species of fish

Parascorpaena mossambica, the Mozambique scorpionfish, is a species of marine ray-finned fish belonging to the family Scorpaenidae, the scorpionfishes. This species is native to the Indian Ocean and the Pacific Ocean to Micronesia, although the Pacific populations may be a separate species. It occasionally makes its way into the aquarium trade. It grows to a length of 10 centimetres (3.9 in) TL.

== Taxonomy ==
Parascorpaena mossambica was first formally described as Scorpaena mossambica in 1855 by the German naturalist and explorer Wilhelm Peters with the type locality given as Ibo in Mozambique. It is thought that there are two species and that the specimens from the Pacific Ocean should be assigned to Parascorpaena armata and that P. mossambica is only valid for Indian Ocean populations. The specific name refers to the type locality, Mozambique.

== Description ==
Parascorpaena mossambica is a brown or reddish colored scorpionfish with a mottled pattern. It has long tentacles which sit on the supraorbital bone. The dorsal fin has 12 spines and 9-10 soft rays while the anal fin has 3 spines and 5 soft rays. The pectoral fins have 15-17 fin rays and the pectoral fin has a single spine and 5 soft rays. This species reaches a maximum total length of 12 cm (4.7 in).

== Distribution and habitat ==
Parascorpaena mossambica sensu lato is an Indo-West Pacific species which occurs from the coast of east Africa to the central Pacific. P. mossambica sensu stricto is found in the Western Indian Ocean and P. armata is found from the central Indian Ocean eastwards into the Pacific. It is a ref associated fish occurring in shallow water down to 18 m (59 ft) where there are mixed sand and rubble in reef flats, shallow lagoons and in channels in the reef.

== Biology ==
Parascorpaena mossambica is a solitary, nocturnal fish which hides during the day and comes out into the open during the night. The fin spines of this species bear venom glands.

== See also ==
- List of marine aquarium fish species
