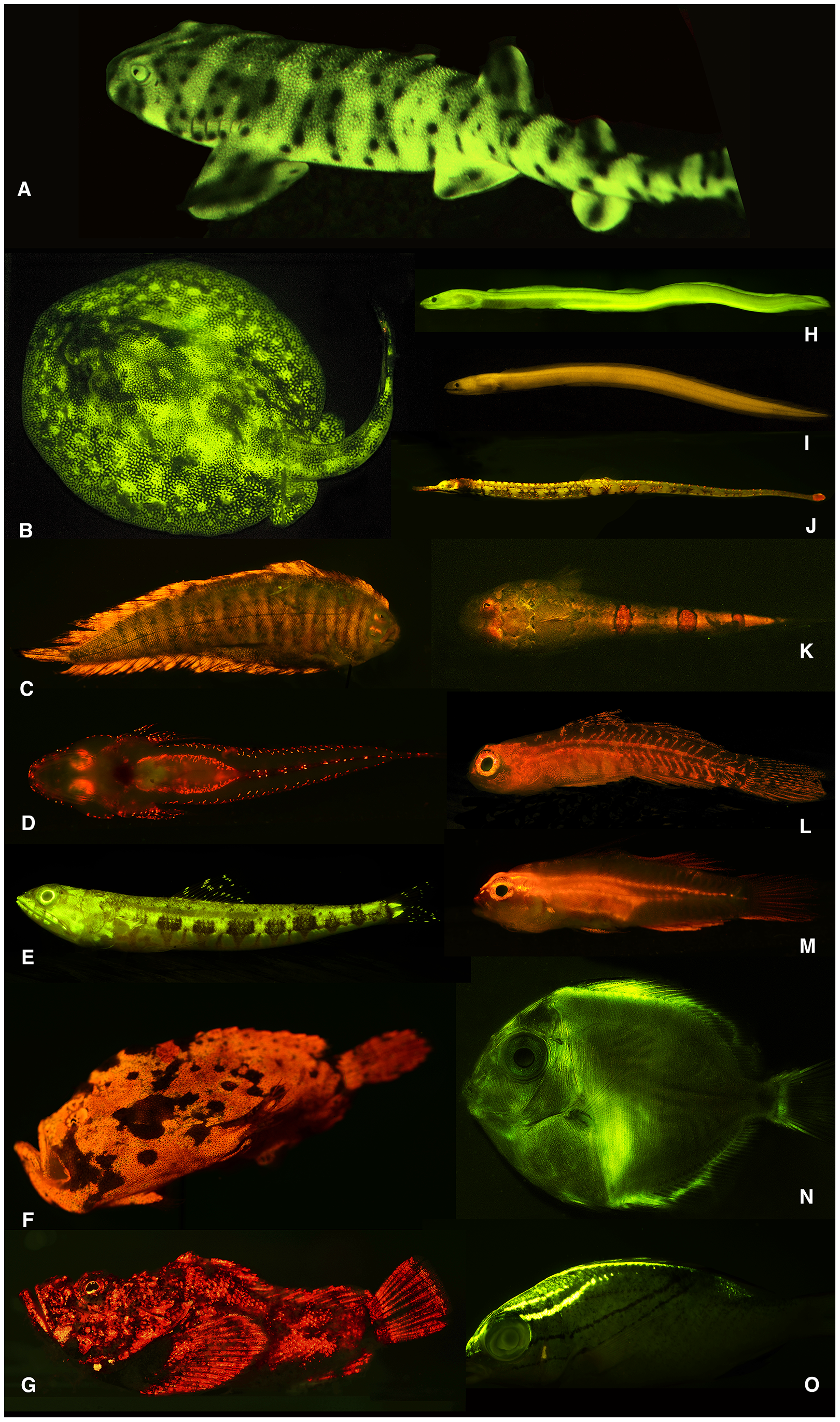
- D = Brownmargin flathead

Scientific classification
- Kingdom: Animalia
- Phylum: Chordata
- Class: Actinopterygii
- Order: Perciformes
- Family: Platycephalidae
- Genus: Cociella
- Species: C. hutchinsi

Binomial name
- Cociella hutchinsi Knapp, 1996

= Brownmargin flathead =

Species of fish

The brownmargin flathead (Cociella hutchinsi) is a species of marine ray-finned fish belonging to the family Platycephalidae, the flatheads. It is found off northern Australia.

== Taxonomy ==
The brownmargin flathead was first formally described in 1996 by Leslie W. Knapp with its type locality given as the Arafura Sea. This taxon was previously regarded as a population of the crocodile flathead (C. crocodilus) but were recognised as a valid species in 1996. The specific name honours the Australian ichthyologist Barry Hutchins of the Western Australian Museum in recognition of the help Knapp received from him in his research on Australian flatheads.

== Description ==
The brownmargin flathead has an elongated, moderately flattened body with a large flattened head with two ridges on its lower edge and large eyes. These have a simple lappet on their irises. It has a large semicircular mouth which extends to the level of the front of the eye. there are typically two spines on the preoperculum, with a very small third spine occasionally present, the upper spine is the longest almost reaching the edge of the operculum. There is a weak preorbital spine which is frequently lacking. The supraorbital ridge is typically smooth at the front and has between seven and ten 7-10 small spines on its rear. The suborbital ridge has two spines under eye and three or four spines to the rear of the eye. The first dorsal fin contains seven or eight spines with an additional very small separate spine to its front and has a short base. The second dorsal fin contains eleven or twelve soft rays and has a moderately long base, the front rays are the longest but are a little shorter than the longest spine in the first dorsal fin. The anal fin contains eleven soft rays and is almost parallel to the second dorsal fin and has a slightly longer-base. The rear margin of the caudal fin is truncate on the upper lobe and rounded on the lower lobe. The pectoral fins are moderate in size with a convex rear margin while the pelvic fins are long and have their bases below the middle of the pectoral fins and do not extend as far as the origin of the anal fin. The overall colour is brownish to reddish-brown marked with a dense brown speckling on the rear of the body becoming sparse towards the head. The first dorsal fin is dusky with a wide brown band just below the margin with this pattern reversed on the pectoral fins., The caudal fin is also dusky and has a row of dark streaks which form a dark submarginal band. The maximum published total length for this species is 30 cm (12 in), although 23 cm (9.1 in) is more typical.

== Distribution and habitat ==
The brownmargin flathead is endemic to the northern continental shelf of Australia where it has been recorded only from the Arafura and Timor Seas. It is a demersal species found at depths down between 1 and 110 m (3 ft 3 in and 360 ft 11 in) over soft substrates.

== Biology ==
The brownmargin flathead is thought to be a predator of smaller fishes.

== Fisheries ==
The brownmargin flathead is caught as bycatch in trawl fisheries.
