= Parascorpaena mcadamsi =

Conservation status
- Least Concern (IUCN 3.1)

Scientific classification
- Kingdom: Animalia
- Phylum: Chordata
- Class: Actinopterygii
- Order: Perciformes
- Family: Scorpaenidae
- Genus: Parascorpaena
- Species: P. mcadamsi

Binomial name
- Parascorpaena mcadamsi (Fowler, 1938)

Synonyms
- Parascorpaena macadamsi (Fowler, 1938); Parascorpaena mcdamsi (Fowler, 1938); Scorpaena mcadamsi Fowler, 1938

Species of scorpionfish

Parascorpaena mcadamsi, also called McAdam's scorpionfish, or most commonly the ocellate scorpionfish is a species of marine ray-finned fish belonging to the family Scorpaenidae, the scorpionfishes. They are native to the Indo-Pacific with habitats ranging from the eastern coast of Africa to the western coast of North America, though they are most abundant in the East Indies.

== Description ==
The ocellate scorpionfish is a small species of scorpionfish, reaching about 8.0 cm in length. They generally have mottled brown, orange, and white scales with twelve dorsal spines, eight to nine dorsal soft rays, three anal spines, and five anal soft rays along with a quadrangular, naked depression behind the eyes. Ocellate scorpionfish also feature sexual dimorphism, adult males will usually have a large black spot toward the rear of the dorsal fin between spines eight and ten. Females and juveniles will lack the spot or only feature a faint one.

== Behavior ==
Ocellate scorpionfish are generally more nocturnal, venturing out most often at night while remaining immersed within reefs during the day.
