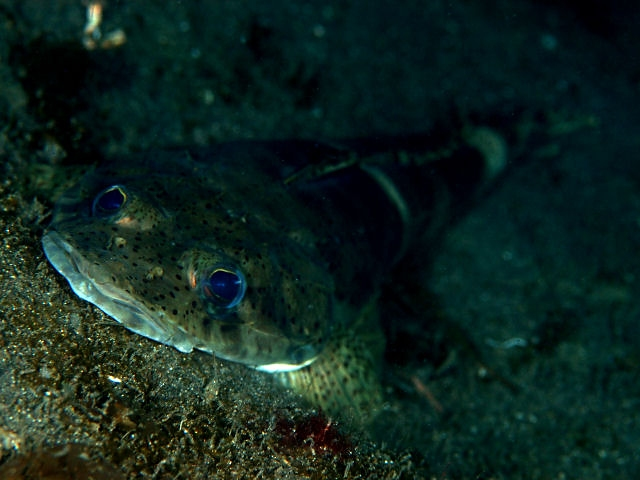

Conservation status
- Least Concern (IUCN 3.1)

Scientific classification
- Kingdom: Animalia
- Phylum: Chordata
- Class: Actinopterygii
- Order: Perciformes
- Family: Platycephalidae
- Genus: Cociella
- Species: C. crocodilus

Binomial name
- Cociella crocodilus (Cuvier, 1829)

Synonyms
- Platycephalus crocodilus Cuvier, 1829; Platycephalus crocodilus Tilesius, 1814; Cociella crocodilus (Tilesius, 1814); Cocius crocodila (Tilesius, 1814); Cocius crocodilus (Tilesius, 1814); Platycephalus guttatus Cuvier, 1829; Inegocia guttata (Cuvier, 1829); Platycephalus inermis D.S. Jordan & Evermann, 1902

= Crocodile flathead =

Species of fish

The crocodile flathead (Cociella crocodilus) is a species of marine ray-finned fish belonging to the family Platycephalidae, the flatheads. It is found in the western Pacific Ocean.

== Taxonomy ==
The crocodile flathead was first formally described as Platycephalus crocodilus in 1829 by the French zoologist Georges Cuvier, the species was not described from a type specimen, it was based on an illustration and so is an iconotype. In 1925 David Starr Jordan and Carl Leavitt Hubbs proposed a new genus, Cocius, and named P. crocodilus as its type species. However, this was preoccupied by an antlion named by the Spanish entomologist Longinos Navás in 1921, and in 1940 Gilbert Percy Whitley proposed a new name for this genus Cociella, a diminutive of Jordan and Hubbs original name.

The crocodile flathead was considered to have a wide Indo-Pacific distribution but in 1996 Leslie W. Knapp described three new species and removed a fourth C. punctata from being a synonym of C. crocodilus. As a consequence C. crocodilus sensu stricto was restricted to the western Pacific Ocean.

The specific name crocodilus means "crocodile", a reference to the flattened, crocodile like head and comes from an illustration caption in Tilesius 1814 but as Tilesius's name was printed in Cyrillic script, it is not available under the ICZN.

== Description ==
The crocodile flathead typically has 11 soft rays in the second dorsal fin and the anal fin. There are 2 spines on the suborbital ridge but no spines to the rear of the eye. The top spine on the preoperculum is relatively long almost extending to the margin of the operculum. There is usually no preorbital spine, although there is sometimes a very small one. There are between 74 and 91 diagonal scale rows above the lateral line. There are typically 7, although there may be one more or one less, gill rakers on the first gill arch. There are no flaps in between the opercula. The overall colour is brownish with a number small dark spots on the upper body and typically there are 4 or 5 dark brown bands crossing the back. The first dorsal fin has a wide black band near its margin with small black spots below that. The other fins have dark spots. This species attains a maximum published length of 50 cm (20 in).

== Distribution and habitat ==
The crocodile flathead was considered to have a wide Indo-Pacific distribution but the revised species is restricted to the western Pacific Ocean in Japan, China and Taiwan. It occurs from close to the shore down to 100 m (330 ft) on substrates of sand or mud. The larvae and juveniles occasionally enter brackish waters in mangroves, particularly the lower reaches.
