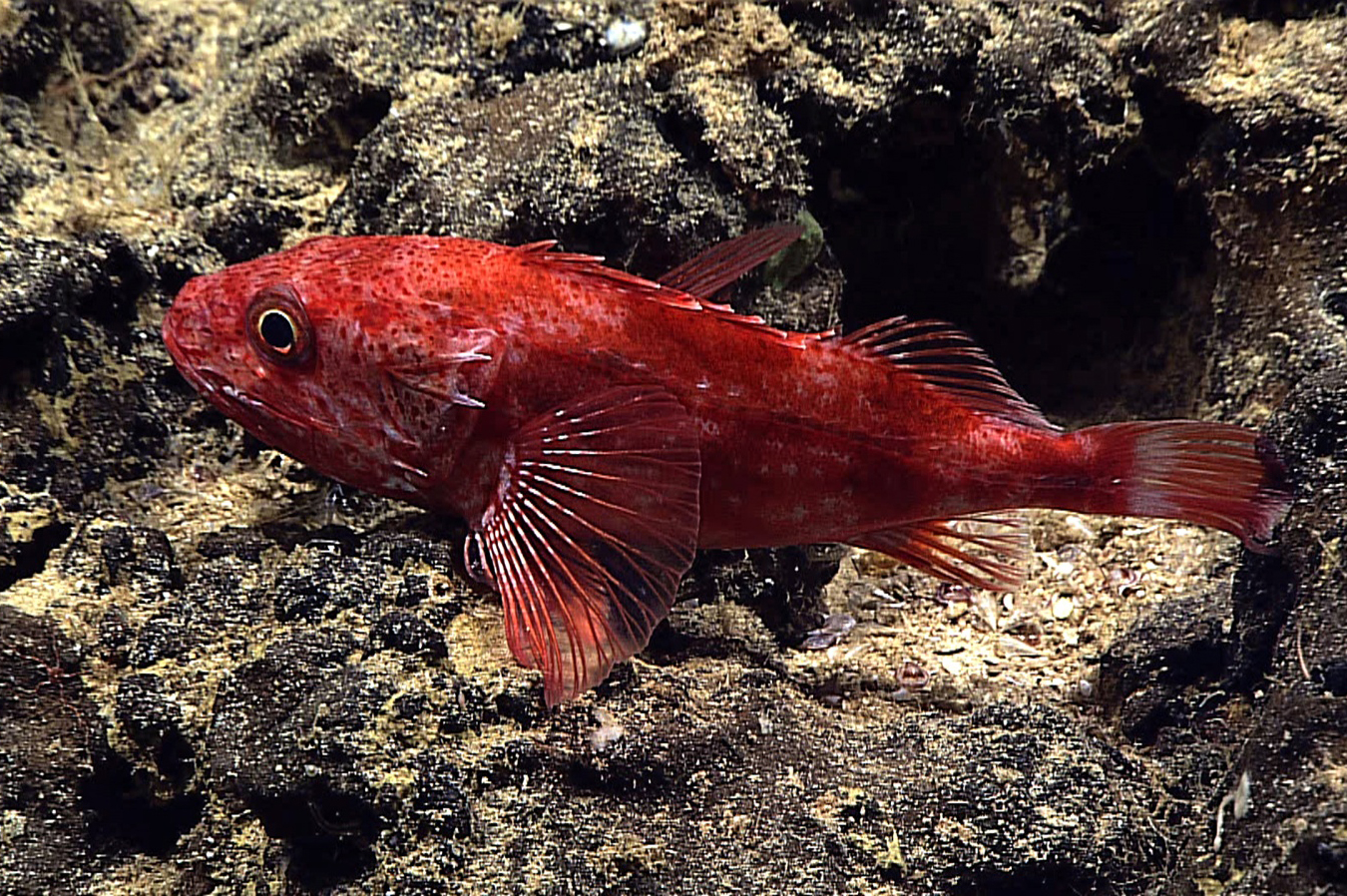
- Channelled rockfish Setarches guentheri

Conservation status
- Least Concern (IUCN 3.1)

Scientific classification
- Kingdom: Animalia
- Phylum: Chordata
- Class: Actinopterygii
- Order: Perciformes
- Family: Scorpaenidae
- Genus: Setarches
- Species: S. guentheri

Binomial name
- Setarches guentheri Johnson, 1862

Synonyms
- Setarches fidjiensis Günther, 1878; Setarches parmatus Goode, 1881; Bathysebastes albescens Döderlein, 1884; Sebastes albescens (Döderlein, 1884); Scorpaena remigera Gilbert & Cramer, 1897; Setarches remiger (Gilbert & Cramer, 1897); Setarches marleyi Fowler, 1935

= Channelled rockfish =

Genus of fishes

The channelled rockfish (Setarches guentheri), commonly known as the deepwater scorpionfish, is a marine ray-finned fish belonging to the subfamily Setarchinae, which is a part of the family Scorpaenidae. This species is found in various tropical and subtropical oceans and has a wide distribution.

== Taxonomy ==
The channelled rockfish was first formally described in 1862 by the English zoologist James Yate Johnson with the type locality given as Madeira. In his description Johnson placed the new species in the new monotypic genus Setarches. Subsequent workers added other species to this genus but in 1966 William N. Eschmeyer and Bruce B. Collette synonymised most of these with S. guentheri making Setarches consist only of this species and S. longimanus. This was later re-examined and 3 species were accepted as belonging to the genus Setarches: S. armata, S. guentheri and S. longimanus. A review in 2021 by Wada, Kai & Motomura resurrected the genus Lythrichthys, they type species of which was L. eulabes, one of the names Eschmeyer and Collette had regarded as synonymous with S. longimanus, placing S. cypho (which had also been treated as a synonym of Setarches longimanus) and S. longimanus and two newly described species in the resurrected genus Lythrichthys. S. armata is now considered to be a synonym of the flathead Thysanophrys armata. This left the channelled rockfish (Setarches guentheri) as the only species in the now monotypic Setarches. As of January 2022 this change has been accepted by Catalog of Fishes. The genus name Setarches was not explained by Johnson, it may be derived from saeta meaning "bristle" while the specific name honours Johnson's friend, the German-born British ichthyologist and herpetologist Albert Günther.

== Description ==
The channelled rockfish has a body which has a depth that is equivalent to 28-37% of its standard length, with the larger fish having less deep bodies than the smaller fish. There are 11-13 spines and 9-11 soft rays in the dorsal fin and the anal fin has 3 spines and 4-6 soft rays. The lateral line is almost continuous and is a trough covered by thin membranous scales, which are deciduous. The second spine on the preoperculum is longer and better developed than the first and the third which are of similar length. Living specimens are pinkish red to orange with reddish black spots on the head and body. In smaller individuals the colour is more reddish grey with black spots and the smallest fishes, c. 40 mm (1.6 in), have dark colouration concentrated in a patch above the pectoral fin and below the soft rayed part of the dorsal fin, with a smaller amount of dark colour on the caudal peduncle. This species grows to a maximum total length of 31.4 cm (12.4 in).

== Distribution and habitat ==
The channelled rockfish has the widest distribution of any scorpaenid. It has a circumglobal range on continental shelves in tropical and warm temperate oceans. In the eastern Atlantic it is found from Madeira south to South Africa, In the western Atlantic it is found from off southern Rhode Island south to northern Brazil, including the Gulf of Mexico. It occurs along the Pacific coasts of the Americas from southern British Columbia to Chile and across the Pacific and Indian Ocean to the east coast of Africa. Despite this wide range there is very little genetic difference between widely separated populations of the channelled rockfish. It is a benthopelagic species which has a depth range of 150 to 780 m (490 to 2,560 ft) over soft bottoms and with a water temperature between 5.5 to 12.5 °C (41.9 to 54.5 °F).

== Biology ==
The channelled rockfish live close to the bottom but tends to feed in the water column. It feeds predominantly on pelagic invertebrates. In the Gulf of Mexico, the diet is dominated by benthic crustaceans, like the shrimp and prawns in the genus Oplophorus and a variety of amphipods. The spines in the fins bear venom glands and they can envemonate humans if handled.

== Fisheries ==
Channelled rockfish are sometimes caught in fisheries in the Gulf of Mexico and are of slight commercial value in Mexico.
