= Chamaesphecia mysiniformis =

Scientific classification
- Kingdom: Animalia
- Phylum: Arthropoda
- Clade: Pancrustacea
- Class: Insecta
- Order: Lepidoptera
- Family: Sesiidae
- Genus: Chamaesphecia
- Subgenus: Scopulosphecia
- Species: C. mysiniformis

Binomial name
- Chamaesphecia mysiniformis (Boisduval, 1840)

Synonyms
- Sesia mysiniformis Boisduval, 1840; Chamaesphecia boisduvali Bartel, 1912; Chamaesphecia rondouana Le Cerf, 1922

Species of moth

Chamaesphecia mysiniformis is a moth of the family Sesiidae. It is native to the Iberian Peninsula, southern France, and northern Morocco, but has been introduced to Victoria, Australia in 1997.

The larvae feed on Marrubium vulgare, Marrubium alysson, Marrubium supinum, Ballota nigra, Ballota hirsuta, Stachys germanica, Stachys ocymastrum, Stachys circinata and Sideritis montana.
