= S. armata =

S. armata may refer to:

- Scorpaenopsella armata, a marine fish species
- Stephensia armata, a moth species found in Belize

== See also ==
- Armata (disambiguation)
