= Frost flower =

Thin layer of ice extruded from a plant

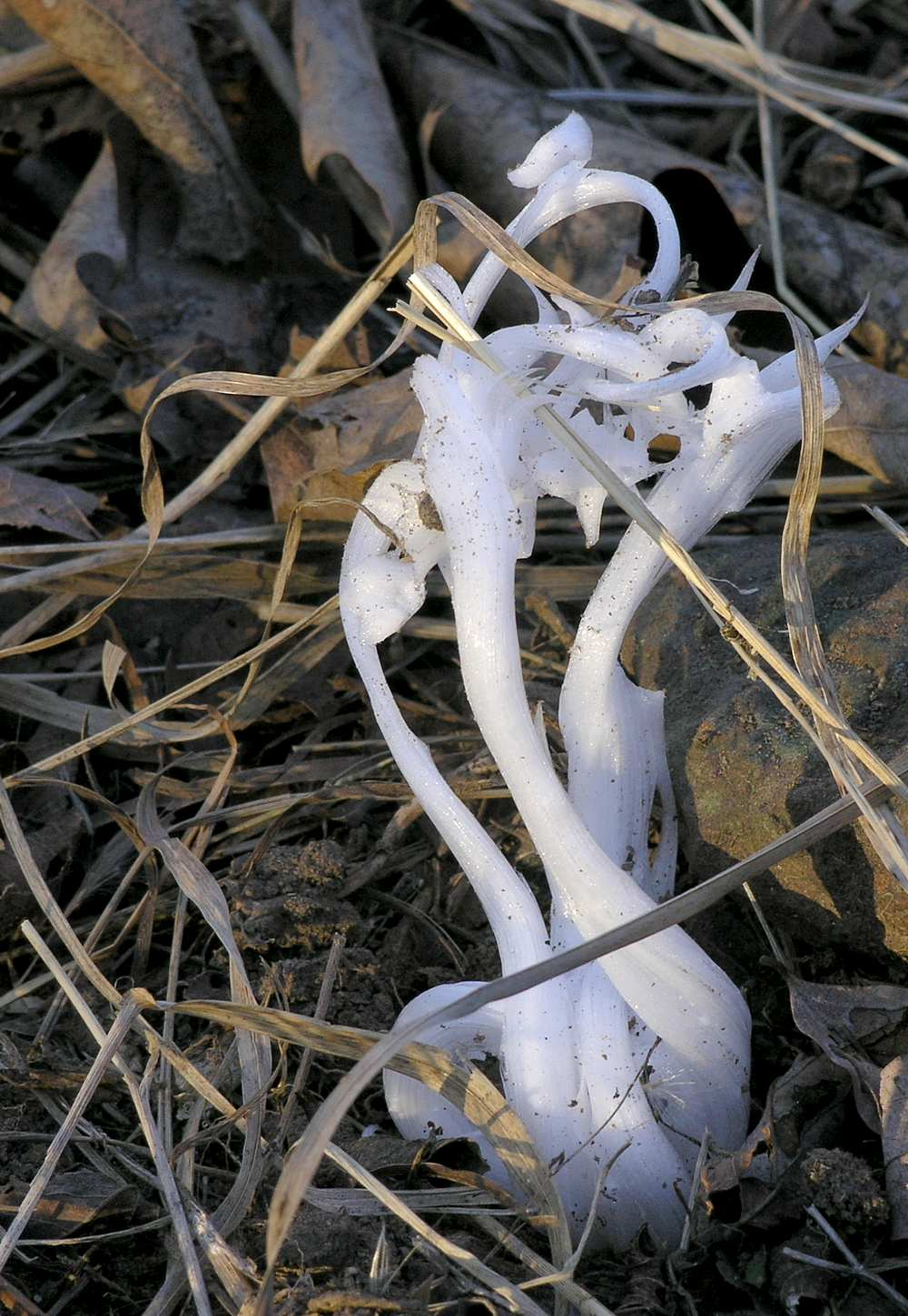
Frost flower in the Ozark Mountains, USA

A frost flower or ice flower is formed when thin layers of ice are extruded from long-stemmed plants in autumn or early winter. The thin layers of ice are often formed into exquisite patterns, curling into "petals" which resemble flowers.

== Types ==
Frost flower formations are also referred to as frost faces, ice castles, ice blossoms, or crystallofolia.

Types of frost flowers include needle ice, frost pillars, or frost columns, extruded from pores in the soil, and ice ribbons, rabbit frost, or rabbit ice, extruded from linear fissures in plant stems. The term "ice flower" is also used as synonym for ice ribbons, but it may be used to describe the unrelated phenomenon of window frost as well.

== Formation ==
The formation of frost flowers is dependent on a freezing weather condition occurring when the ground is not already frozen. The sap in the stem of the plants will expand (water expands when frozen), causing long, thin cracks to form along the length of the stem. Water is then drawn through these cracks via capillary action and freezes upon contact with the air. As more water is drawn through the cracks it pushes the thin ice layers further from the stem, causing a thin "petal" to form.

The petals of frost flowers are very delicate and will break when touched. They usually melt or sublime when exposed to sunlight and are usually visible in the early morning or in shaded areas.

Examples of plants that often form frost flowers are white crownbeard (Verbesina virginica), commonly called frostweed, yellow ironweed (Verbesina alternifolia), dittany (Cunila origanoides), Helianthemum canadense, and Isodon henryi.

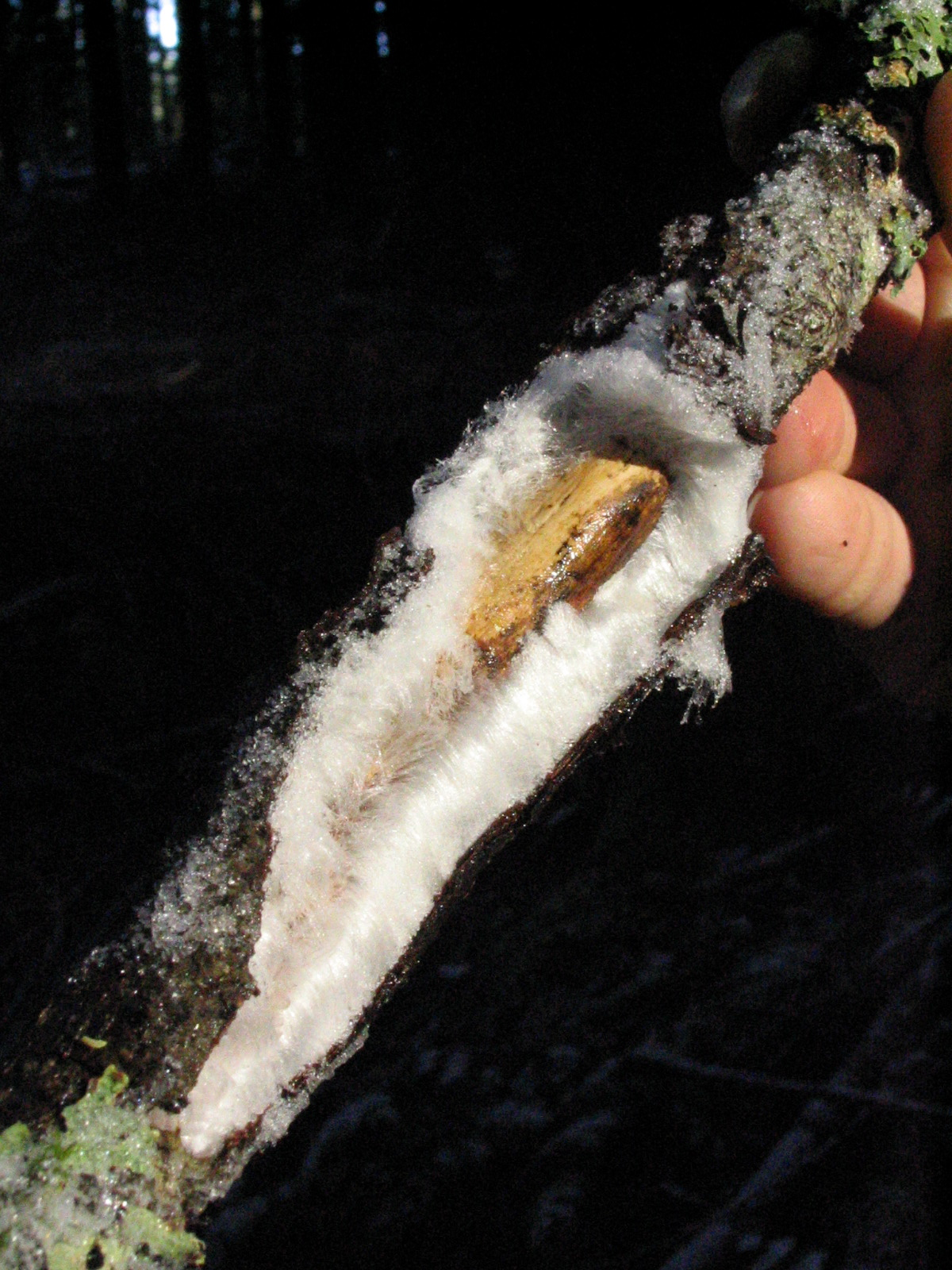
Example of the hydraulic power of capillary freezing

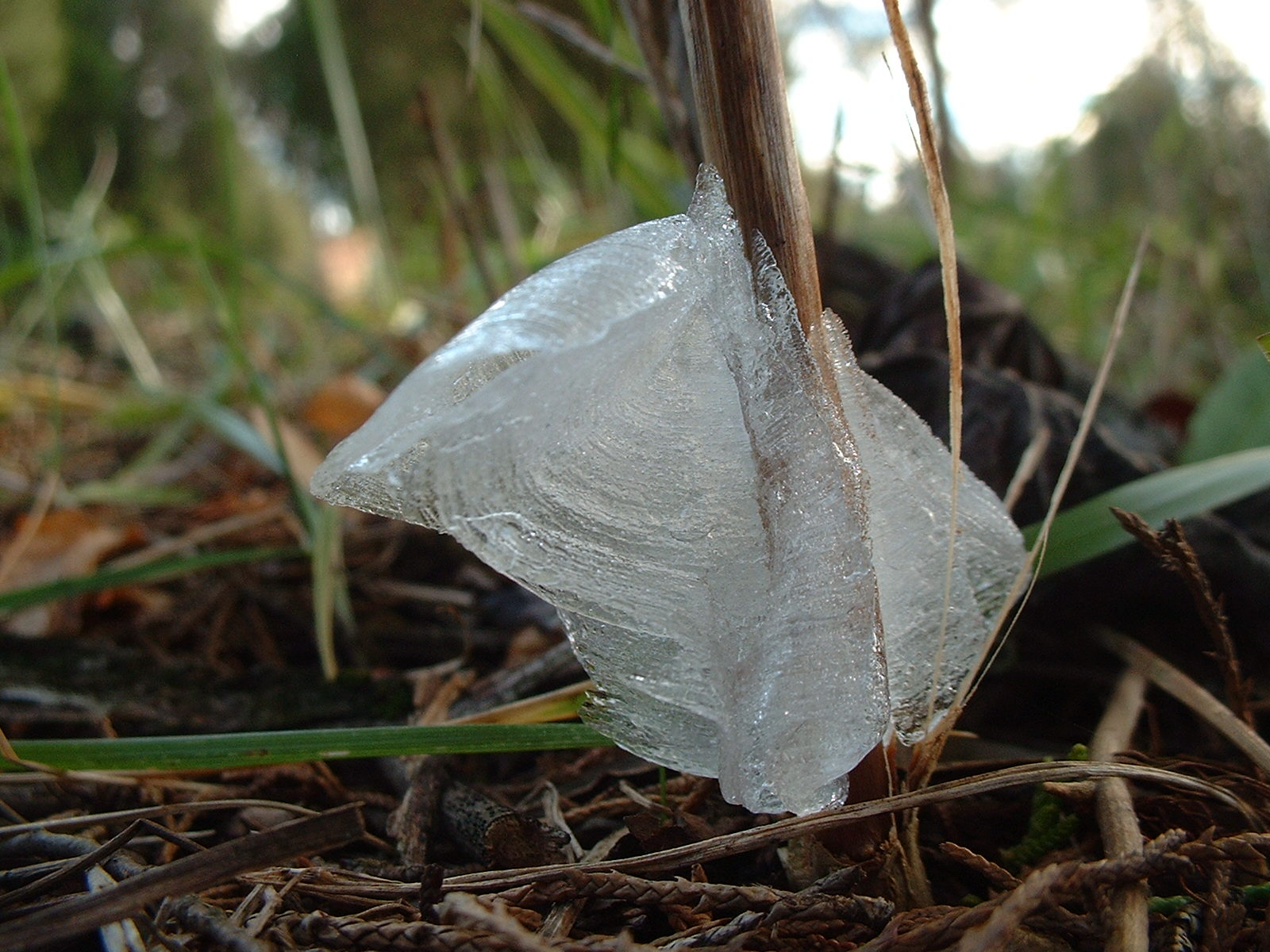
Frost flower closeup

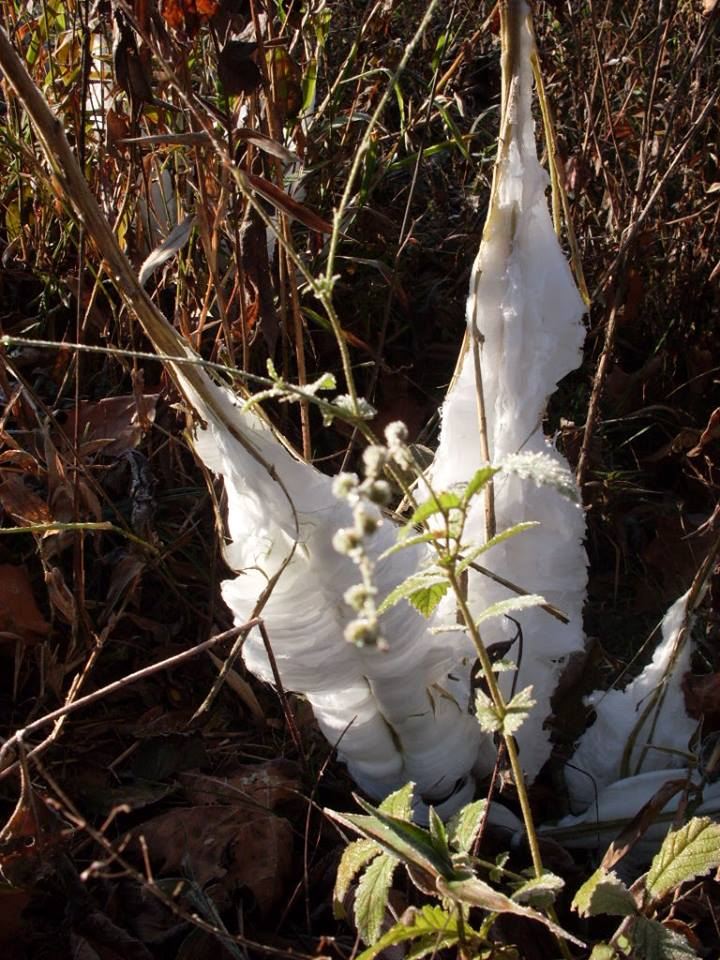
Frost flower on a yellow ironweed stem in southern Missouri

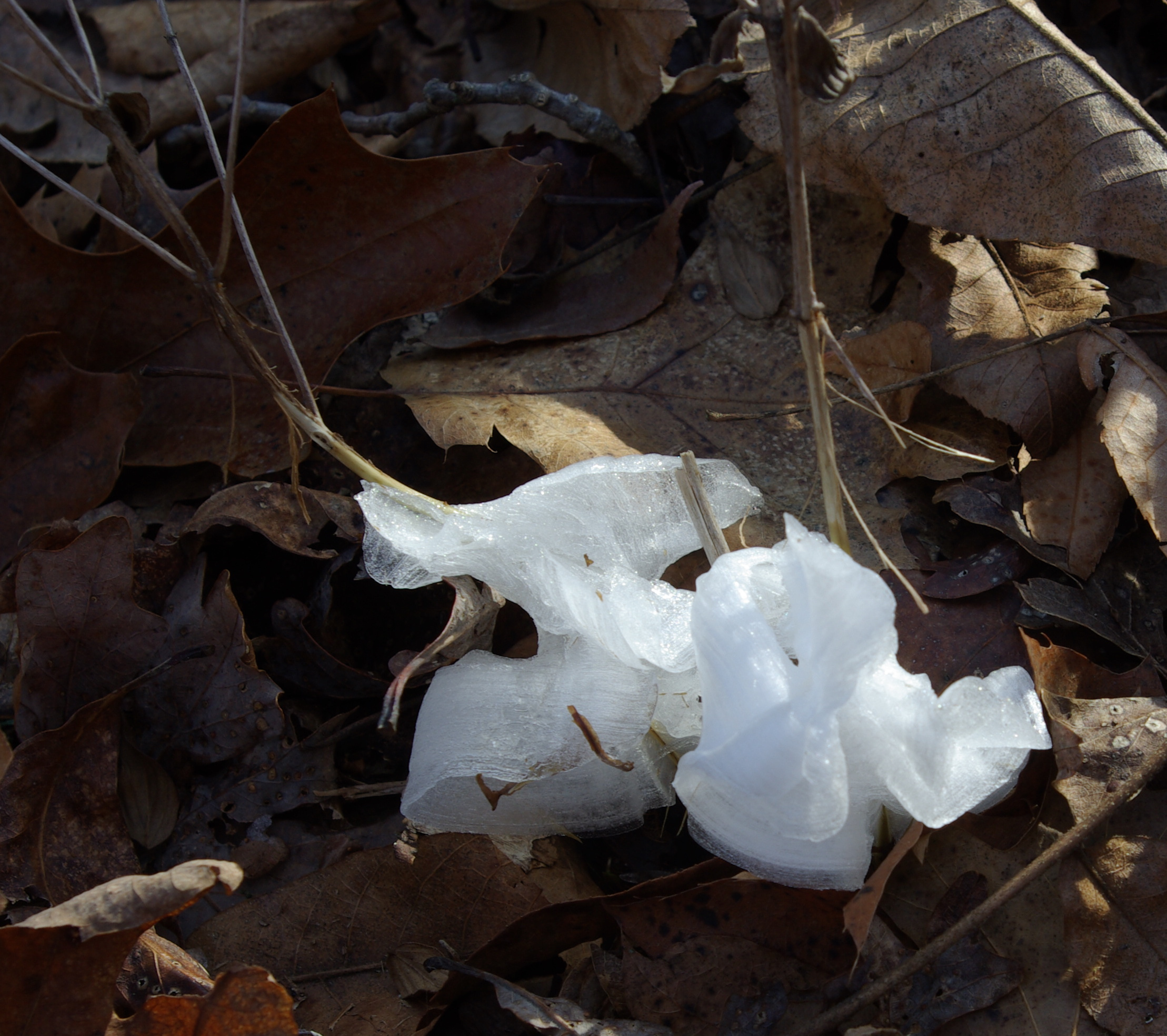
Frost flower on common dittany (Cunila origanoides) in NW Arkansas

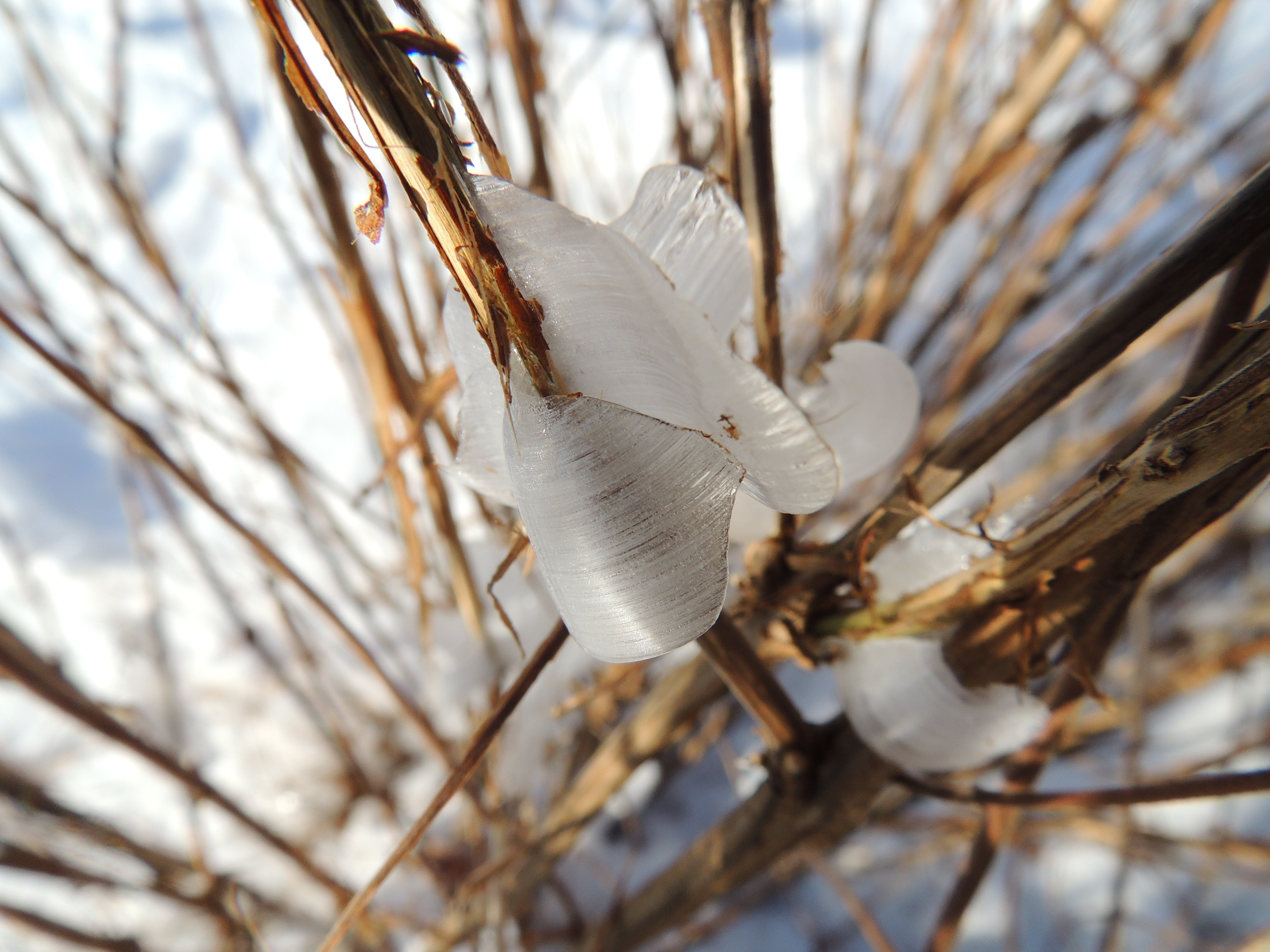
Ice formation on Isodon henryi exuded far from the ground.

== See also ==
- Hair ice
- Needle ice
- Frostweed
