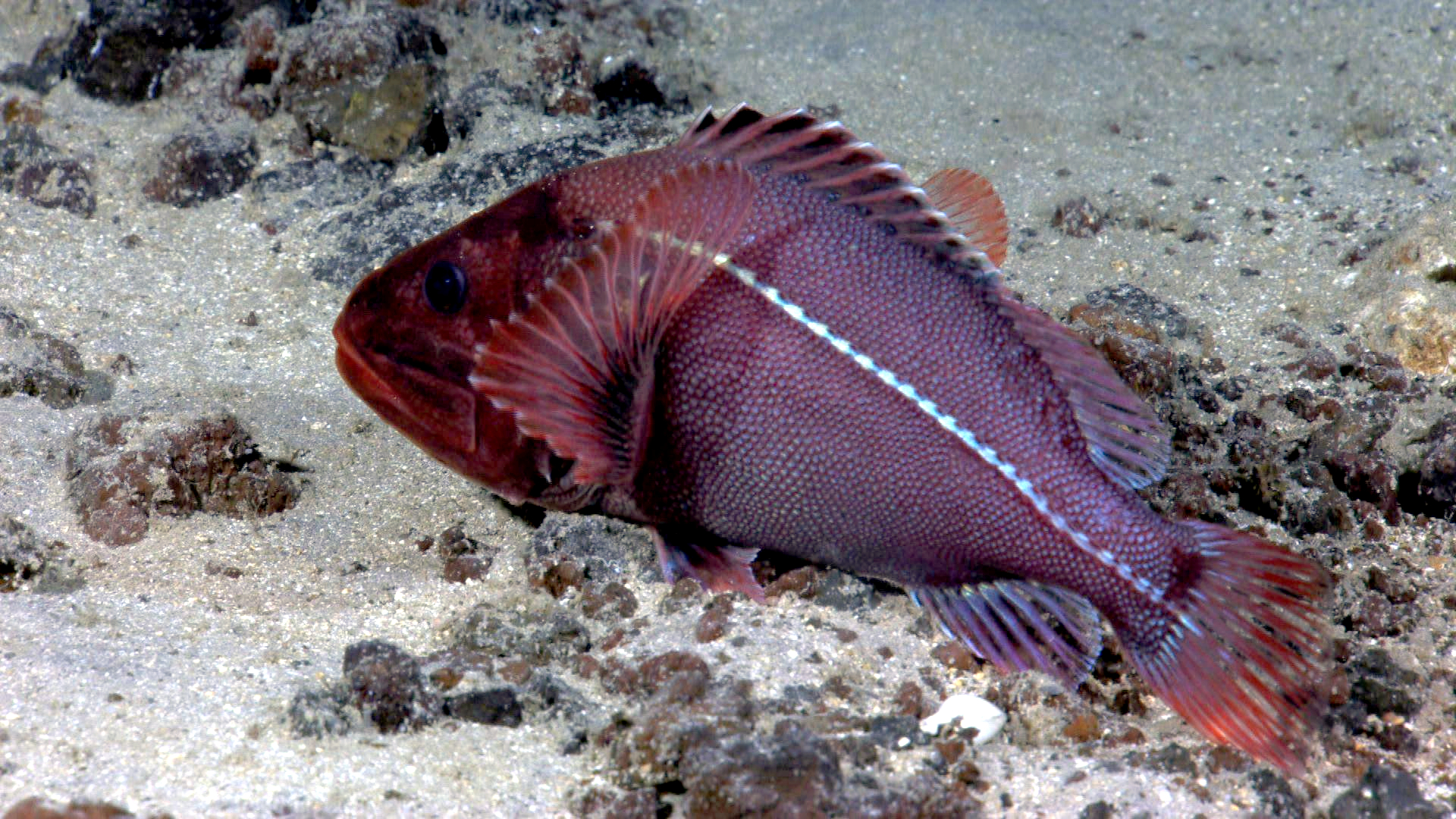

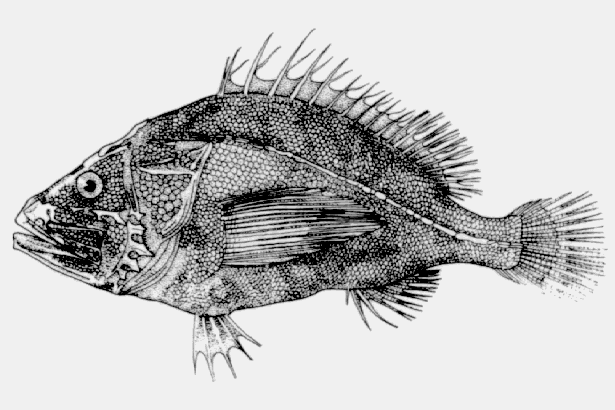

Scientific classification
- Kingdom: Animalia
- Phylum: Chordata
- Class: Actinopterygii
- Order: Perciformes
- Family: Scorpaenidae
- Genus: Ectreposebastes
- Species: E. imus

Binomial name
- Ectreposebastes imus Garman, 1899

= Ectreposebastes imus =

Species of fish

Ectreposebastes imus, the black rockfish or black scorpionfish, is a marine ray-finned fish belonging to the subfamily Setarchinae, which is a part of the family Scorpaenidae.

== Distribution ==
The black scorpionish is found in the tropical and subtropical waters of the Atlantic, Indian, and Pacific Oceans.
