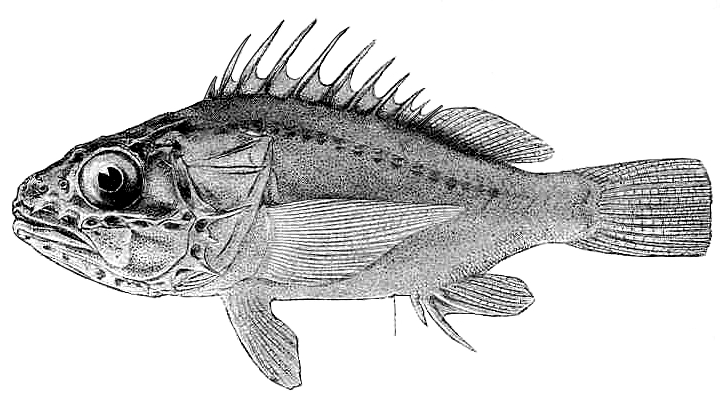
- Lythrichthys eulabes

Scientific classification
- Kingdom: Animalia
- Phylum: Chordata
- Class: Actinopterygii
- Order: Perciformes
- Family: Scorpaenidae
- Subfamily: Setarchinae
- Genus: Lythrichthys; Jordan & Starks, 1904

Type species
- Lythrichthys eulabes Jordan & Starks, 1904

Synonyms
- Scorpaenella Fowler, 1938

= Lythrichthys =

Genus of fishes

Lythrichthys, the red deepwater scorpionfishes, is a genus of marine ray-finned fish, belonging to the subfamily Setarchinae, the deep-sea bristly scorpionfishes, part of the family Scorpaenidae. They are native to the Pacific Ocean.

== Taxonomy ==
Lythrichthys was first described as a genus in 1904 by the American ichthyologists David Starr Jordan and Edwin Chapin Starks as a monotypic genus for Lythrichthys eulabes which they described with a type locality given as off Ose Point in Suruga Bay in Japan. L. eulabes was later placed in the genus Setarches and Lythrichthys became a synonym of that taxon. However, in 2021 Wada, Kai & Motomura resurrected the genus, added L. cypho (which had been treated as a synonym ofSetarches longimanus), as well as L. longimanus, and described two new species. This left the channelled rockfish (Setarches guentheri) as the only species in the now monotypic Setarches As of January 2022 this change has been accepted by Catalog of Fishes. The genus name is a compound of lythrum, which means "gore", alluding to red colour of the body of living L. eulabes, and ichthys, Greek for "fish".

== Species ==
The following 5 species are classified within the genus Lythrichthys:

- Lythrichthys cypho (Fowler, 1938) (Dwarf red deepwater scorpionfish)
- Lythrichthys dentatus Wada, Kai & Motomura 2021 (Gap-toothed red deepwater scorpionfish)
- Lythrichthys eulabes Jordan & Starks 1904 (Jordan's red deepwater scorpionfish)
- Lythrichthys grahami Wada, Kai & Motomura 2021 (Graham's red deepwater scorpionfish)
- Lythrichthys longimanus (Alcock 1894) (Red deepwater scorpionfish)

== Characteristics ==
Lythrichthys deepwater red scorpionfishes are characterised by typically having 3 spines and 5 soft rays in the anal fin, although there may be as few as 4 or as many as 6 anal soft rays/ they have 7-12 predorsal scales. The body depth at the origin of the pelvic fin is 29.1% to 38.6% of the standard length and the interorbital area has a width at the vertical midline of eye of 8.1% to 12.9% of the standard length. The snout, dorsal and ventral surface of head have no scales. No less than 75% of the lateral surface of premaxilla is covered by a well-developed lip. the first lacrimal spine is well developed and is roughly the same length as the second and third spines. There are 5 preopercular spines, with the second being much less well developed than the first and third which are also much longer than the fourth and fifth spines which are subequal in length. The tip of the first lacrimal spine just extends over the upper lip< the scales on the thorax and abdomen are clearly embedded in the skin. they have a well developed swim bladder.

== Distribution ==
Lythrichthys deepwater red scorpionfishes are found in the Indo-West Pacific as far north as Japan and south to Australia and west as far as Fiji.
