= Lythrichthys longimanus =

Scientific classification
- Kingdom: Animalia
- Phylum: Chordata
- Class: Actinopterygii
- Order: Perciformes
- Family: Scorpaenidae
- Genus: Lythrichthys
- Species: L. longimanus

Binomial name
- Lythrichthys longimanus (Alcock 1894)

Synonyms
- Setarches longimanus (Alcock, 1894)

Species of ray-finned fish

Lythrichthys longimanus, the red deepwater scorpionfish, is a marine ray-finned fish belonging to the subfamily Setarchinae, which is a part of the family Scorpaenidae.

== Taxonomy ==
The red deepwater scorpionfish was formerly assigned to the genus Setarches. However, a 2021 study demonstrated it to be referrable to the newly resurrected genus Lythrichthys.
