= Cunial =

Cunial is a surname of Italian origin. Notable people with the surname include:

- Ettore Cunial (1905–2005), Italian prelate
- Sara Cunial (born 1979), Italian politician
- Amie Cunial (born 1992), Italian Assistant Manager

== See also ==
- Cunila
