= Stephensia calpella =

Scientific classification
- Domain: Eukaryota
- Kingdom: Animalia
- Phylum: Arthropoda
- Class: Insecta
- Order: Lepidoptera
- Family: Elachistidae
- Genus: Stephensia
- Species: S. calpella

Binomial name
- Stephensia calpella (Walsingham, 1908)

Synonyms
- Perittia calpella Walsingham, 1908; Perittia bullatella Chrétien, 1908

Species of moth

Stephensia calpella is a moth of the family Elachistidae. It is found in Spain and North Africa.

The wingspan is about 8 mm.

The larvae feed on Ballota hirsuta. They mine the leaves of their host plant. Larvae can be found from April to May.
