= Stephensia abbreviatella =

Scientific classification
- Domain: Eukaryota
- Kingdom: Animalia
- Phylum: Arthropoda
- Class: Insecta
- Order: Lepidoptera
- Family: Elachistidae
- Genus: Stephensia
- Species: S. abbreviatella

Binomial name
- Stephensia abbreviatella (Stainton, 1851)

Synonyms
- List: Elachista abbreviatella Stainton, 1851; Dyselachista myosotivora Müller-Rutz, 1937; Scirtopoda myosotivora; Elachista maxima Hofner, 1897

Species of moth

Stephensia abbreviatella is a moth of the family Elachistidae. It is found in France, Germany, Poland, the Czech Republic, Slovakia, Austria, Romania and Turkey.

The wingspan is 9–11 mm.

The larvae feed on wood forget-me-not (Myosotis sylvatica). They mine the leaves of their host plant. After overwintering, the larvae make several new mines. Pupation takes place outside of the mine, in the soil. Larvae can be found from September to May of the following year.
