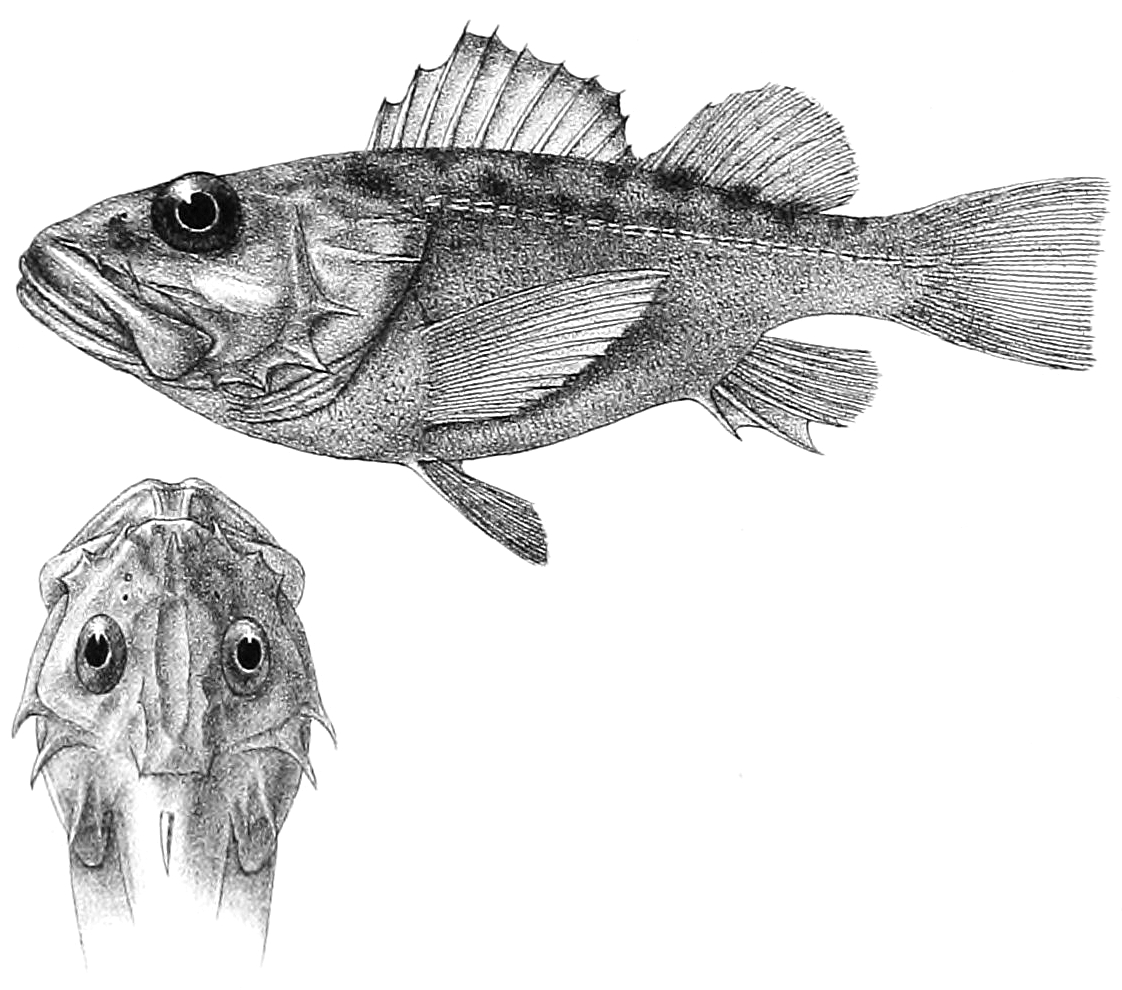
- Lioscorpius longiceps

Scientific classification
- Kingdom: Animalia
- Phylum: Chordata
- Class: Actinopterygii
- Order: Perciformes
- Family: Scorpaenidae
- Subfamily: Setarchinae
- Genus: Lioscorpius; Günther, 1880

Type species
- Lioscorpius longiceps Günther, 1880

= Lioscorpius =

Genus of fishes

Lioscorpius is a genus of marine ray-finned fish, belonging to the subfamily Setarchinae, the deep-sea bristly scorpionfishes, part of the family Scorpaenidae. They are native to the western Pacific Ocean.

== Taxonomy ==
Lioscorpiusas formally described as a genus in 1880 by the German-born British ichthyologist Albert Günther when he described what was then its only species, L. longiceps, from the Kai Islands in the Banda Sea in Indonesia. The genus name Lioscorpius is a compound of lio, meaning "smooth", Gunther described the head of L. longiceps "with scarcely any ridges or spines", and scorpius which means "scorpion", indicating that this is a scorpionfish.

== Species ==
There are currently two recognized species in this genus:

- Lioscorpius longiceps Günther, 1880 (Slender scorpionfish)
- Lioscorpius trifasciatus Last, Yearsley & Motomura, 2005 (Tripleband scorpionfish)

== Characteristics ==
Lioscorpius scorpionfishes have a preorbital bone which has a very small first spine. A long projection above the preorbital covers its articulating surface. The rearmost 2-3 spines in the dorsal fin are small and are often embedded in the skin. They have a well developed swimbladded and a large gas gland. They have more slender bodies than related genera within the Setarchinae, the depth being around a quarter of the standard length, they also have a thin space between the eyes. The two species within the genus are distinguished by L. longiceps having 2 spines and 6 soft trays in its anal fin and L. trifasciatus having 3 spines and 5 soft rays in its anal fin.

== Distribution and habitat ==
Lioscorpius scorpionfishes are found in the western Pacific from Japan south to Australia, including Vanuatu, New Caledonia and Fiji. They are described as bathydemersal (L. longiceps) or benthopelagic (L. trifasciatus) and are found at depths of between 180 and 410 m (590 and 1,350 ft).
