= Stephensia major =

Scientific classification
- Domain: Eukaryota
- Kingdom: Animalia
- Phylum: Arthropoda
- Class: Insecta
- Order: Lepidoptera
- Family: Elachistidae
- Genus: Stephensia
- Species: S. major

Binomial name
- Stephensia major (Kearfott, 1907)

Synonyms
- Antispila major Kearfott, 1907

Species of moth

Stephensia major is a moth of the family Elachistidae. It was described by William D. Kearfott in 1907. It is found in North America.
