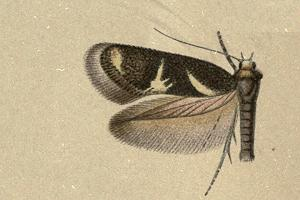

Scientific classification
- Domain: Eukaryota
- Kingdom: Animalia
- Phylum: Arthropoda
- Class: Insecta
- Order: Lepidoptera
- Family: Elachistidae
- Genus: Stephensia
- Species: S. cedronellae

Binomial name
- Stephensia cedronellae (Walsingham, 1908)

Synonyms
- Perittia cedronellae Walsingham, 1908; Perittia bystropogonis Walsingham, 1908; Perittia lavandulae Walsingham, 1908

= Stephensia cedronellae =

Species of moth

Stephensia cedronellae is a moth of the family Elachistidae. It is found on the Canary Islands.

The wingspan is 6.5–7 mm. The forewings are tawny fuscous, with some faint pale sprinkling. The hindwings are dark grey.

The larvae feed on Bystropogon origanifolius, Bystropogon plumosus, Calamintha, Cedronella canariensis, Lavandula canariensis, Lavandula stoechas, Mentha and Micromeria. They mine the leaves of their host plant. Larvae can be found from January to March.
