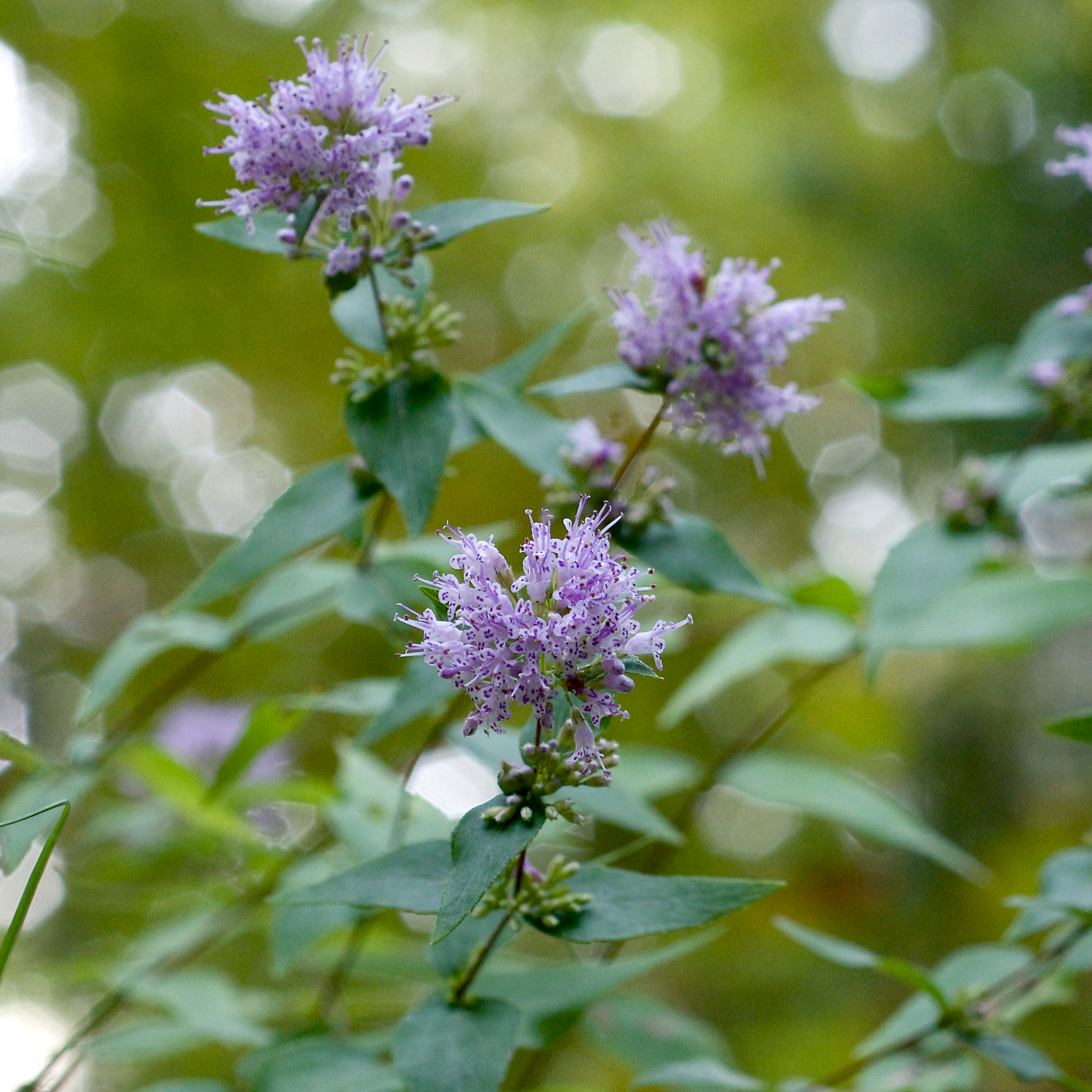

Conservation status
- Secure (NatureServe)

Scientific classification
- Kingdom: Plantae
- Clade: Tracheophytes
- Clade: Angiosperms
- Clade: Eudicots
- Clade: Asterids
- Order: Lamiales
- Family: Lamiaceae
- Genus: Cunila
- Species: C. origanoides

Binomial name
- Cunila origanoides (L.) Britton

Synonyms
- Cunila mariana L.; Hedyosmos origanoides (L.) Kuntze; Mappia origanoides (L.) House; Satureja origanoides L.; Ziziphora mariana (L.) Roem. & Schult.

= Cunila origanoides =

Species of flowering plant

Cunila origanoides, with the common names stone mint, frost mint, dittany, and American dittany, is a perennial late-summer-flowering subshrub with small purple flowers that is native to the central and eastern United States. It belongs to the mint family (Lamiaceae) and is the only species in the genus Cunila native to the United States. It grows in habitats such as dry forests and the thin soil around rock outcrops. This species has historically been cultivated for use as a medicinal herb, tea, and ornamental plant.

== Description ==
Cunila origanoides is a low, shrublike plant with square, stiff, branching stems, growing 15–46 cm (0.5–1.5 ft) tall. In the spring, the stems are purple, turning red when the plant is in bloom, then brown and woody in the fall. Leaves are opposite and measure 2–4 cm (0.7–1.5 in) long. They are sessile or have very short petioles. They are lanceolate, ovate, or ovate-cordate, with finely toothed margins. When crushed, the leaves give off a strong thyme aroma.

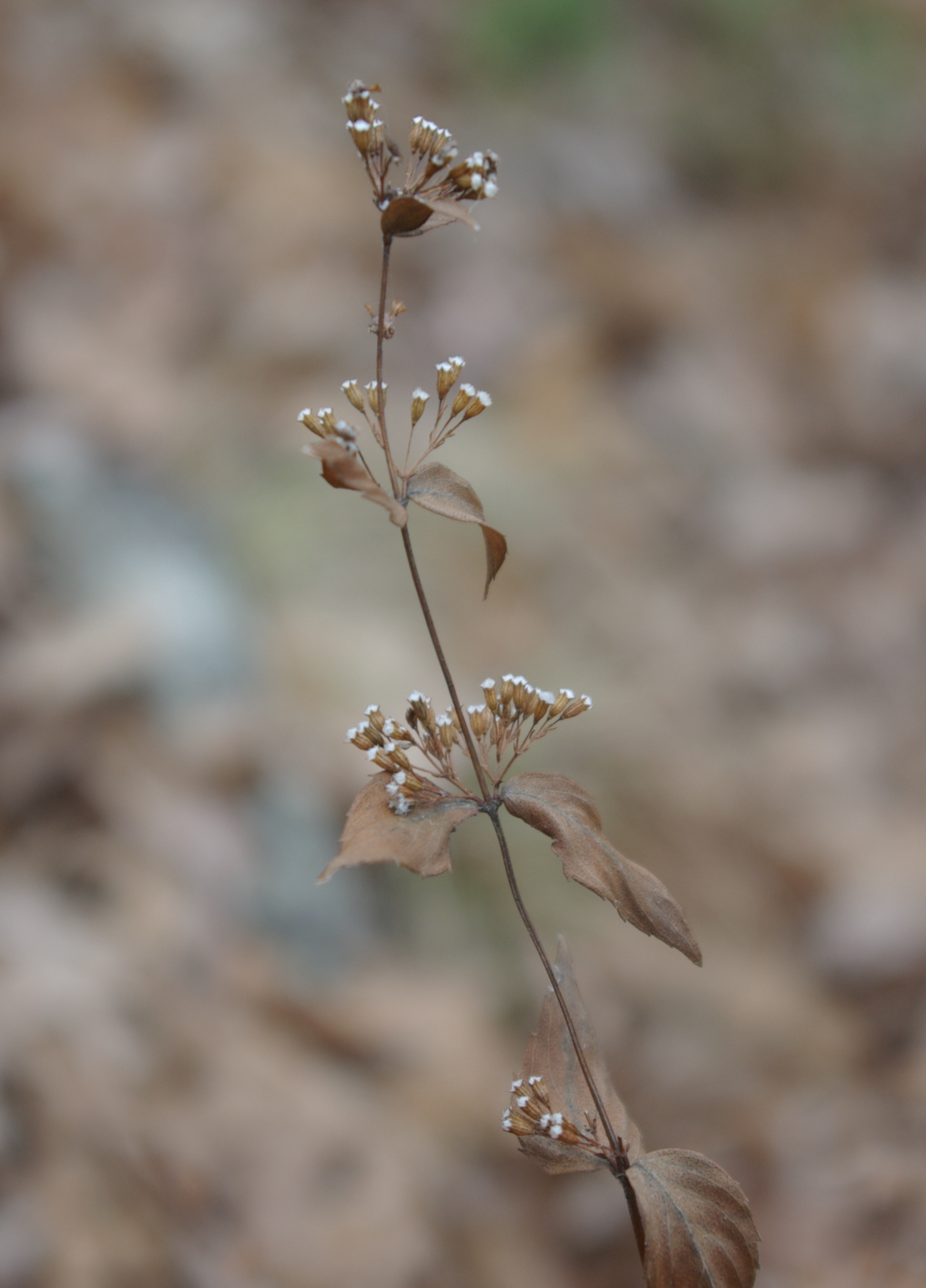
American dittany in December

Small purple or lavender flowers, measuring up to 0.8 cm (0.3 in) long, appear in clusters of cymes at the end of branches. The flowers are tubular with 4 flared lobes. The 2 stamens and the style are twice as long as the corolla and stick out noticeably.

== Distribution and habitat ==
The plant is native in the United States from Texas to the west and south, Illinois and New York to the north, and North Carolina to the east. It is found in dry areas in upland rocky woodlands, rocky slopes and ridges, and semi-shaded areas of sandstone cliffs.

== Ecology ==
The plant blooms in the late summer and fall, and butterflies, bees, and other insects are attracted to the flowers. It is a host plant for the moth Stephensia cunilae. C. origanoides is one of the few plants that are known to produce frost flowers.

== Uses ==
The leaves of C. origanoides, either fresh or dried, have been used for making tea with a pleasant, thyme flavor. The tea can also be used for headaches, colds, and fevers, as well as for inducing menstruation and perspiration. Cunila oil, an essential oil, can be used as an antiseptic, aromatic and stimulant.

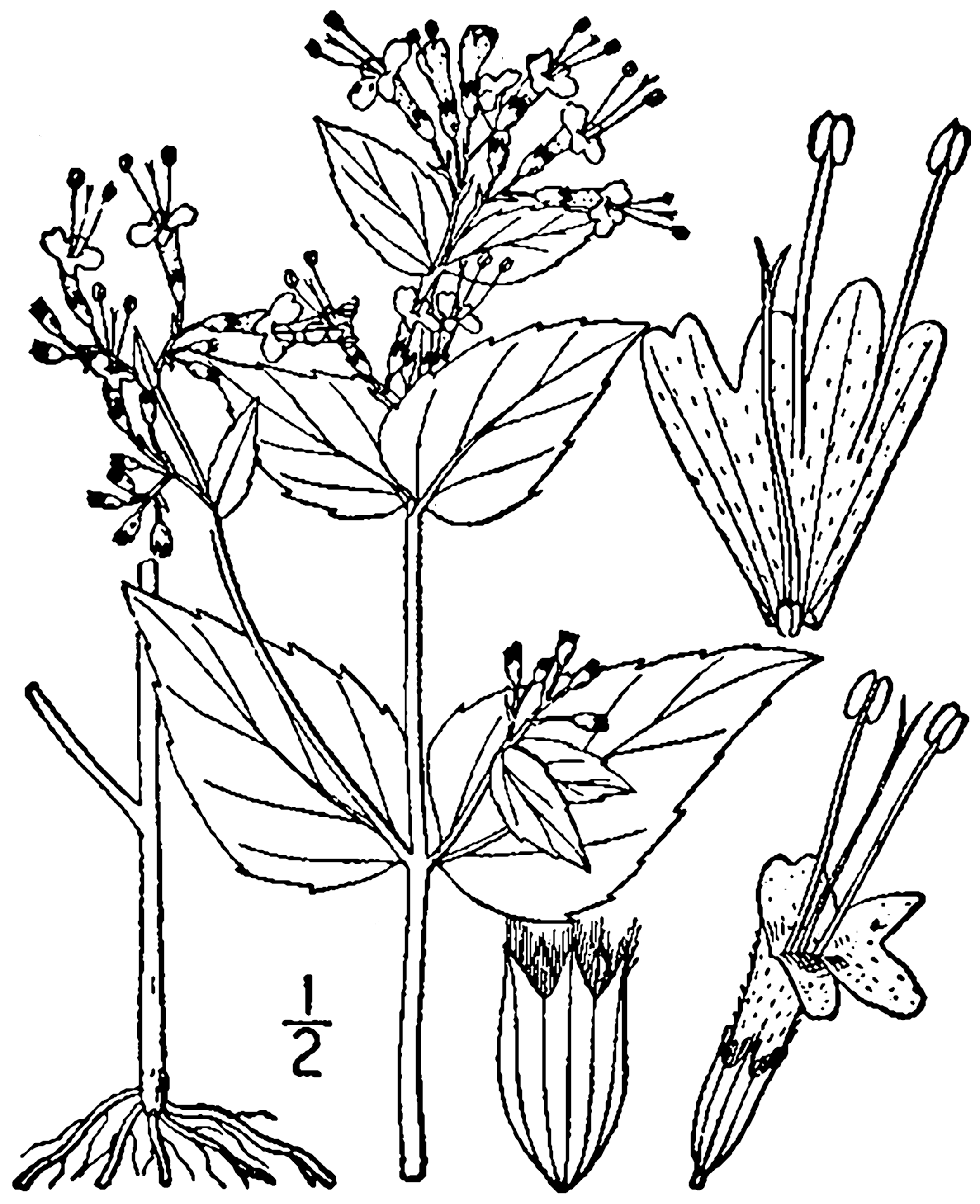

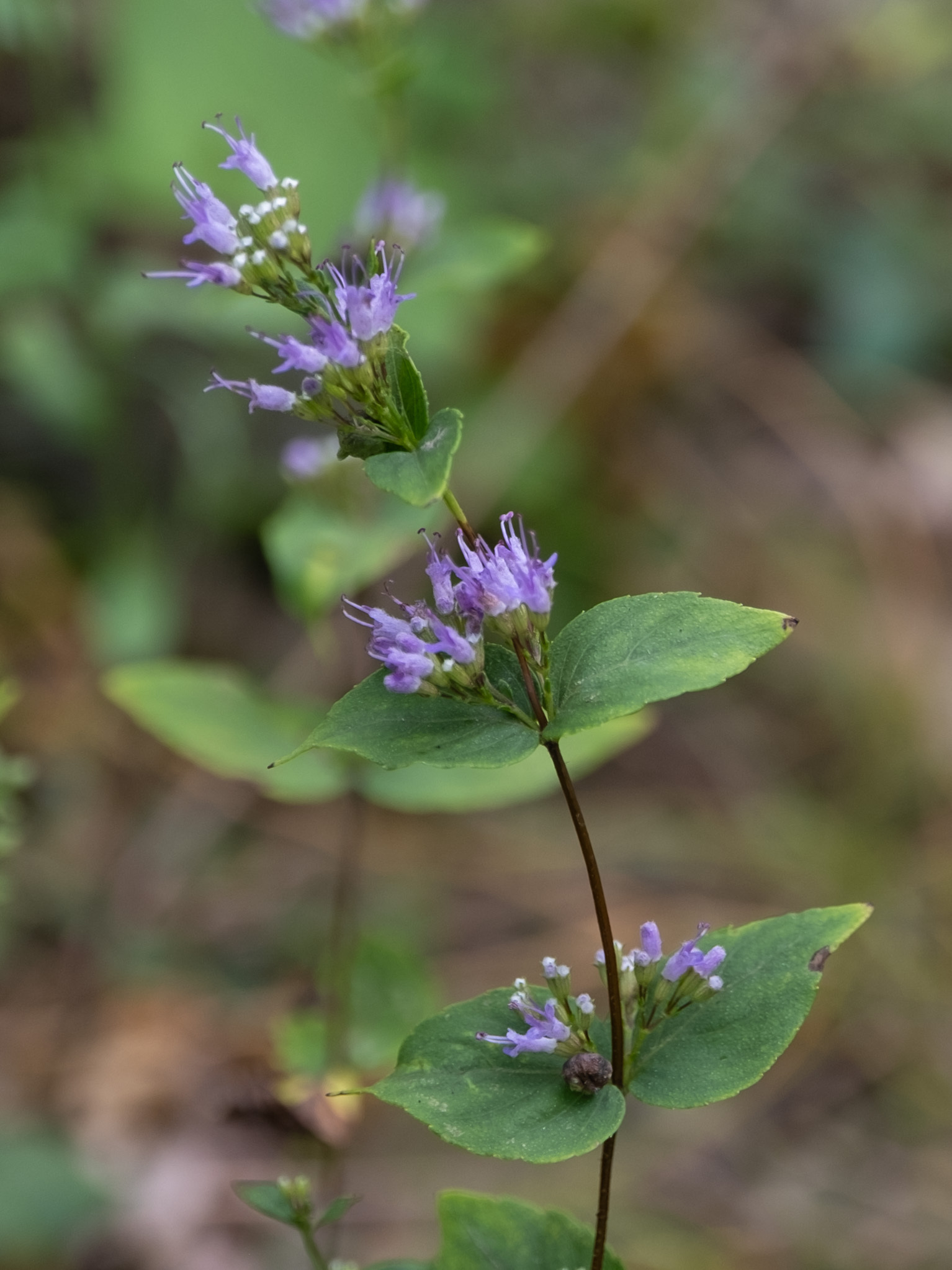

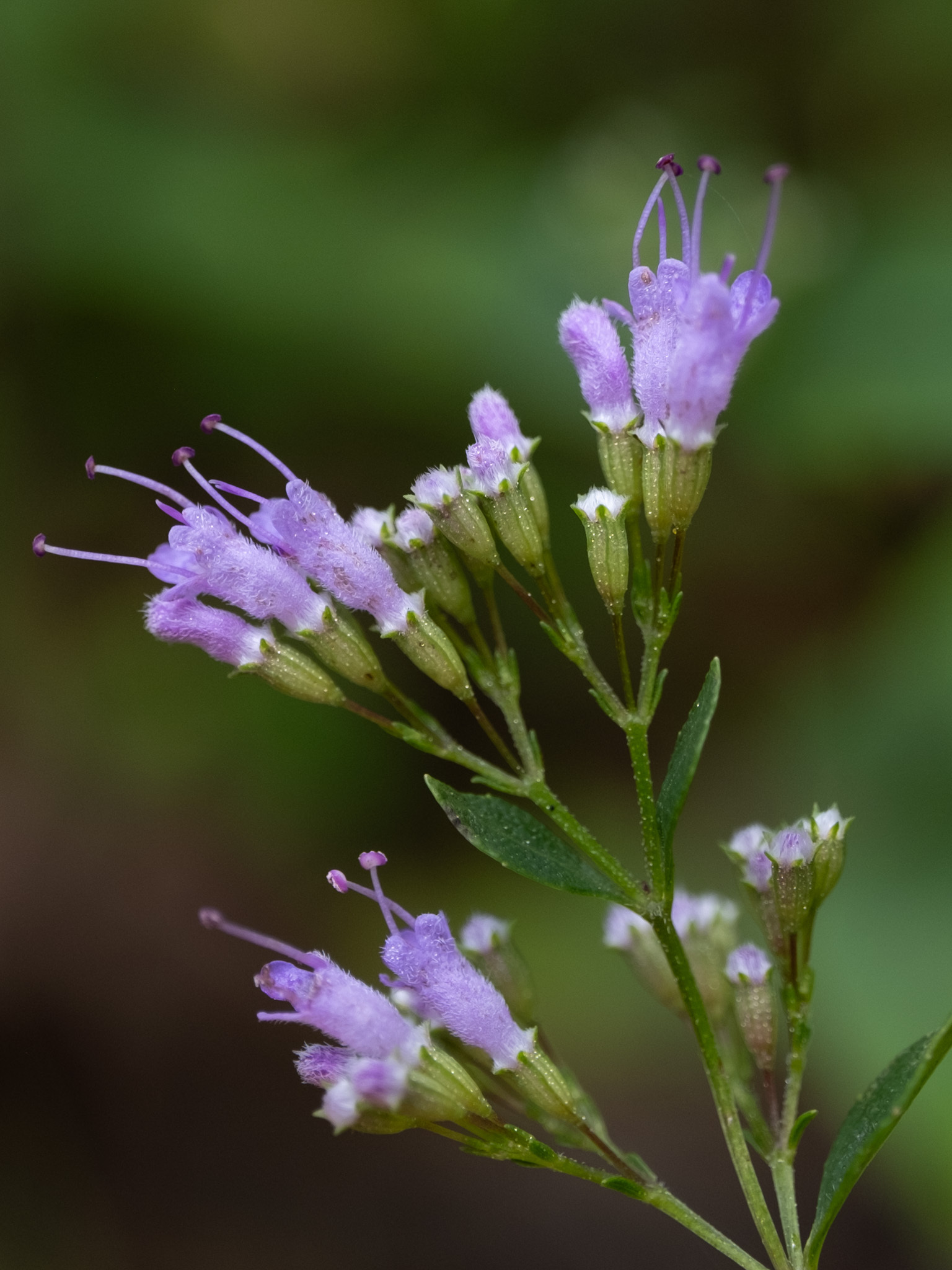

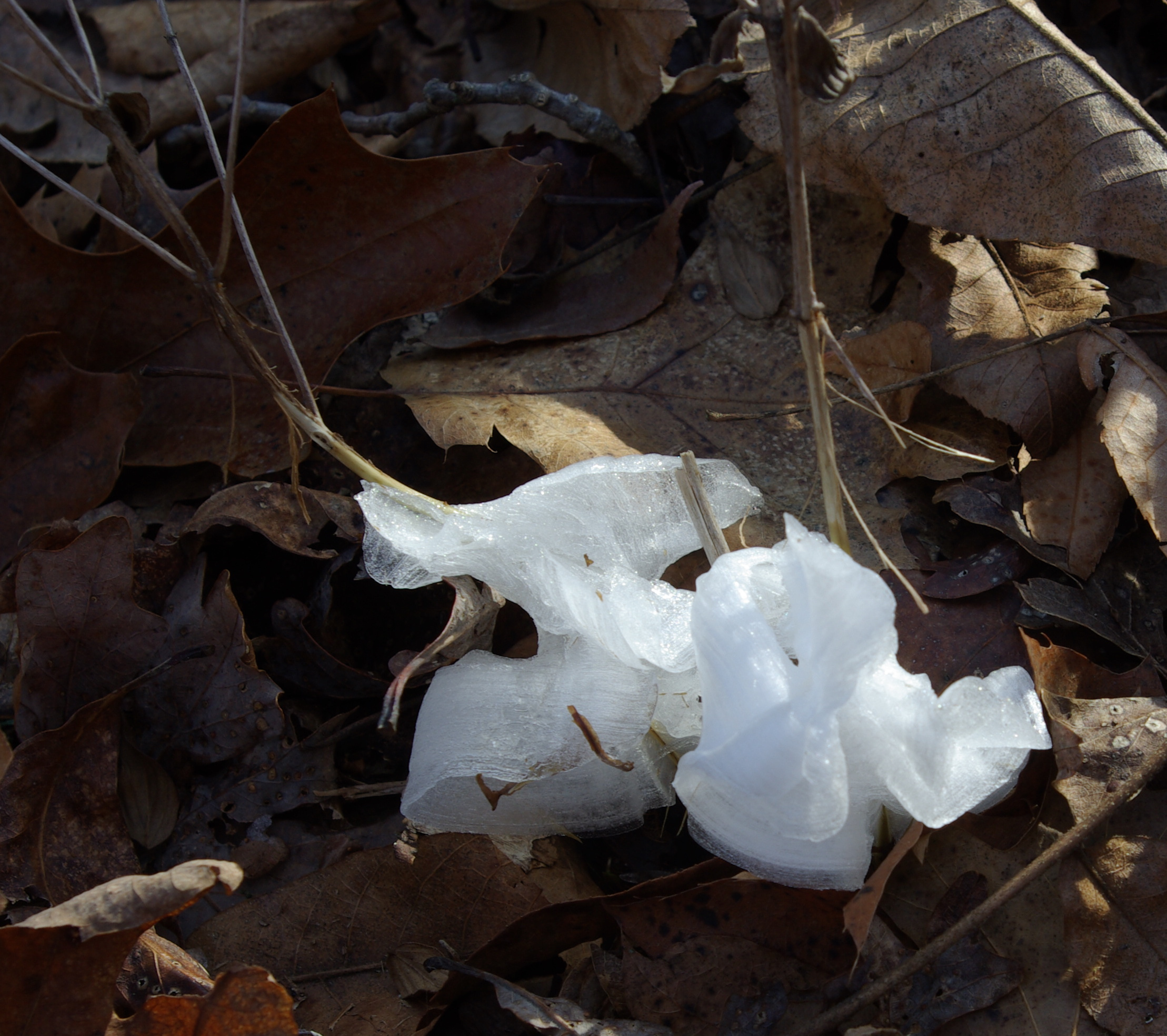
Frost flower on dittany
