= Stephensia unipunctella =

Scientific classification
- Kingdom: Animalia
- Phylum: Arthropoda
- Class: Insecta
- Order: Lepidoptera
- Family: Elachistidae
- Genus: Stephensia
- Species: S. unipunctella

Binomial name
- Stephensia unipunctella Nielsen & Traugott-Olsen, 1978

Species of moth

Stephensia unipunctella is a moth of the family Elachistidae. It is found in Spain.
