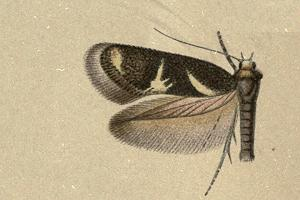
- Stephensia cedronellae

Scientific classification
- Kingdom: Animalia
- Phylum: Arthropoda
- Class: Insecta
- Order: Lepidoptera
- Family: Elachistidae
- Subfamily: Elachistinae
- Genus: Stephensia; Stainton, 1858

Synonyms
- Kumia Falkovich, 1986; Austriana Traugott-Olsen, 1995; Canariana Traugott-Olsen, 1995; Holstia Traugott-Olsen, 1995; Gibraltarensis Traugott-Olsen, 1996; Kearfottia Traugott-Olsen, 1996

= Stephensia (moth) =

Genus of moths

Stephensia is a genus of the small and very small moths of the family Elachistidae.

== Species ==
- Stephensia abbreviatella (Stainton, 1851)
- Stephensia armata Sruoga, 2003
- Stephensia brunichella (Linnaeus, 1767)
- Stephensia calpella (Walsingham, 1908)
- Stephensia cedronellae (Walsingham, 1908)
- Stephensia cunilae Braun, 1930
- Stephensia integra (Falkovich, 1986)
- Stephensia jalmarella Kaila, 1992
- Stephensia major (Kearfott, 1907)
- Stephensia staudingeri Nielson and Traugatt-Olson, 1981
- Stephensia unipunctella Nielsen & Traugott-Olsen, 1978
- Stephensia ussuriella Sinev, 1992
