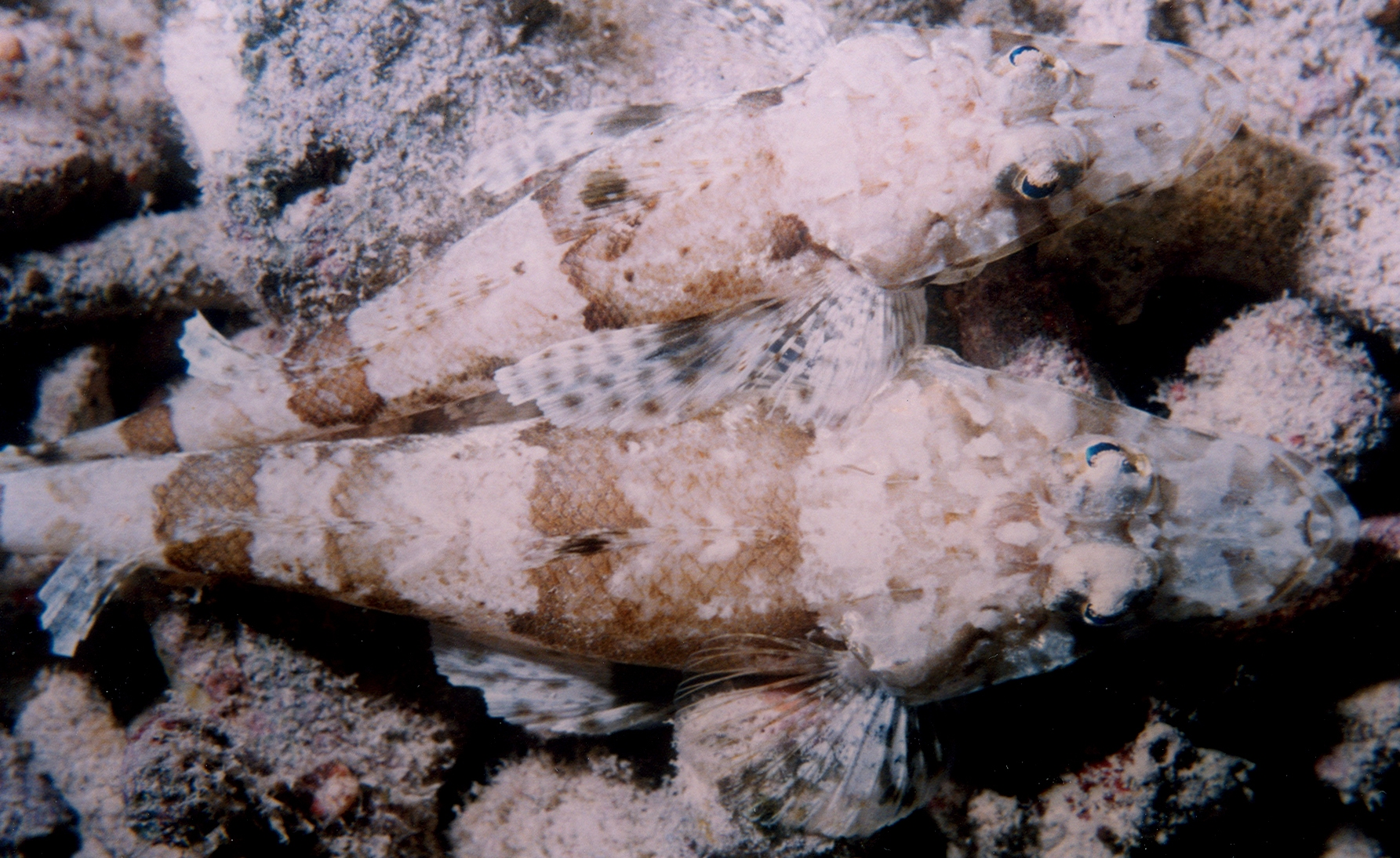
- Longsnout Flathead (T. chiltonae)
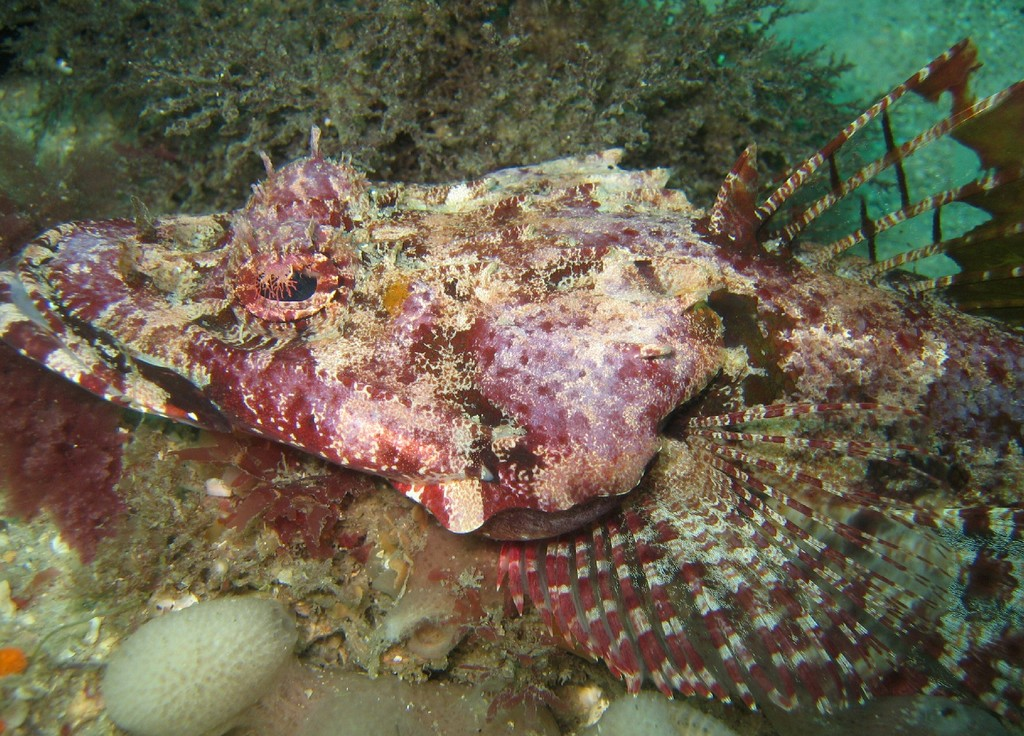
- Tasselsnout Flathead (T. cirronasa)

Scientific classification
- Kingdom: Animalia
- Phylum: Chordata
- Class: Actinopterygii
- Order: Perciformes
- Family: Platycephalidae
- Genus: Thysanophrys; J. D. Ogilby, 1898

Type species
- Platycephalus cirronasus Richardson, 1848

= Thysanophrys =

Genus of fishes

Thysanophrys is a genus of marine, demersal ray-finned fish belonging to the family Platycephalidae. These fishes are native to the Indian Ocean and the western Pacific Ocean.

== Taxonomy ==
Thysanophrys was first formally proposed as a genus in 1898 by the Australian ichthyologist James Douglas Ogilby with Platycephalus cirronasus, which had been described from Botany Bay in New South Wales in 1848 by John Richardson, as its type species. This genus is classified within the family Playtcephalidae, the flatheads which the 5th edition of Fishes of the World classifies within the suborder Platycephaloidei in the order Scorpaeniformes.

== Etymology ==
Thysanophrys is a combination of thysanos, meaning "fringe", and ophrys, which means "eyebrow", an allusion to the series of dermal appendages above the eye of T. cirronasus.

== Species ==
Thysanophrys contains 10 species:

- Thysanophrys armata (Fowler, 1938)
- Thysanophrys celebica (Bleeker, 1855) (Celebes flathead)
- Thysanophrys chiltonae L. P. Schultz, 1966 (Longsnout flathead)
- Thysanophrys cirronasa (J. Richardson, 1848) (Tasselsnout flathead)
- Thysanophrys longirostris (K. T. Shao & J. P. Chen, 1987)
- Thysanophrys papillaris Imamura & L. W. Knapp, 1999 (Smallknob flathead)
- Thysanophrys randalli L. W. Knapp, 2013 (Snub-snouted flathead)
- Thysanophrys rarita L. W. Knapp, 2013, (Somali flathead)
- Thysanophrys springeri L. W. Knapp, 2013, (Red Sea flathead)
- Thysanophrys tricaudata L. W. Knapp, 2013 (Sri Lankan flathead)

== Characteristics ==
Thysanophrys flatheads do noy have any elongation of the upper lobe of the caudal fin with no elongated filament extending out from that fin. The first dorsal fin has between 8 or 9 spines. the second being equal in height to the third, while the second dorsal fin has no more than 12 soft rays. There are 2 separate patches of vomerine teeth. There are between 48 and 56 pored scales, each with 2 pores, on the lateral line with spines on the scales in the anterior portion of that line. The diagonal rows of scales run downwards and backwards over lateral line and the number of these rows is roughly about equal to the number of scales in the lateral line, typically with a difference of only 1 or 2 scales. The head has bony ridges that have a few larger spines below the eye, the head has two bony ridges on its sides with the lower margin of the suborbital ridge being visible. The lappet on the iris may be crenate or have short branches. Typically there is a single spine in front of the eye and 3 or less spines on the preoperculum, with the upper spine clearly being the longest, although it does not reach the edge of the operculum, and the lower spine on the operculum has its base hidden by scales. The maximum length attained by these fishes varies from a standard length of 9.9 cm (3.9 in) in T. randalli to a maximum total length of 25 cm (9.8 in) in T. chiltonae.

== Distribution ==
Thysanophrys flatheads are found in the Indo-West Pacific where they occur from east Africa and the Red Sea east to Marquesas.
