= Stephensia staudingeri =

Scientific classification
- Kingdom: Animalia
- Phylum: Arthropoda
- Class: Insecta
- Order: Lepidoptera
- Family: Elachistidae
- Genus: Stephensia
- Species: S. staudingeri

Binomial name
- Stephensia staudingeri Nielsen & Traugott-Olsen, 1981

Species of moth

Stephensia staudingeri is a moth of the family Elachistidae. It is found on the island of Rhodes in Greece.
