= Stephensia brunnichella =

Scientific classification
- Kingdom: Animalia
- Phylum: Arthropoda
- Class: Insecta
- Order: Lepidoptera
- Family: Elachistidae
- Genus: Stephensia
- Species: S. brunnichella

Binomial name
- Stephensia brunnichella (Linnaeus, 1767)

Synonyms
- Phalaena brunnichella Linnaeus, 1767; Microsetia stephensella Douglas, 1848

Species of moth

Stephensia brunnichella is a moth of the family Elachistidae found in Europe and east into the Palearctic.

== Description ==
The wingspan is 8–9 mm. The head is dark bronzy. Antennae with white subapical band. Forewings are dark bronzyfuscous; a subbasal fascia, another before middle, an erect tornal spot, and a costal spot before apex pale golden-metallic. Hindwings are dark grey. The larva is green-whitish; dorsal line dark green; head and plate of 2 blackish.

== Biology ==
The larvae feed on lesser calamint (Calamintha nepeta), wild basil (Clinopodium vulgare) and Satureja calamintha mining the leaves of their host plant. The larvae have a greenish body with a black head. They can be found from autumn to April and again in July.

== Distribution ==
It is widespread throughout Europe. In the north, the distribution extends up to southern Sweden and Finland and in the east it ranges as far as Asia Minor and the Crimea.
