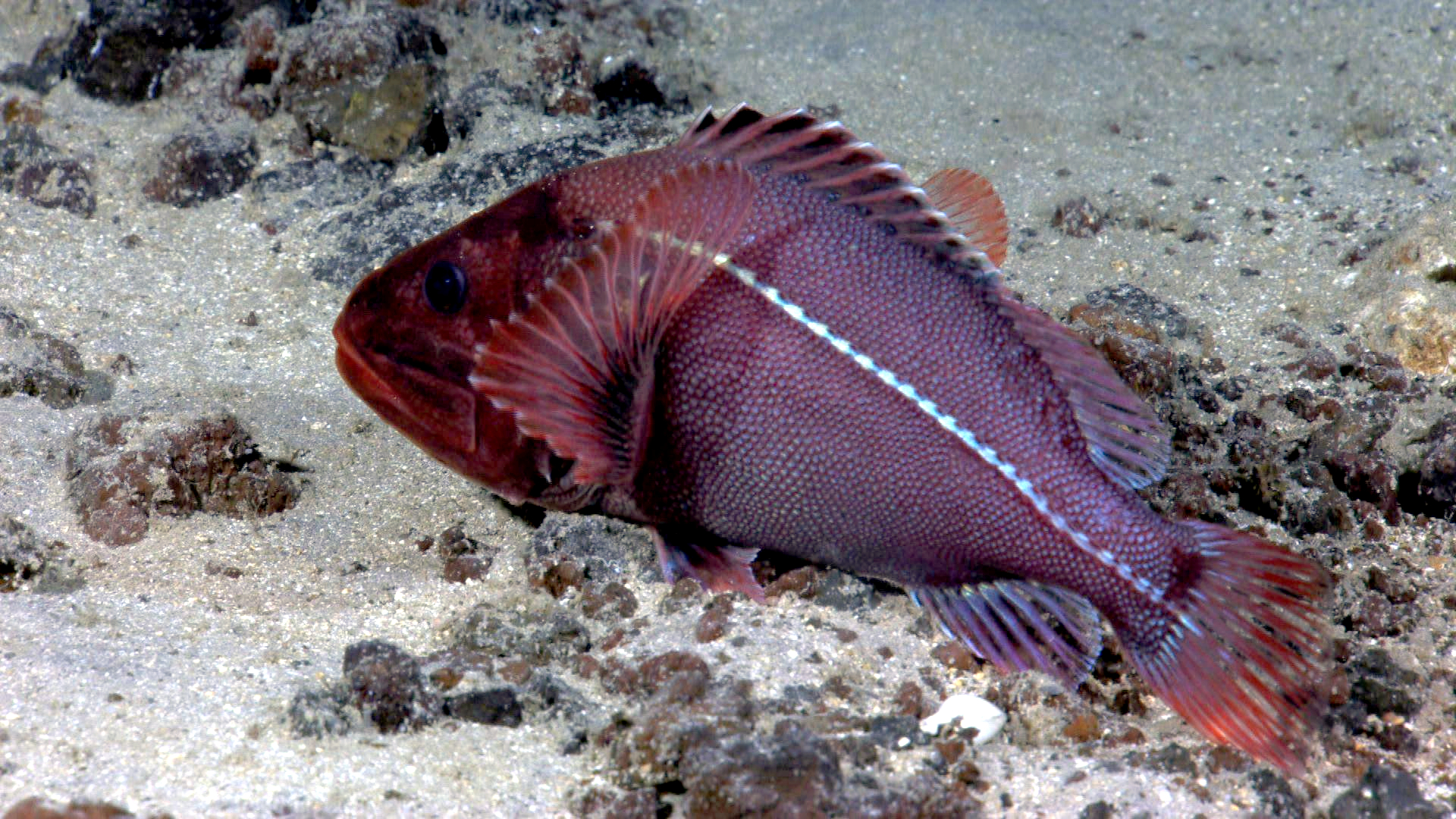
- Ectreposebastes imus

Scientific classification
- Kingdom: Animalia
- Phylum: Chordata
- Class: Actinopterygii
- Order: Perciformes
- Family: Scorpaenidae
- Subfamily: Setarchinae
- Genus: Ectreposebastes; Garman, 1899

Type species
- Ectreposebastes imus Garman, 1899

= Ectreposebastes =

Genus of fishes

Ectreposebastes is a genus of marine ray-finned fish, belonging to the subfamily Setarchinae, the deep-sea bristly scorpionfishes, part of the family Scorpaenidae. The genus is found in the Atlantic, Indian and Pacific Oceans.

== Taxonomy ==
Ectreposebastes was first described as a monotypic genus in 1899 by the American ichthyologist Samuel German when he described what was then its only species, E. imus, from the Galápagos Islands. The genus name Ectreposebastes is a compound of ectrepos which means "reversed", German did not explain this, and Sebastes. It may refer to the greater depth of the body with the back arching higher under the soft-rayed part of the dorsal fin, whereas in S. diploproa the species Garman cited for comparison purposes, the greatest body depth occurs under spiny part of the dorsal fin.

== Species ==
There are currently two recognized species in this genus:

- Ectreposebastes imus Garman, 1899 (Midwater scorpionfish)
- Ectreposebastes niger (Fourmanoir, 1971) (Pelagic scorpionfish)

== Characteristics ==
Ectreposebastes has a relatively deep body which is rather soft and flabby. The head is quite large with a weakly ossified cranium, the bone of which is translucent and has a large volume. There is, no postocular pit and any head spines are weak. There is a longitudinal suborbital ridge which has a single very small first spine but the next two are much bigger. They have a medium sized eye. There are many small conical teeth on the jaws and there are teeth on the sides of the roof of the mouth. The margin of the preopercular has 5 spines with the second spine being the longest. There is a single dorsal fin which has a deep incision at the rear of its spiny part. This part contains 12 robust and venomous spines and there are 9 or 10 soft rays to the rear of the incision. The anal fin has 3 spines and 6 soft rays, the last one being divided., The lateral line is complete, being a continuous trough covered by thin membrane-like scales. The scales are very small and smooth, arranged in ill-defined rows. They have a swim bladder which is either rudimentary or absent.

== Distribution and habitat ==
Ectreposebastes contains one species with an almost pantropical distribution in E. imus which occurs in the Eastern Pacific, Atlantic and Indian Oceans, while E. niger is restricted to the southwestern Pacific Ocean. They are bathypelagic fishes found at depths between 150 and 2,000 m (490 and 6,560 ft).

== Biology ==
Ectreposebastes are thought to feed in the water column. Their main food is crustaceans including amphipods and shrimp of the genus Sergestes. They have venom bearing spines in at least their anal fins.
