= Stephensia jalmarella =

Scientific classification
- Kingdom: Animalia
- Phylum: Arthropoda
- Class: Insecta
- Order: Lepidoptera
- Family: Elachistidae
- Genus: Stephensia
- Species: S. jalmarella

Binomial name
- Stephensia jalmarella Kaila, 1992

Species of moth

Stephensia jalmarella is a moth in the family Elachistidae. It was described by Lauri Kaila in 1992. It is found in the Altai Mountains.
