= Stephensia ussuriella =

Scientific classification
- Kingdom: Animalia
- Phylum: Arthropoda
- Clade: Pancrustacea
- Class: Insecta
- Order: Lepidoptera
- Family: Elachistidae
- Genus: Stephensia
- Species: S. ussuriella

Binomial name
- Stephensia ussuriella Sinev, 1992

Species of moth

Stephensia ussuriella is a moth in the family Elachistidae. It was described by Sinev in 1992. It is found in the Russian Far East.
