= Stephensia cunilae =

Scientific classification
- Domain: Eukaryota
- Kingdom: Animalia
- Phylum: Arthropoda
- Class: Insecta
- Order: Lepidoptera
- Family: Elachistidae
- Genus: Stephensia
- Species: S. cunilae

Binomial name
- Stephensia cunilae Braun, 1930

Species of moth

Stephensia cunilae is a moth of the family Elachistidae. It is found in the United States, where it has been recorded from Ohio, Kentucky and Indiana.

The wingspan is 6.5–7 mm. Adults are on wing in late June and July and again in September in two generations per year.

The larvae feed on Cunila origanoides.Adults of the second generation overwinter.
