= Stephensia integra =

Scientific classification
- Domain: Eukaryota
- Kingdom: Animalia
- Phylum: Arthropoda
- Class: Insecta
- Order: Lepidoptera
- Family: Elachistidae
- Genus: Stephensia
- Species: S. integra

Binomial name
- Stephensia integra (Falkovitsh, 1986)

Synonyms
- Kumia integra Falkovitsh, 1986

Species of moth

Stephensia integra is a moth in the family Elachistidae. It was described by Mark I. Falkovitsh in 1986. It is found in Uzbekistan.
