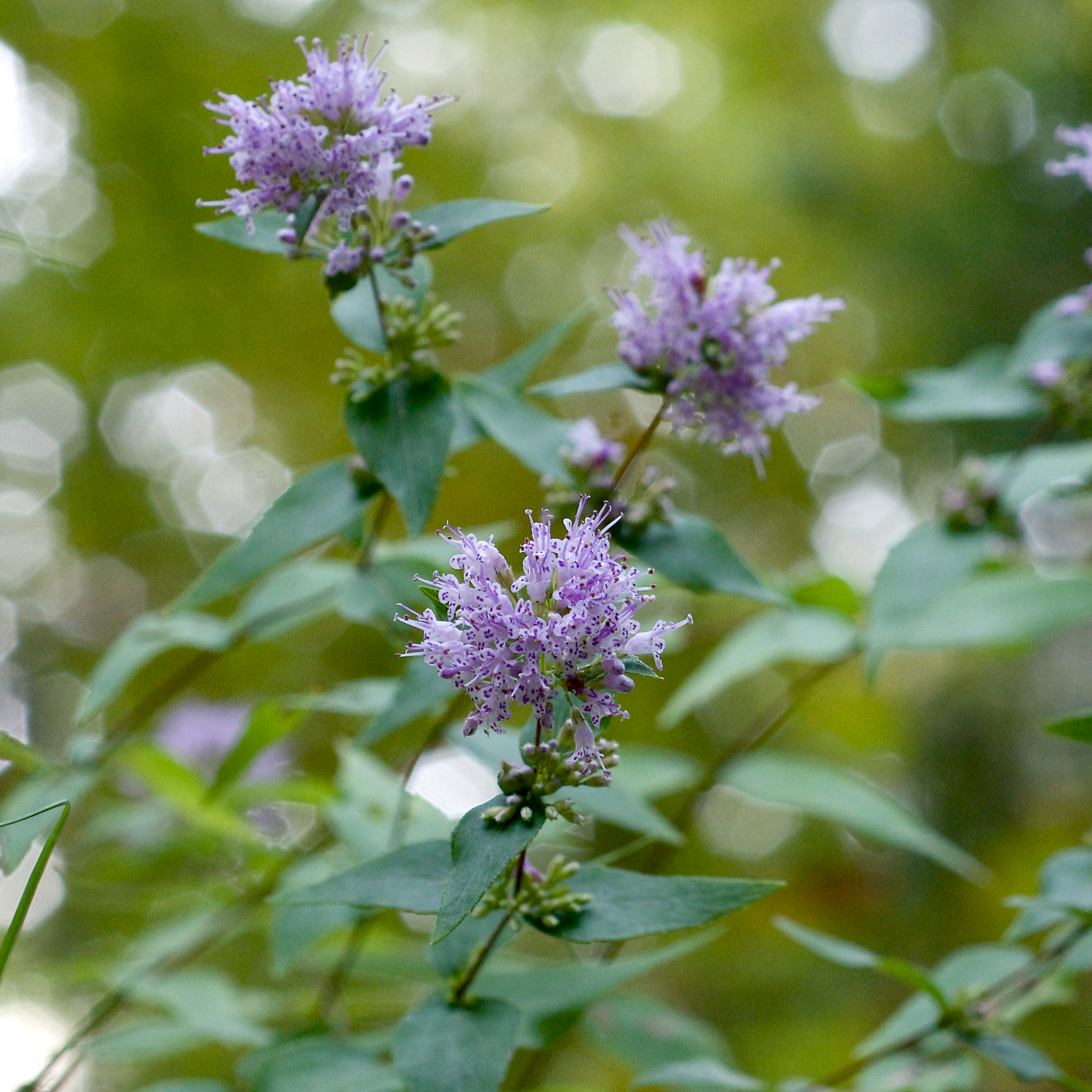
- Cunila origanoides

Scientific classification
- Kingdom: Plantae
- Clade: Tracheophytes
- Clade: Angiosperms
- Clade: Eudicots
- Clade: Asterids
- Order: Lamiales
- Family: Lamiaceae
- Subfamily: Nepetoideae
- Tribe: Mentheae
- Genus: Cunila; D.Royen ex L.

Synonyms
- Mappia Heist. ex Fabr rejected name; Hedyosmos Mitch.

= Cunila =

Genus of flowering plants

Cunila is a genus of plants in the Lamiaceae, first described in 1759. It is native to North and South America.

Species

- Cunila angustifolia Benth. - southern Brazil, Misiones Province of Argentina
- Cunila crenata García-Peña & Tenorio - State of Durango in Mexico
- Cunila fasciculata Benth. - southern Brazil
- Cunila galioides Benth. - Brazil
- Cunila incana Benth. - southern Brazil, Argentina
- Cunila incisa Benth. - southern Brazil
- Cunila leucantha Kunth ex Schltdl. & Cham. - Mexico (Veracruz, Guerrero, Oaxaca, Chiapas), Central America (Guatemala, El Salvador, Honduras, Panama)
- Cunila lythrifolia Benth. - central + southern Mexico
- Cunila menthiformis Epling - southern Brazil
- Cunila menthoides Benth. - Uruguay
- Cunila microcephala Benth. - southern Brazil, Argentina, Uruguay
- Cunila origanoides (L.) Britton - central + eastern United States from Texas and Kansas east to New York and Georgia
- Cunila platyphylla Epling - southern Brazil
- Cunila polyantha Benth. - Mexico (from Zacatecas and Jalisco south to Chiapas), Central America (Guatemala, Honduras, Panama)
- Cunila pycnantha B.L.Rob. & Greenm. - Mexico (from Sinaloa and Durango south to Chiapas)
- Cunila ramamoorthiana M.R.Garcia-Pena - Mexico (Guerrero)
- Cunila spicata Benth. - southern Brazil, Argentina, Uruguay, Paraguay
- Cunila tenuifolia Epling - southern Brazil
