= Frostweed =

Frostweed is a common name for several plants and may refer to:

- Helianthemum or Crocanthemum, in the family Cistaceae
- Verbesina virginica in the family Asteraceae
