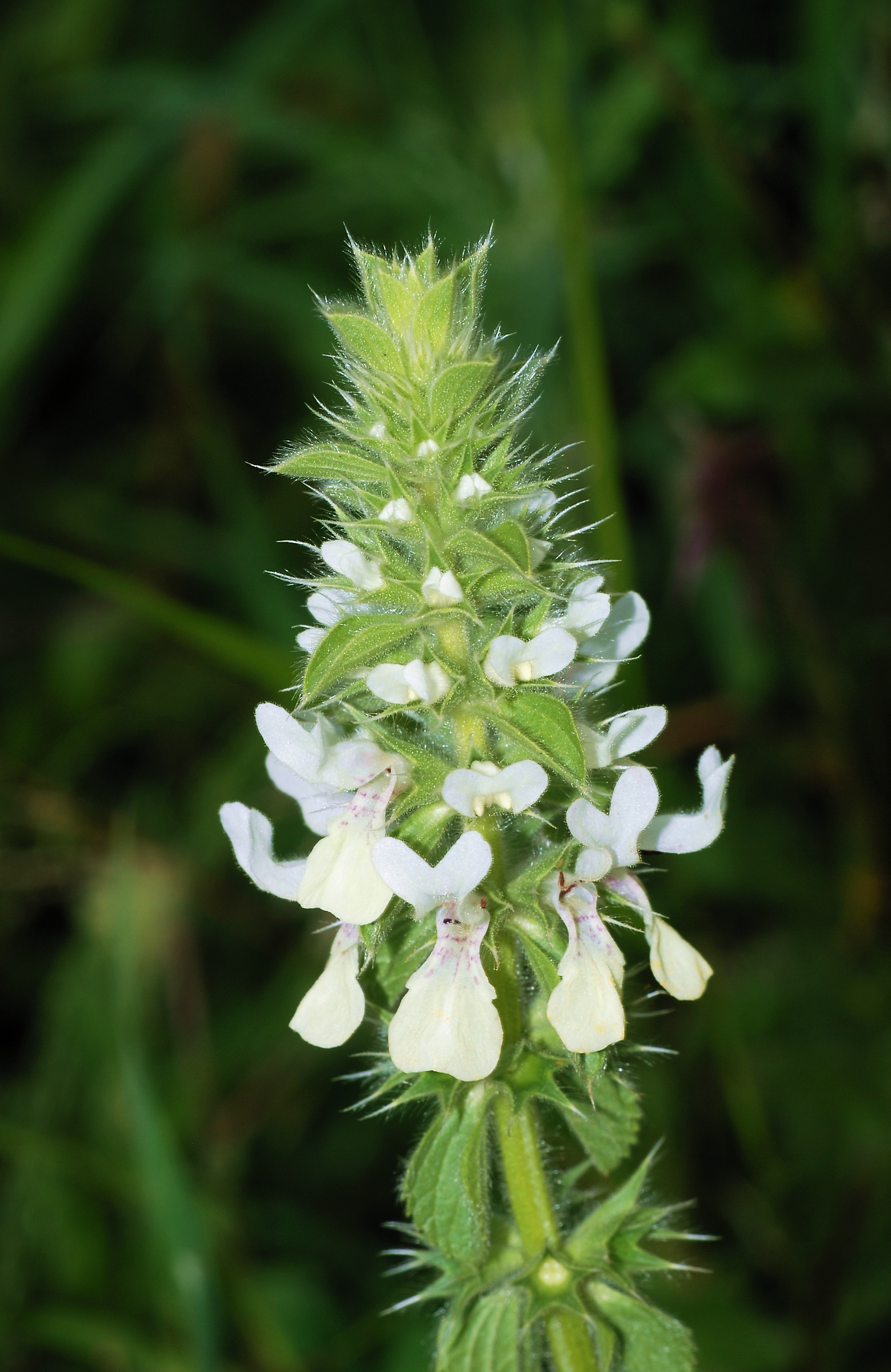

Scientific classification
- Kingdom: Plantae
- Clade: Tracheophytes
- Clade: Angiosperms
- Clade: Eudicots
- Clade: Asterids
- Order: Lamiales
- Family: Lamiaceae
- Genus: Stachys
- Species: S. ocymastrum

Binomial name
- Stachys ocymastrum (L.) Briq.

= Stachys ocymastrum =

Species of plant

Stachys ocymastrum, the Italian hedgenettle, is a species of annual herb in the family Lamiaceae. They have a self-supporting growth form. Flowers are visited by Green-striped White. Individuals can grow to 0.4 m.
