= Stephensia armata =

Scientific classification
- Kingdom: Animalia
- Phylum: Arthropoda
- Clade: Pancrustacea
- Class: Insecta
- Order: Lepidoptera
- Family: Elachistidae
- Genus: Stephensia
- Species: S. armata

Binomial name
- Stephensia armata Sruoga, 2003

Species of moth

Stephensia armata is a Central American moth of the family Elachistidae and Gelechioidea superfamily, discovered in 1998 at Las Cuevas Research Station, in Belize's Chiquibul Forest Reserve.

== Physiology ==
The wingspan is approximately 6.6 millimetres (0.26 in), with a forewing length of 3 millimetres (0.12 in). It is distinguishable by the 2-3 teeth arming the valvae, from which it gets its name. The species is remarkable for the single transverse fascia of the forewing, and long lobes of the valvae and juxta.

Coloration is largely pale ochre or grey-brown. The underside and head are paler, while its back and wings are grey-brown or dark ochre. Pale ochre scales spread across every segment distally.

S. armata is distinct from congeneric American species of moth in the deep split between the juxta lobes, and its relatively small uncus. It is noticeably apomorphic in its phylogeny.

== Habitat ==
Samples of S. armata were collected in April, during the rainy season in Belize. The local vegetation was largely evergreen, with some deciduous trees.

== Discussion of nomenclature ==
S. armata is named on the convention assigning three genera to Lepidoptera, due to the researchers’ preference for a more stable taxonomy and the characteristics of Armata that place it squarely within Stephensia.
