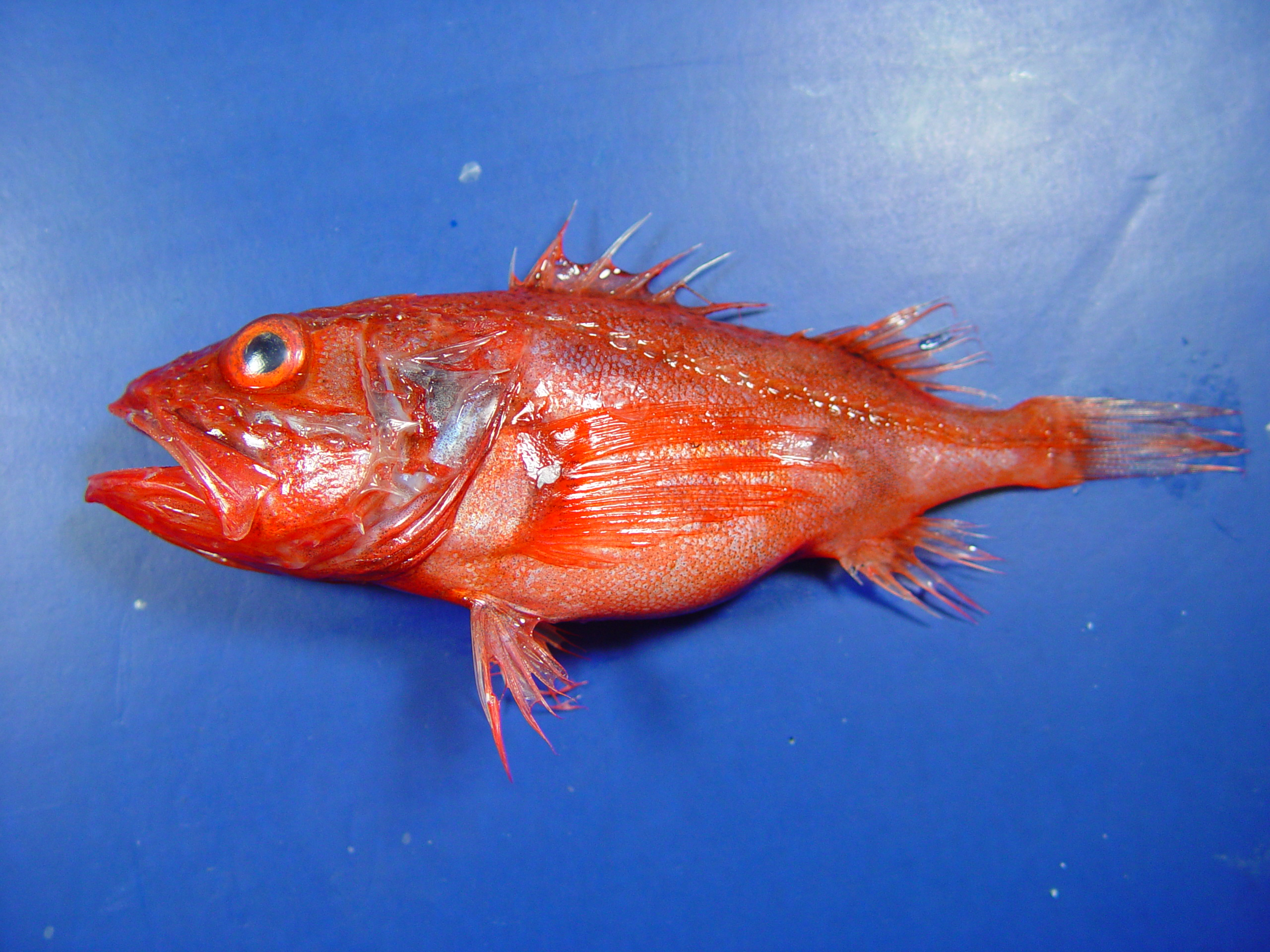
- Channeled Rockfish (S. guentheri)

Scientific classification
- Kingdom: Animalia
- Phylum: Chordata
- Class: Actinopterygii
- Order: Perciformes
- Family: Scorpaenidae
- Subfamily: Setarchinae
- Genus: Setarches; J. Y. Johnson, 1862

= Setarches =

Setarches Temporal range: Middle Miocene to present

Genus of fishes

Setarches is a genus of deep-sea bristly scorpionfishes.

== Species ==
There is currently one recognized species in this genus:

- Setarches guentheri J. Y. Johnson, 1862 (Channelled rockfish)

An indeterminate fossil Setarches is known from the Middle Miocene of Sakhalin, Russia.
