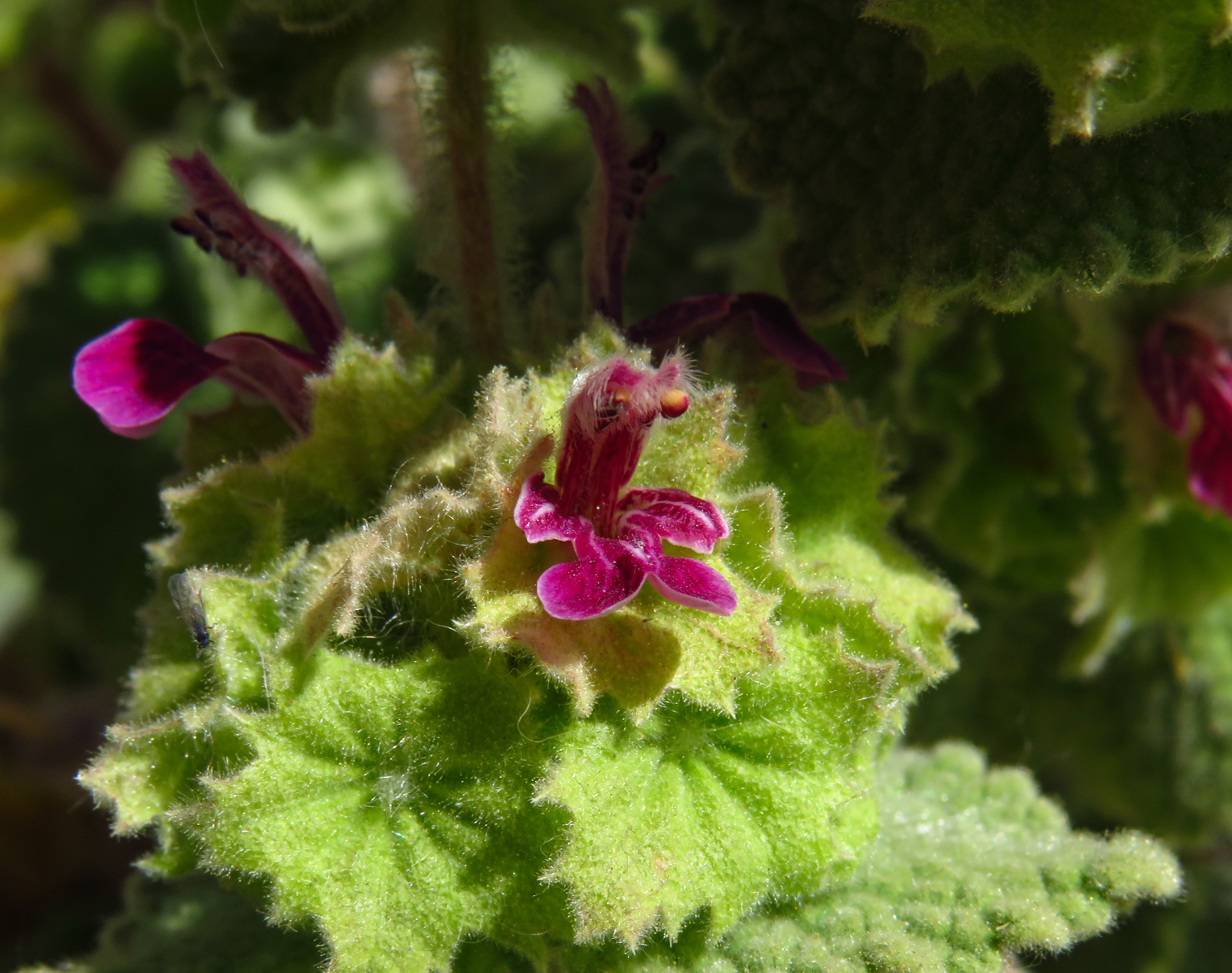

Scientific classification
- Kingdom: Plantae
- Clade: Embryophytes
- Clade: Tracheophytes
- Clade: Angiosperms
- Clade: Eudicots
- Clade: Asterids
- Order: Lamiales
- Family: Lamiaceae
- Genus: Pseudodictamnus
- Species: P. hirsutus

Binomial name
- Pseudodictamnus hirsutus (Willd.) Salmaki & Siadati

Synonyms
- Ballota hirsuta Benth. 1834; Marrubium hirsutum Willd.

= Pseudodictamnus hirsutus =

Species of flowering plant in the sage family

Pseudodictamnus hirsutus is a species of plant in the family Lamiaceae. It is native to the western Mediterranean region, mostly abundant in Spain and Portugal. It is also native to North Africa.
