= Thysanophrys armata =

Scientific classification
- Kingdom: Animalia
- Phylum: Chordata
- Class: Actinopterygii
- Order: Perciformes
- Family: Platycephalidae
- Genus: Thysanophrys
- Species: T. armata

Binomial name
- Thysanophrys armata (Fowler, 1938)

Synonyms
- Cymbacephalus armatus Fowler, 1938; Platycephalus armatus (Fowler, 1938)

Species of fish

Thysanophrys armata is a species of marine ray-finned fish belonging to the family Platycephalidae, the flatheads. It is a little known species which is found in the Indo-Pacific where it has been recorded from the Philippines and Sri Lanka.
