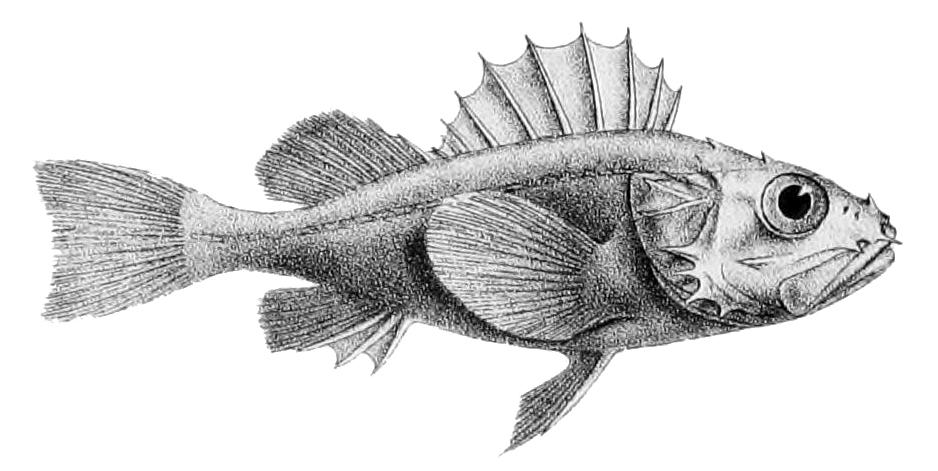
- Deepwater scorpionfish Setarches guentheri

Scientific classification
- Kingdom: Animalia
- Phylum: Chordata
- Class: Actinopterygii
- Order: Perciformes
- Family: Scorpaenidae
- Subfamily: Setarchinae; Matsubara, 1943

Genera
- see text

= Setarchinae =

Setarchinae Temporal range: Late Miocene–present

Family of fishes

Setarchinae, the deep-sea bristly scorpionfishes, is a small subfamily of deep-sea ray-finned fishes, it is part of the family Scorpaenidae. They are small marine fishes, growing up to 25 cm, and are found in tropical and subtropical waters throughout the world.

== Taxonomy ==
Setarchinae, or the family Setarchidae, were first described as a taxon by the Japanese ichthyologist Kiyomatsu Matsubara in 1943. The grouping is treated as a subfamily of the Scorpaenidae within the order Scorpaeniformes by the 5th Edition of Fishes of the World. However, other authorities, such as FishBase, regard the taxon as a family within the suborder Scorpaenoidei, part of the Perciformes. The name of the subfamily comes from Setarches which was described by the English zoologist James Yate Johnson in 1862 but Johnson did not explain what the name alluded to, it may be derived from saeta meaning "bristle".

== Genera ==
The following four genera are classified within the subfamily Setarchinae, and the combined have a total of 11 species.

- Ectreposebastes Garman, 1899
- Lioscorpius Günther, 1880:
- Lythrichthys Jordan & Starks, 1904
- Setarches Johnson, 1862

Lithrchthys was previously regarded as a synonym of Setarches but has been treated as a valid genus by Catalog of Fishes with Setarches being considered to be a monotypic genus containing solely S. guentheri.

The only known fossil member of the subfamily is †Raususetarches Yabumoto & Nazarkin, 2021 from the Late Miocene of Japan.

== Characteristics ==
Setarchinae species are differentiated from related species by the possession of a highly modified lateral line, reduced ossification and a reduction in the head's ability to be moved, supination. The lateral line is lacking in scales and consists of a single trough and the scales on the body are small and cycloid. In adults there are no suborbital spines. They have a small, sharp nasal spine and the parietal bone is low, ending at its rear end with a spine or spinule. In large specimens many spines are absent and in smaller specimens there are some spines around the eye but in larger individuals only the postocular spine is well defined. They have 12–13, typically 12 spines and 9–11 soft rays in the dorsal fin, the last ray is divided close to its base. The anal fin has 2–3 spines and 4–6 soft rays, the last ray being divided.

== Distribution and habitat ==
Setrachinae are found in the Atlantic, Indian and Pacific Oceans. They are offshore fish which can be found at depths between 180 and 830 m (590 and 2,720 ft) and examination of the stomach contents of two species suggest that they feed in the water column.
