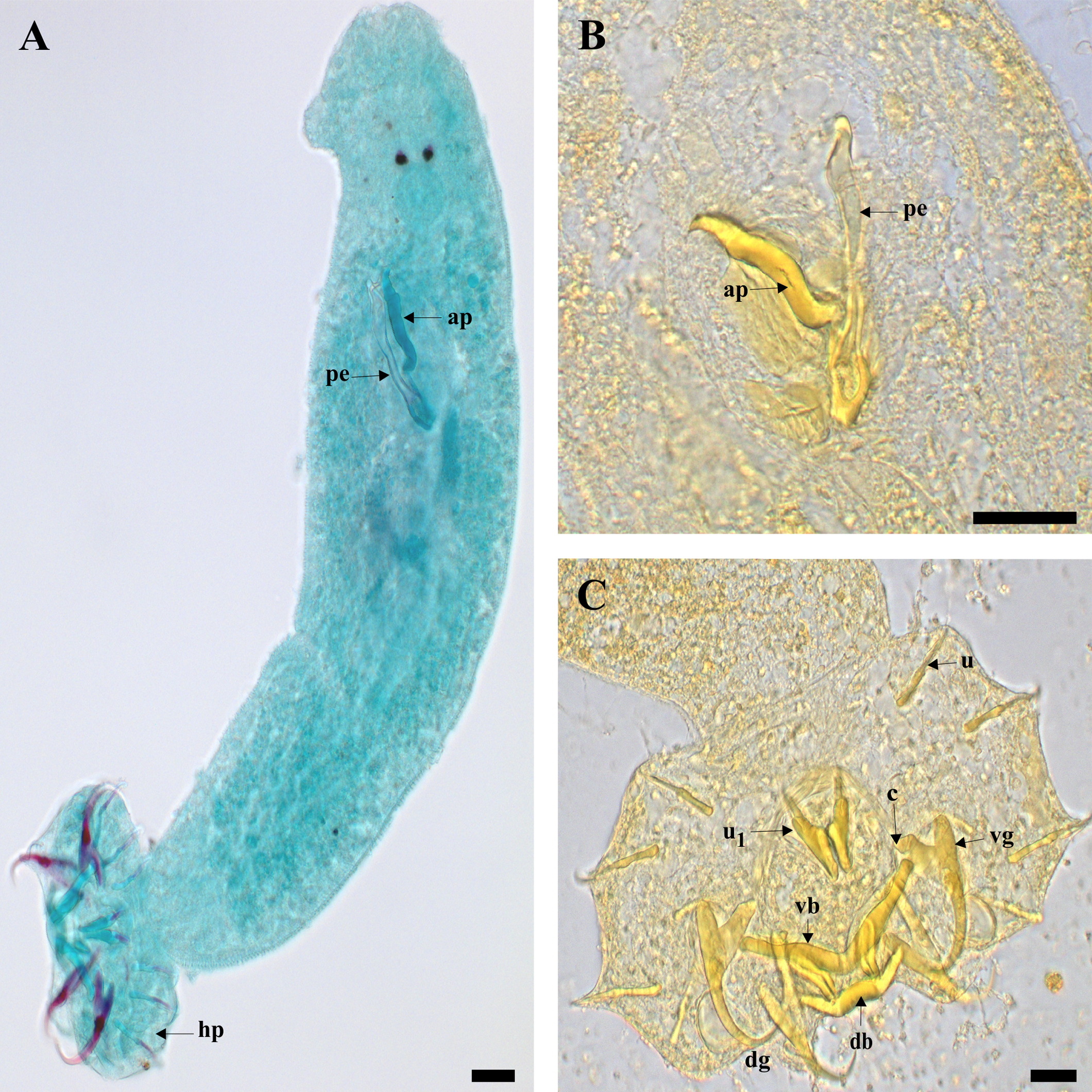
- Cichlidogyrus philander

Scientific classification
- Kingdom: Animalia
- Phylum: Platyhelminthes
- Class: Monogenea
- Order: Dactylogyridea
- Family: Ancyrocephalidae; Bychowsky & Nagibina, 1968

Synonyms
- Bychowskymonogeninae Caballero & Bravo-Hollis, 1969; Engraulitrematidae Gupta & Krishna, 1980; Heterotesiidae Euzet & Dossou, 1979

= Ancyrocephalidae =

Family of flatworms

Ancyrocephalidae is a family of monogenean flatworms. The family is considered as a "temporary name" in WorMS but includes a large number of genera and species.

== Genera ==
- Actinocleidus Mueller, 1937
- Aethycteron Suriano & Beverley-Burton, 1982
- Afrocleidodiscus Paperna, 1969
- Ameloblastella Kritsky, Mendoza-Franco & Scholz, 2000
- Amphithecium Boeger & Kritsky, 1988
- Amphocleithrum Price & Romero, 1969
- Anacanthoroides Kritsky & Thatcher, 1974
- Anacanthorus Mizelle & Price, 1965
- Anchoradiscoides Rogers, 1967
- Anchoradiscus Mizelle, 1941
- Ancistrohaptor Agarwal & Kritsky, 1998
- Ancyrocephalinae Bychowsky, 1937
- Ancyrocephaloides Yamaguti, 1938
- Ancyrocephalus Creplin, 1839
- Androspira Suriano, 1981
- Annulotrema Paperna & Thurston, 1969
- Annulotrematoides Kritsky & Boeger, 1995
- Apedunculata Cuglianna, Cordeiro & Luque, 2009
- Aphanoblastella Kritsky, Mendoza-Franco & Scholz, 2000
- Archidiplectanum Mizelle & Kritsky, 1969
- Aristocleidus Mueller, 1936

Drawings of Aristocleidus mexicanus

- Atherinicus Bychowsky & Nagibina, 1969
- Bicentenariella Cruces, Chero, Sáez & Luque, 2021
- Biotodomella Morey, Arimuya & Boeger, 2019
- Birgiellus Bilong Bilong, Nack & Euzet, 2007
- Boegeriella Mendoza-Palmero & Hsiao, 2020
- Bouixella Euzet & Dossou, 1976
- Bravohollisia Bychowsky & Nagibina, 1970
- Bychowskymonogenea Caballero & Bravo-Hollis, 1969
- Caballeria Bychowsky & Nagibina, 1970
- Cacatuocotyle Boeger, Domingues & Kritsky, 1997
- Calpidotheciodes Kritsky, Boeger & Jégu, 1997
- Calpidothecium Kritsky, Boeger & Jégu, 1997
- Characidotrema Paperna & Thurston, 1968
- Characithecium Mendoza-Franco, Reina & Torchin, 2009
- Cichlidogyrus Paperna, 1960

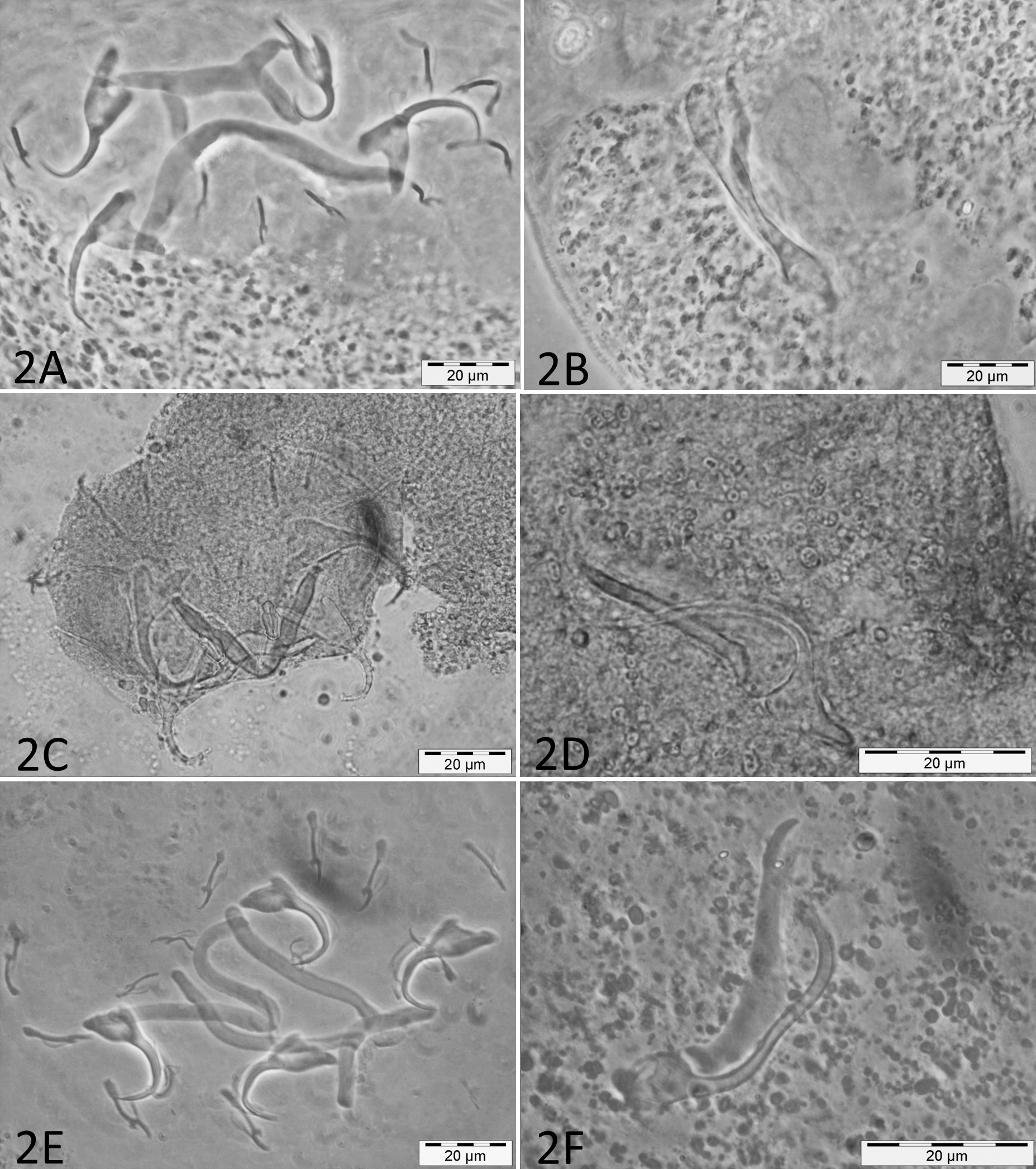
Haptoral and male genital sclerotized structures from Cichlidogyrus spp.

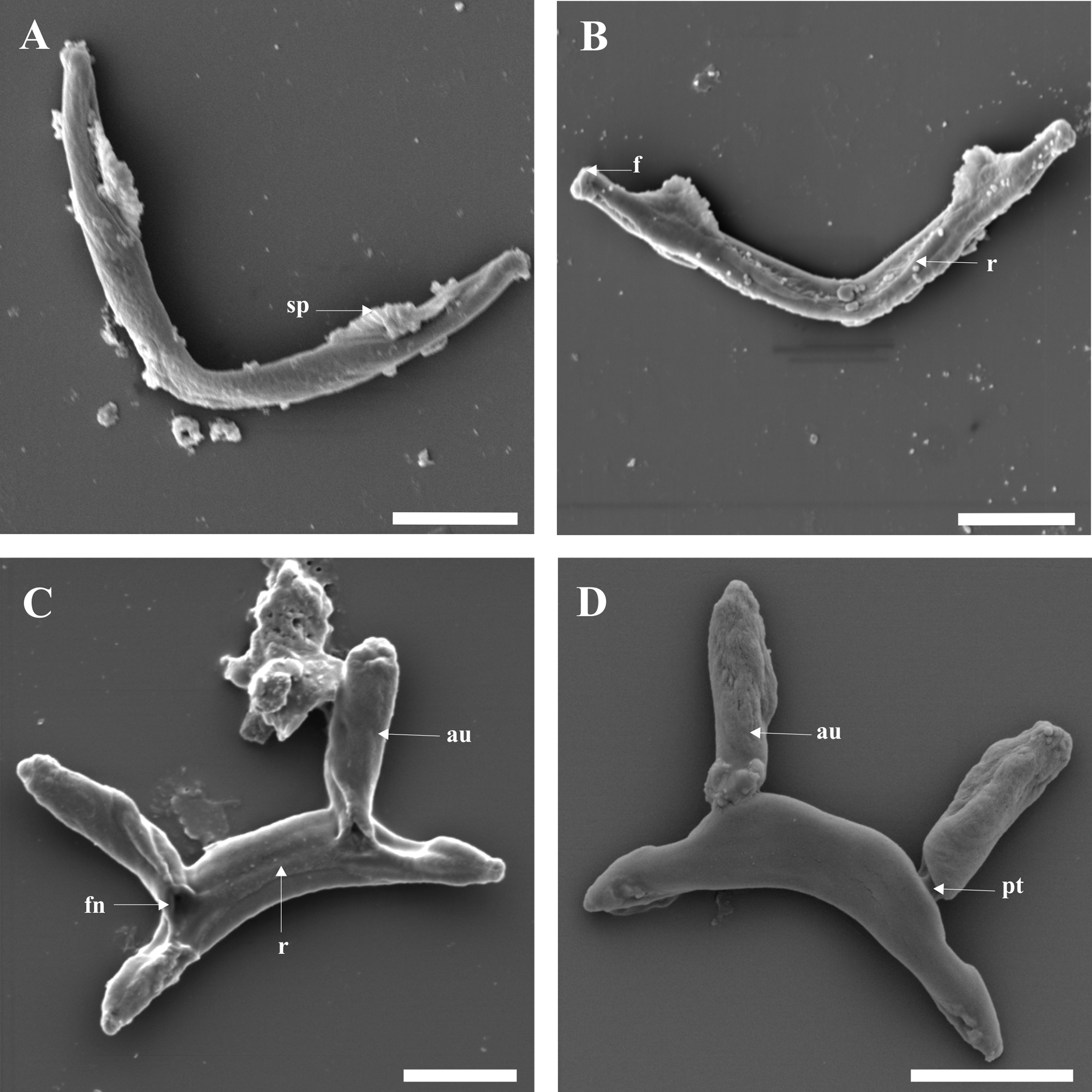
SEM of sclerotized structures of Cichlidogyrus philander

- Clavunculus Mizelle, Stokely, Jaskoski, Seamster & Monaco, 1956
- Cleidodiscus Mueller, 1934
- Cleithrarticus Mizelle, 1963
- Constrictoanchoratus Ferreira, Rodrigues, Cunha & Domingues, 2017
- Cosmetocleithrum Kritsky, Thatcher & Boeger, 1986
- Crinicleidus Beverley-Burton, 1986
- Cryptocephalum Vega, Viozzi & Brugni, 2011
- Curvianchoratus Hanek, Molnár & Fernando, 1974
- Dawestrema Price & Nowlin, 1967
- Diaphorocleidus Jogunoori, Kritsky & Venkatanarasaiah, 2004
- Diplectanotrema Johnston & Tiegs, 1922
- Diversohamulus Bychowsky & Nagibina, 1969
- Duplaccessorius Viozzi & Brugni, 2004
- Enallothecium Kritsky, Boeger & Jégu, 1998
- Enterogyrus Paperna, 1963
- Euryhaliotrema Kritsky & Boeger, 2002
- Eutrianchoratus Paperna, 1969
- Glandulocephalus Unnithan, 1972
- Glyphidohaptor Kritsky, Galli & Yang, 2007
- Gobioecetes Ogawa & Ito, 2017
- Gonocleithrum Kritsky & Thatcher, 1983
- Guavinella Mendoza-Franco, Scholz & Cabañas-Carranza, 2003
- Gussevia Kohn & Paperna, 1964
- Haliotrema Johnston & Tiegs, 1922
- Haliotrematoides Kritsky, Yang & Sun, 2009
- Hareocephalus Young, 1968
- Helicirrus Corlis, 2004
- Hemirhamphiculus Bychowsky & Nagibina, 1970
- Heteronchocleidus Bychowsly, 1957
- Heteropriapulus Kritsky, 2007
- Heterotesia Paperna, 1969
- Heterothecium Kritsky, Boeger & Jégu, 1997
- Iliocirrus Corlis, 2004
- Inserotrema Viozzi, Marín, Carvajal, Brugni & Mancilla, 2007
- Insulacleidus Rakotofiringa & Euzet, 1983
- Jainus Mizelle, Kritzky & Crane, 1968
- Kapentagyrus Kmentová, Gelnar & Vanhove in Kmentová, Steenberge, Raeymaekers, Koblmüller, Mulungula, N'sibula, Hablützel, Bukinga, Nzigidahera, Ntakimazi, Gelnar & Vanhove, 2018
- Kriboetrema Sarabeev, Rubtsova, Yang & Balbuena, 2013
- Kritskyia Kohn, 1990
- Leptocleidus Mueller, 1936
- Lethrinitrema Lim & Justine, 2011
- Ligictaluridus Beverley-Burton, 1984
- Ligophorus Euzet & Suriano, 1977
- Linguadactyla Brinkmann, 1940
- Linguadactyloides Thatcher & Kritsky, 1983
- Longidigitis Corlis, 2004
- Marumbius Boeger, Ferreira, Vianna & Patella, 2014
- Mastacembelocleidus Kritsky, Pandey, Agrawal & Abdullah, 2004
- Metahaliotrema Yamaguti, 1953
- Mexicana Caballero & Bravo-Hollis, 1959
- Mexicotrema Lamothe-Argumedo, 1969
- Micronococotyle Kritsky, Aquaro & Galli, 2010
- Monocleithrium Price & McMahon, 1966
- Mymarothecium Kritsky, Boeger & Jégu, 1998
- Nanayella Acosta, Mendoza-Palmero, da Silva & Scholz, 2019
- Nanotrema Paperna, 1969
- Nasoancyrocephalus Machida, 1979
- Neodiplectanotrema Gerasev, Gaevskaja & Kovaleva, 1987
- Neohaliotrema Yamaguti, 1965
- Notodiplocerus Suriano, 1980
- Notothecioides Kritsky, Boeger & Jégu, 1997
- Notothecium Boeger & Kritsky, 1988
- Notozothecium Boeger & Kritsky, 1988
- Octouncuhaptor Mendoza-Franco, Roche & Torchin, 2008
- Odothecium Kritsky, Boeger & Jégu, 1997
- Onchobdella Paperna, 1968

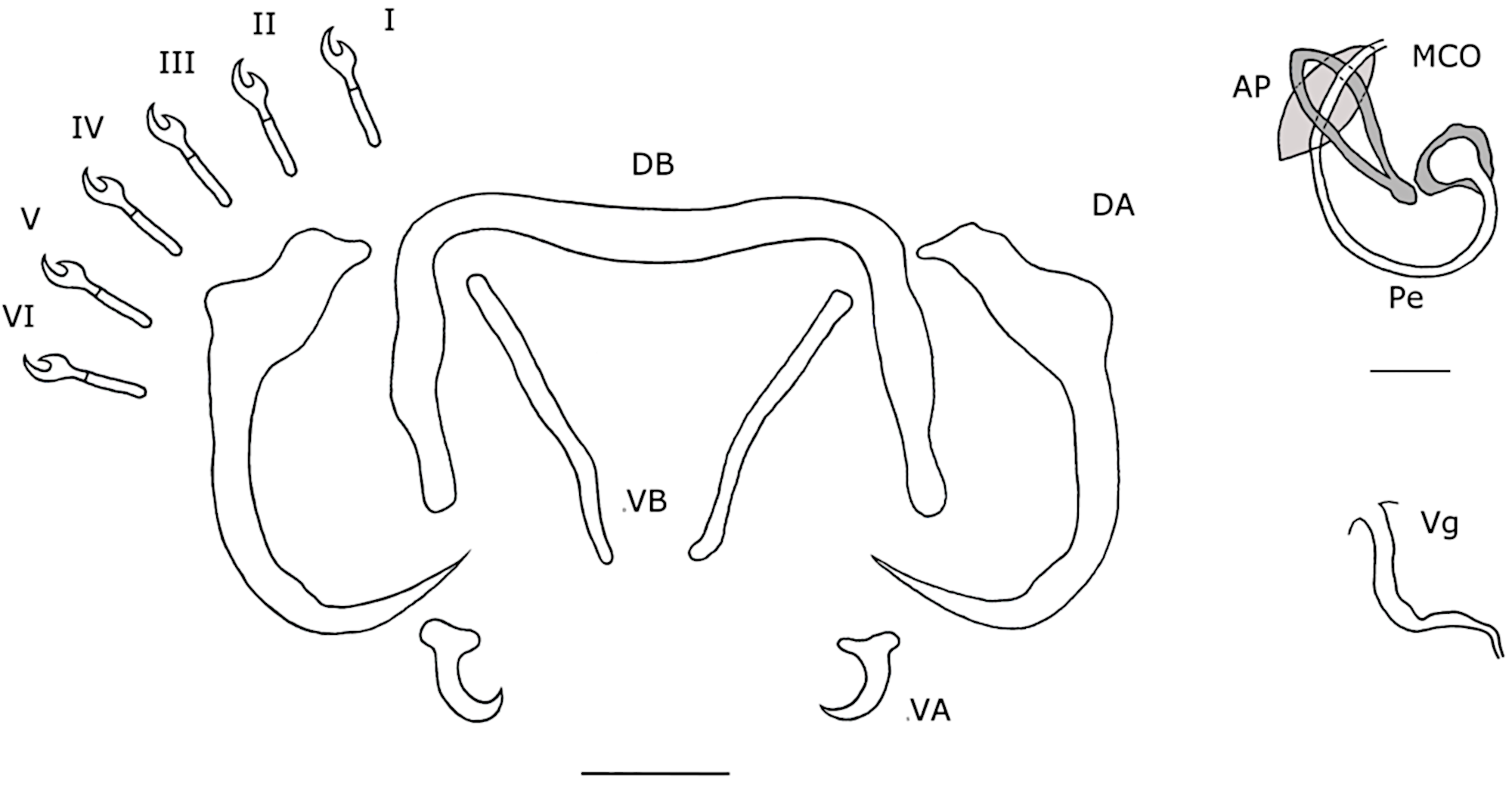
Haptoral and genital sclerotized structures of Onchobdella ximenae

- Onchocleidus Mueller, 1936
- Palombitrema Price & Bussing, 1968
- Paradiplectanotrema Gerasev, Gayevskaya & Kovaleva, 1987
- Paraeuryhaliotrema Mendoza-Franco, Simões, Vidal-Martínez & Aguirre-Macedo, 2022
- Parancylodiscoides Caballero & Bravo Hollis, 1961
- Parancyrocephaloides Yamaguti, 1938
- Paraneohaliotrema Zhukov, 1976
- Parasciadicleithrum Mendoza-Palmero, Blasco-Costa, Hernández-Mena & Pérez-Ponce de León, 2017
- Pennulituba Řehulková, Justine & Gelnar, 2010
- Philocorydoras Suriano, 1986
- Pithanothecium Kritsky, Boeger & Jégu, 1997
- Placodiscus Paperna, 1972
- Platycephalotrema Kritsky & Nitta, 2019
- Pronotogrammella Cruces, Chero, Sáez & Luque, 2020
- Protancyrocephaloides Burn, 1978
- Protoancyrocephalus Bychowsky, 1957
- Protorhinoxenus Domingues & Boeger, 2002
- Pseudamphibdella Yamaguti, 1958
- Pseudempleurosoma Yamaguti, 1965
- Pseudodactylogyroides Ogawa, 1986
- Pseudodiplectanotrema Gerasev, Gaevskaja & Kovaleva, 1987
- Pseudohaliotrema Yamaguti, 1953
- Pseudotetrancistrum Caballero & Bravo-Hollis, 1961
- Recurvatus Corlis, 2004
- Rhinonastes Kritsky, Thatcher & Boeger, 1988
- Rhinoxenoides Santos Neto, Costa, Soares & Domingues, 2018
- Rhinoxenus Kritsky, Boeger & Thatcher, 1988
- Salsuginus Beverley-Burton, 1984
- Sciadicleithrum Kritsky, Thatcher & Boeger, 1989
- Sclerocleidoides Agrawal, Yadav & Kritsky, 2001
- Scutogyrus Pariselle & Euzet, 1995

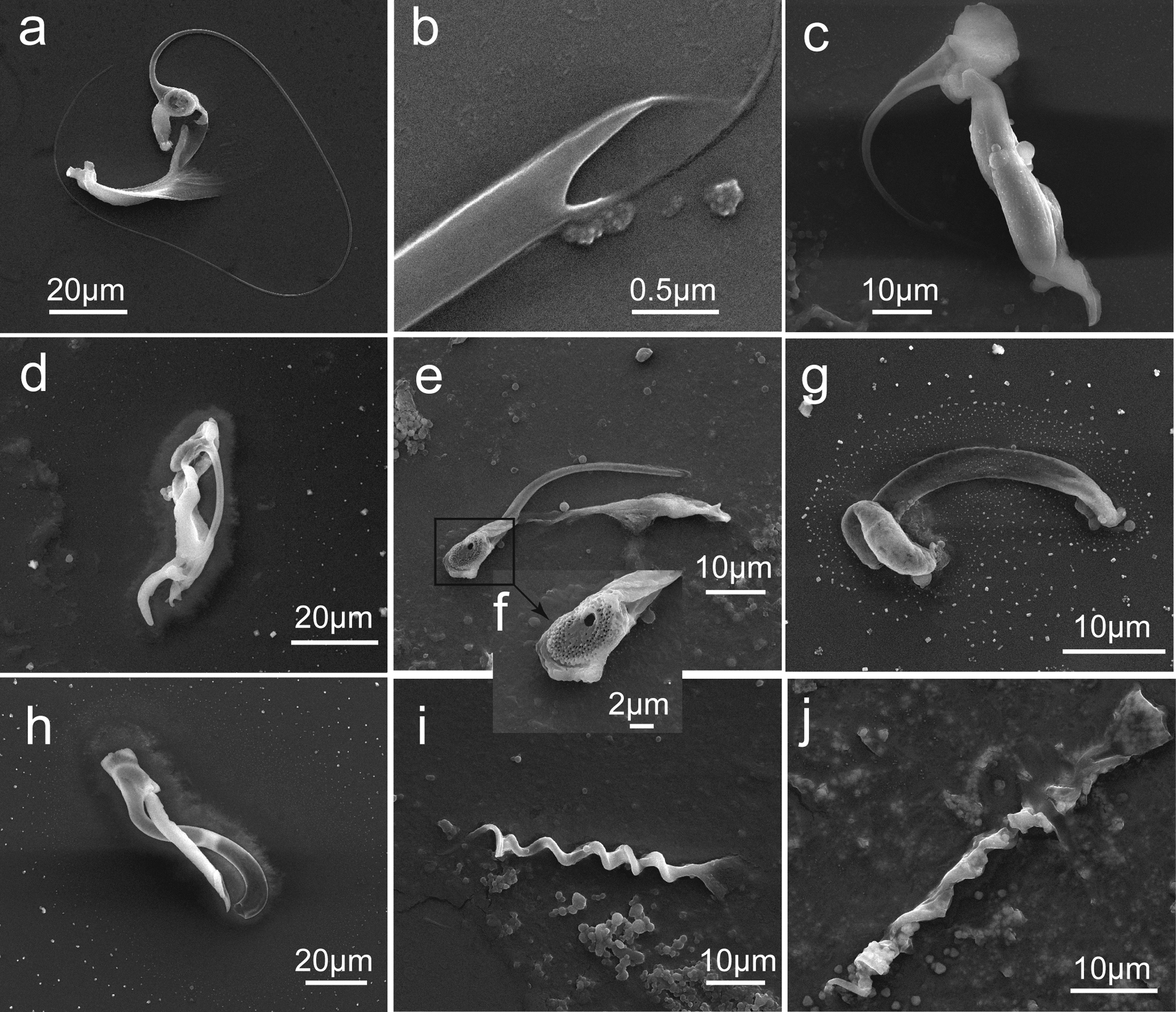
Scanning electron microscopy of sclerotised parts of various species of Cichlidogyrus, Scutogyrus, and Enterogyrus

- Sundatrema Lim & Gibson, 2009
- Susanlimae Boeger, Pariselle & Patella, 2015
- Susanlimocotyle Soares, Domingues & Adriano, 2020
- Syncleithrium Price, 1967
- Telethecium Kritsky, Van Every & Boeger, 1996
- Tereancistrum Kritsky, Thatcher & Kayton, 1980
- Tetracleidus Mueller, 1936
- Tetrancistrum Goto & Kikuchi, 1917
- Thylacicleidus Wheeler & Klassen, 1988
- Triacanthinella Bychowsky & Nagibina, 1968
- Trianchoratus Price & Berry, 1966
- Tribaculocauda Tripathi, 1959
- Trinibaculum Kritsky, Thatcher & Kayton, 1980
- Trinidactylus Hanek, Molnár & Fernando, 1974
- Tucunarella Mendoza-Franco, Scholz & Rozkosná, 2010
- Tylosuricola Unnithan, 1964
- Urocleidoides Mizelle & Price, 1964
- Urocleidus Mueller, 1934
- Vancleaveus Kritsky, Thatcher & Boeger, 1986
- Volsellituba Řehulková, Justine & Gelnar, 2010
- Whittingtonocotyle Neto, Rodrigues & Domingues, 2015
- Williamsius Rogers, 2016
- Xenoligophoroides Dmitrieva, Sanna, Piras, Garippa & Merella, 2018
