= Aristocleidus =

- Aristocleidus mexicanus

Scientific classification
- Kingdom: Animalia
- Phylum: Platyhelminthes
- Class: Monogenea
- Order: Dactylogyridea
- Family: Ancyrocephalidae
- Genus: Aristocleidus; Mueller, 1936

Type species
- Aristocleidus hastatus Mueller, 1936

Species
- See text

Genus of flatworms

Aristocleidus is a genus of monogeneans erected by Justus F. Mueller in 1936. The genus has been revised by Delane C. Kritsky and Edgar F. Mendoza–Franco in 2008. The amended generic diagnosis is: species with gonads overlapping, ventral anchors with deeply incised base forming deep and superficial roots, a coiled tube of the male copulatory organ (nonarticulated with the accessory piece) in a clockwise orientation, and haptoral hooks with upright acute thumb, slender shank comprising one subunit and FH loop.

Two new species, parasitic in the Mexican mojarra Eugerres mexicanus (Perciformes, Gerreidae) from southwestern Mexico have been described by Edgar F. Mendoza-Franco, Marina Tapia Osorio and Juan Manuel Caspeta-Mandujano in 2015.

== Species ==
- Aristocleidus hastatus Mueller, 1936
- Aristocleidus lamothei Kritsky & Mendoza-Franco, 2008
- Aristocleidus mexicanus Mendoza-Franco, Osorio & Caspeta-Mandujano, 2015
- Aristocleidus lacantuni Mendoza-Franco, Osorio & Caspeta-Mandujano, 2015
