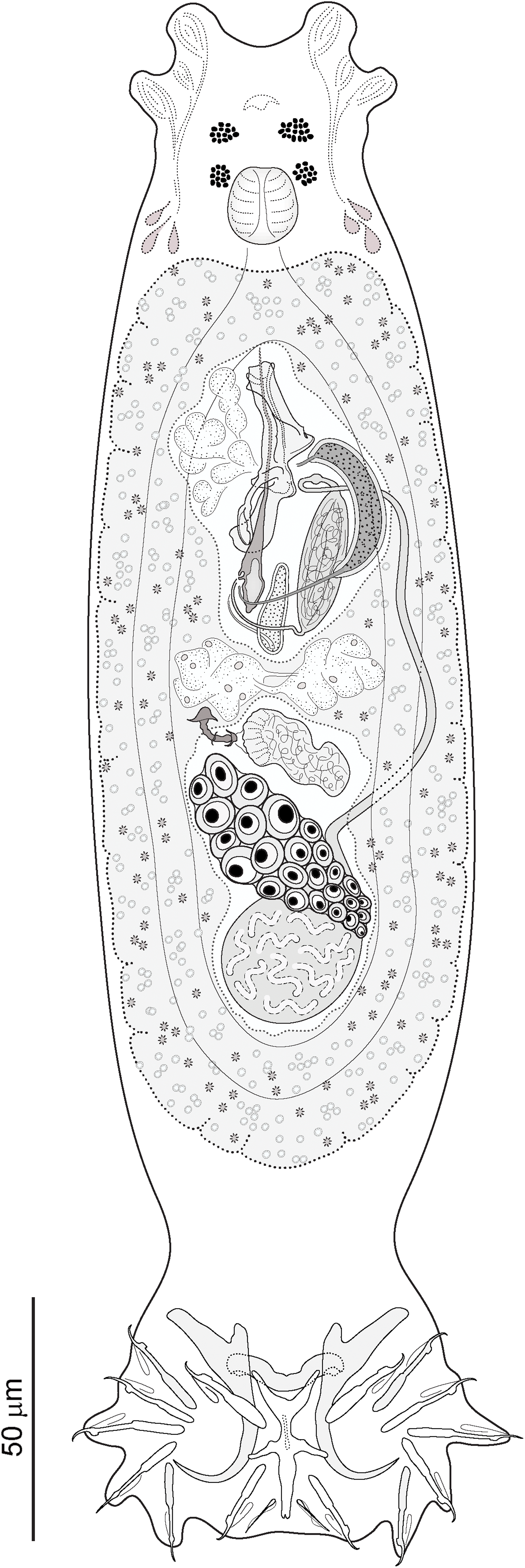
- Dactylogyrus sp.

Scientific classification
- Kingdom: Animalia
- Phylum: Platyhelminthes
- Class: Monogenea
- Order: Dactylogyridea
- Family: Dactylogyridae; Bychowsky, 1933

= Dactylogyridae =

Family of flatworms

Dactylogyridae is a family of monogenean flatworms.

== Genera ==
- Acolpenteron Fischthal & Allison, 1940
- Bivaginogyrus Gusev & Gerasev, 1986
- Dactylogyroides Gusev, 1963
- Dactylogyrus Diesing, 1850
- Dicrodactylogyrus Lu & Lang, 1981
- Dogielius Bychowsky, 1936
- Ecnomotrema Kritsky, 2023
- Leptonchides Chen, 1987
- Markewitschiana Allamuratov & Koval, 1966
- Paracolpenteron Mendoza-Franco, Caspeta-Mandujano & Ramírez-Martínez, 2018
- Pellucidhaptor Price & Mizelle, 1964
- Pleuronectitrema Kritsky, 2023
- Pseudacolpenteron Bychowsky & Gusev, 1955
- Thaparogyrus Gusev, 1976
