= Susanlimae =

Scientific classification
- Kingdom: Animalia
- Phylum: Platyhelminthes
- Class: Monogenea
- Order: Dactylogyridea
- Family: Ancyrocephalidae
- Genus: Susanlimae; Boeger, Pariselle & Patella, 2015
- Species: S. ianwhittingtoni

Binomial name
- Susanlimae ianwhittingtoni Boeger, Pariselle & Patella, 2015

Genus of flatworms

Susanlimae is a genus of monopisthocotylean monogeneans in the family Ancyrocephalidae (or Dactylogyridae, according to the classification used).

The etymology of the genus name is an homage to the Malaysian parasitologist Susan Lim. The authors stated that Dr. Lim was greatly responsible for most of our knowledge of the diversity of Monogenea from Asian Siluriformes.

== Species ==
The genus Susanlimae includes the single species Susanlimae ianwhittingtoni, which is also the type-species. The specific epithet of the species was given in honor of the late Dr. Ian Whittington of the South Australian Museum and University of Adelaide; the authors wrote that "Dr. Whittington passed away too soon, but not before making an impressive contribution to the biology, taxonomy, and phylogeny of Monogenoidea, especially those of Capsalidae."
