= Alexandr Vladimirovich Gussev =

Russian parasitologist (1917–1999)

- Александр Владимирович Гусев
- Born: 5 July 1917; Korocha, Russia
- Died: 31 December 1999 (aged 82); Saint Petersburg, Russia
- Scientific career
- Fields: Parasitology, Helminthology
- Institutions: Russian Academy of Sciences, Leningrad

Alexandr Vladimirovich Gussev (Александр Владимирович Гусев, 5 July 1917 – 31 December 1999), sometimes spelled Gusev in the literature, was a Russian helminthologist specialist of monogeneans.

Gussev was a student of the soviet parasitologist V. A. Dogiel. He worked at the Zoological Institute in Leningrad, then Saint Petersburg, Russia. He received his PhD in 1953 and his DrSc in 1973. Gussev wrote more than 220 publications, dealing with systematics, faunistics, morphology, development, biology and zoogeography of fish parasites.

Gussev is mainly known for his work on the Monogenea, a group of Platyhelminthes parasitic on freshwater and marine fish. He was one of the world leader in this field and described more than 200 new species of monogeneans. He also authored a handbook on methods of collecting monogeneans.

== Honours ==
- Certificate of Honour from the Preasidium of the Academy of Sciences of the USSR
- Honorary member of the American Society of Parasitologists (1978)
- Honorary member of the Czechoslovakia Parasitological Society (1990)

== Political engagement ==
Gussev protested against the invasion of Czechoslovakia by Soviet forces in 1968.

== Taxa named on his honour ==
Although a simple transliteration of his name in Russian (Гусев) is Gusev (with a single s), the pronunciation in Russian is Gussev (as with two s) and citations in the Western literature generally use this spelling. Hence, the many taxa created in the honour of Gussev are usually named gussevi. The list of species includes Ancyrocephalus gussevi Dontsov, 1972, Bravohollisia gussevi Lim, 1995, Calydiscoides gussevi Oliver, 1984, Cosmetocleithrum gussevi Kritsky, Thatcher & Boeger, 1986, Dactylogyroides gussevi Hossain, Chandra & Mohanta, 2001, Dactylogyroides gussevia Singh, Anuradha & Arya, 2003, Diplozoon gussevi Glaser & Glaser, 1964, Dogielius gussevi Singh & Jain, 1988, Gyrodactyloides gussevi Bychowsky & Polyansky, 1953, Lamellodiscus gussevi Sanfilippo, 1978, Ligophorus gussevi Miroshnichenko & Maltsev, 2004, Mazocraes gussevi Agrawal & Sharma, 1989, Microcotyle gussevi Gupta & Krishna, 1980, Protogyrodactylus gussevi Bychowsky & Nagibina, 1974, Silurodiscoides gussevi Singh, Kumari & Agrawal, 1992, Trianchoratus gussevi Lim, 1987. All these species names designate monogeneans. However, the species names Lepeophtheirus gusevi Moon & Kim, 2012, a copepod, and Neopavlovskioides gusevi Rodyuk, 1986, a monogenean, are based on the spelling with a single s.

Gussev is also honoured by a genus name, Gussevia Kohn & Paperna, 1964. Gussevia was considered a junior synonym of Urocleidoides Mizelle and Price, 1964 by Kritsky and Thatcher in 1983 but was resurrected and is now valid. Gussevia is a genus of monogenean parasites of Neotropical cichlid fishes.

== List of principal works ==
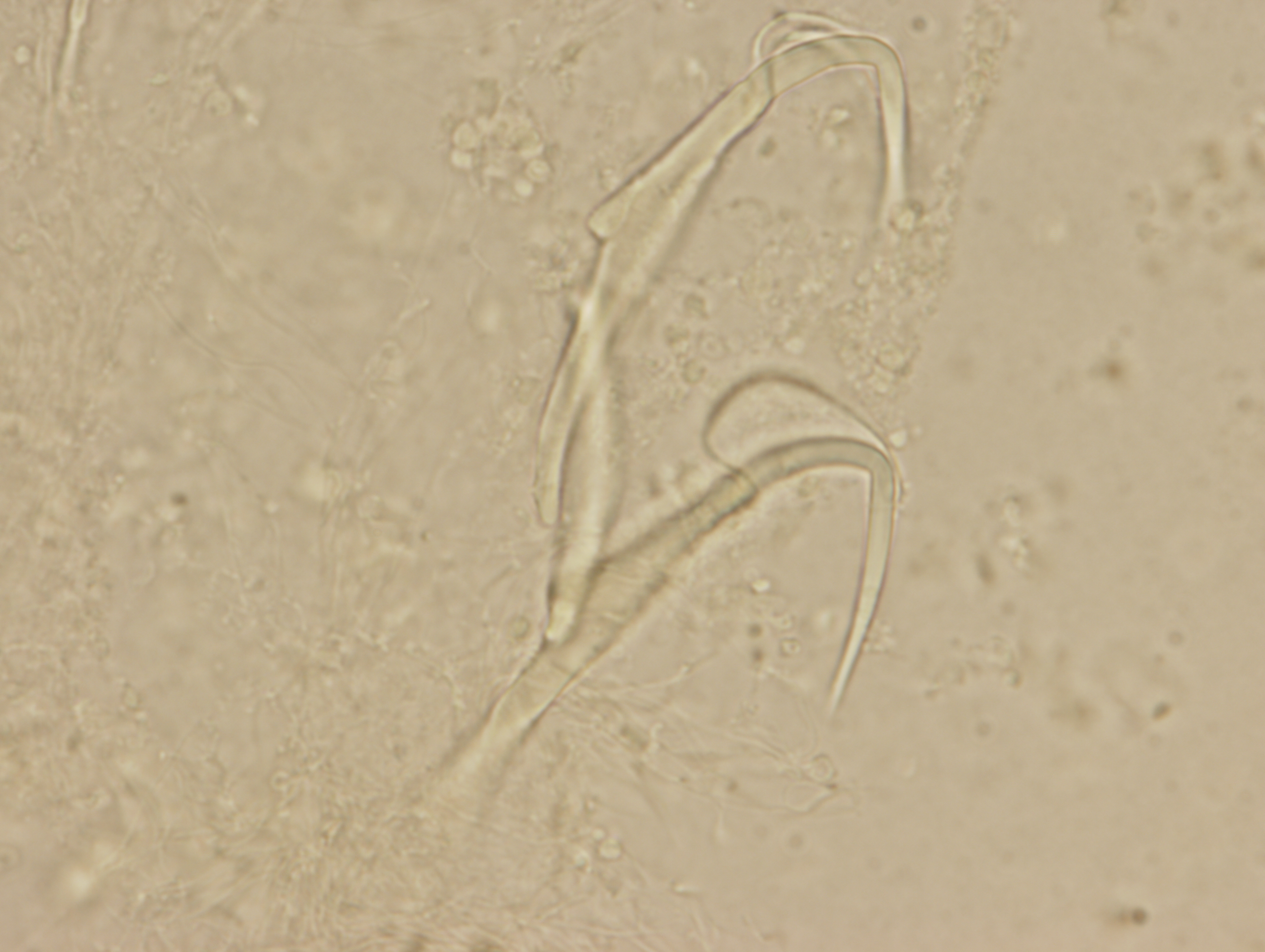
Dactylogyrus baueri Gussev, 1955, a species of dactylogyrid Monogenea described by Gussev

This is list from a webpage in the Zoological Institute of Saint Peterburg. (note the use of 'Gusev' - with single s).

- Gusev A.V. Materials on the monogenetic trematodes of the Amur River. Trudy Zoologicheskogo Instituta AN SSSR, 1953; 13: 127-136.
- Gusev A.V. Monogenetic trematodes of fish of the Amur river system. Trudy Zoologicheskogo Instituta AN SSSR, 1955; 19: 172-398.
- Gusev A.V. New species of monogenetic trematodes from the gills of Squaliobarbus curriculus from rivers of China. Trudy Zoologicheskogo Instituta AN SSSR, 1955; 21: 119-124.
- Gusev A.V. New species of Monogenoidea from fishes of Ceylon. Bulletin of the Fisheries Research Station, Ceylon, 1963; 16: 53-93.
- Ergens R. and Gusev A.V. Dactylogyrus prostae Molnar, 1964 (Monogenoidea) aus den Kiemen von Leuciscus cephalus (L.) und Leuciscus cephalis orientalis Nordmann. Ceskoslovenska Parasitologie, 1965; 12:323-325.
- Gavrilova N.G. and Gusev A.V., and Dzhalilov U. Dactylogyrids from Capoetobrama kuschakewitschi (Kessler). Trudy Zoologicheskogo Instituta AN SSSR, 1965; 35: 132-136.
- Gusev A.V. Dactylogyrids from Capoetobrama kuschakewitschi (Kessler). Trudy Zoologicheskogo Instituta AN SSSR, 1965; 35: 132-136.
- Gusev A.V. Dactylogyrids from Tinca tinca (L.). Trudy Zoologicheskogo Instituta AN SSSR, 1965; 35: 126-131.
- Gusev A.V. Some new species of Dactylogyrus from the European freshwater fishes. Folia Parasitologica, 1966; 13(4): 289-321.
- Glaser H.-J. and Gusev A.V. Certain errors in the system of classification of European dactylogyrids. Parasitologiya, 1967; 1(6): 535-438.
- Gusev A.V. New species of Dactylogyrus from fishes of the Far East. Parazitologicheskii Sbornik, 1967; 23: 250-255.
- Gusev A.V. Two new Gyrodactylus species (Monogenoidea) from Cyprinid fishes from the Eastern USSR. Folia Parasitologica, 1975; 22(1): 85-87.
- Gusev A.V. Freshwater Indian Monogenoidea. Principles of systematics, analysis of the world faunas and their evolution. Indian Journal of Helminthology, 1976; 25/26: 1-241.
- Gusev A.V. Gyrodactylus costatae sp.n. (Gyrodactylidae: Monogenoidea) from Lefua costata (Kessler) . Folia Parasitologica, 1976; 23(2): 186.
- Gusev A.V. Monogenoidea of freshwater fishes. Principles of systematics, analysis of world fauna and its evolution. Parazitologicheskii Sbornik, 1978; 28: 96-198.
- Gusev A.V. Gyrodactylus incognitus sp.n. (Monogenoidea) from Noemacheilus strauchi from Middle Asia. Folia Parasitologica, 1980; 27(1): 91-92.
- Aligadzhiev A.D.; Gusev A.V., and Kazieva N.Sh. A new species of monogeneans from gills of Rutilus rutilus caspicus. Parasitologiya, 1984; 18(5): 412-415.
- Gusev A.V. and Dzhalilov U.D. A new species of Dactylogyrus (Monogenea) from Varicorhinus. Parasitologiya, 1984; 18(6): 487-488.
- Krasyukova Z.V. and Gusev A.V. Description of a new species Gyrinocheilus monchadskii sp.n. (Cypriniformes, Gyrinocheilidae) and a new species of its parasite the Monogenea Dactylogyrus lindbergi sp. n. (Dactylogyridea, Dactylogyridae). Trudy Zoologicheskogo Instituta AN SSSR, 1987; 162: 67-72.
- Gusev A.V., Jalali B. and Molnar K. New and known species of Dactylogyrus Diesing, 1850 (Monogenea, Dactylogyridae) from Iranian freshwater cyprinid fishes. Systematic Parasitology, 1993; 25: 221-228.
- Gusev A.V., Ali N.M., Abdul-Ameer K.N., Amin S.M., and Molnar K. New and known species of Dactylogyrus Diesing, 1850 (Monogenea, Dactylogyridae) from cyprinid fishes of the River Tigris, Iraq. Systematic Parasitology, 1993; 25: 229-237.
- Gusev A.V. Six new species of the genus Dactylogyrus (Monogenea: Dactylogyridae) from Iranian freshwater fishes. Zoosystematica Rossica, 1993; 2(1): 29-35.
