= Scutogyrus vanhovei =

Scientific classification
- Kingdom: Animalia
- Phylum: Platyhelminthes
- Class: Monogenea
- Order: Dactylogyridea
- Family: Ancyrocephalidae
- Genus: Scutogyrus
- Species: S. vanhovei

Binomial name
- Scutogyrus vanhovei Pariselle, Nyom & Bilong, 2013

Species of flatworm

Scutogyrus vanhovei is a species of monopisthocotylean monogenean in the family Ancyrocephalidae. It is known to Tilapia species, particularly Tilapia mariae, and was first found in Cameroon. It can be differentiated from its cogenerates by the presence of a distinct swollen portion of its penis.

== Etymology ==
The species was named in honor of a PhD student, Maarten M. P. Vanhove, who is "working on monogenean species of cichlid fishes from Lake Tanganyika".
