= Ameloblastella =

Scientific classification
- Kingdom: Animalia
- Phylum: Platyhelminthes
- Class: Monogenea
- Order: Dactylogyridea
- Family: Ancyrocephalidae
- Genus: Ameloblastella; Kritsky, Mendoza-Franco & Scholz, 2000

Species
- Ameloblastella pseudovancleaveus França, Issac, Pavandli & Takemoto, 2003

Genus of flatworms

Ameloblastella is a genus of monogeneans belonging to the family Ancyrocephalidae.

All members of the genus are parasitic on fish.

== Species ==
The following species are considered valid according to WoRMS:

- Ameloblastella amazonica Negreiros, Tavares-Dias & Pereira, 2019
- Ameloblastella chavarriai (Price, 1938) Kritsky, Mendoza-Franco & Scholz, 2000
- Ameloblastella edentensis Mendoza-Franco, Mendoza-Palmero & Scholz, 2016
- Ameloblastella formatrium Mendoza-Franco, Mendoza-Palmero & Scholz, 2016
- Ameloblastella mamaevi (Kritsky & Thatcher, 1976) Kritsky, Mendoza-Franco & Scholz, 2000
- Ameloblastella martinae Mendoza-Palmero, Rossin, Irigoitia & Scholz, 2020
- Ameloblastella paranaensis (França, Isaac, Pavanelli & Takemoto, 2003) Mendoza-Franco & Scholz, 2009
- Ameloblastella peruensis Mendoza-Franco, Mendoza-Palmero & Scholz, 2016
- Ameloblastella pirarara Matthews, Domingues, Maia, Silva, Adriano & Aguiar, 2021
- Ameloblastella platensis (Suriano & Incorvaia, 1995) Kritsky, Mendoza-Franco & Scholz, 2000
- Ameloblastella satoi Monteiro, Kritsky & Brasil-Sato, 2010
- Ameloblastella unapi Mendoza-Franco & Scholz, 2009
- Ameloblastella unapioides Mendoza-Franco, Mendoza-Palmero & Scholz, 2016
