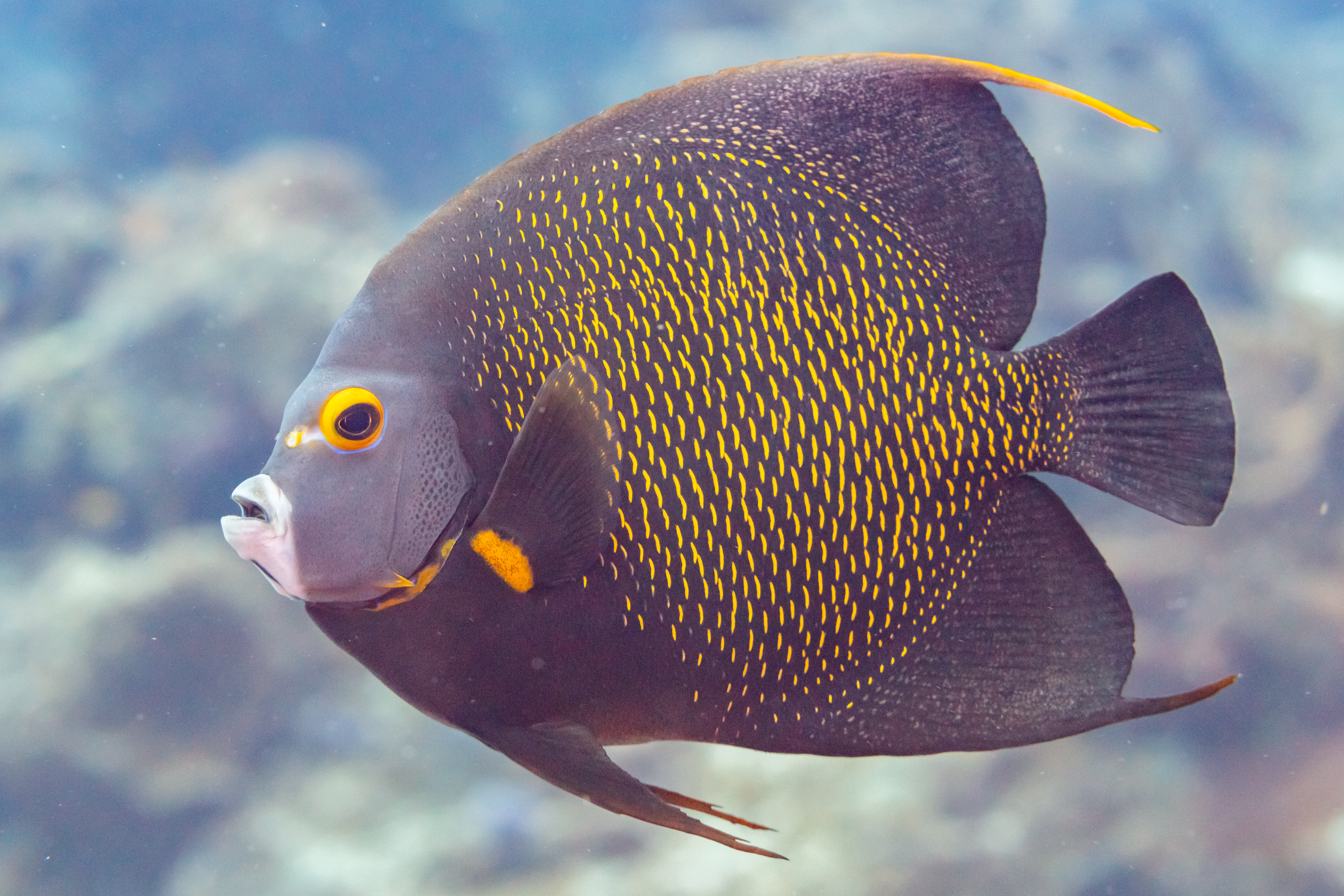

Conservation status
- Least Concern (IUCN 3.1)

Scientific classification
- Kingdom: Animalia
- Phylum: Chordata
- Class: Actinopterygii
- Division: Teleostei
- Order: Acanthuriformes
- Family: Pomacanthidae
- Genus: Pomacanthus
- Species: P. paru

Binomial name
- Pomacanthus paru (Bloch, 1787)
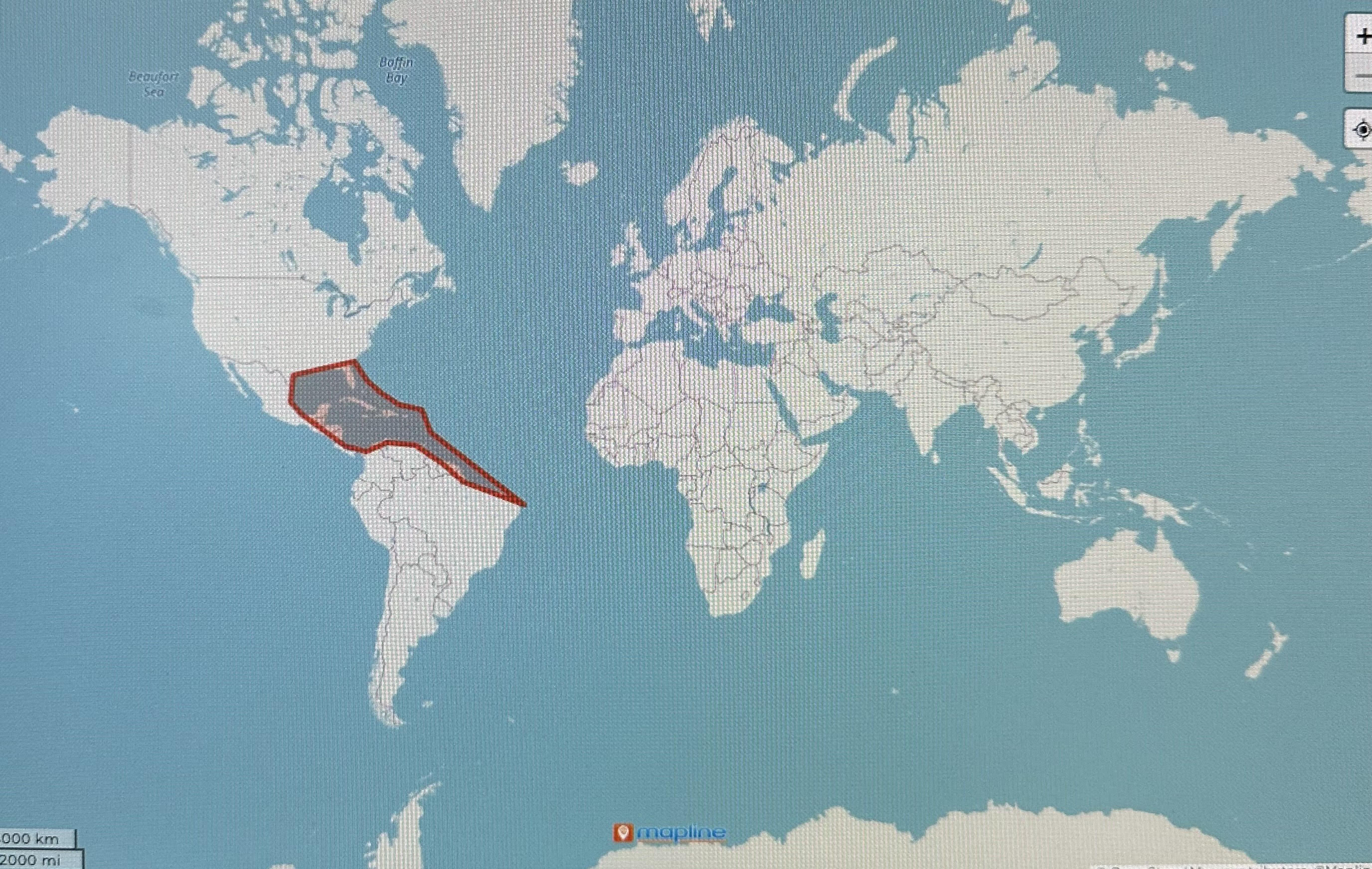
- Range

Synonyms
- Chaetodon paru Bloch, 1787; Chaetodon aureus Bloch, 1787; Pomacanthus aureus (Bloch, 1787)

= French angelfish =

Species of fish

Pomacanthus paru, also known by its common name the French angelfish, is a slow growing coral reef fish from the Caribbean. The species is of the family Pomacanthidae, which contains other species of marine angelfish. Its closest relative is the grey angelfish (P. arcuatus).

== Taxonomy ==
The French angelfish was first formally described as Chaetodon paru by the German physician and naturalist Marcus Elieser Bloch (1723–1799) with the type locality given as Brazil and Jamaica. The species is placed by some authorities in the subgenus Pomacanthus,. The specific name of this species, paru is the Portuguese name for this species.

== Description ==
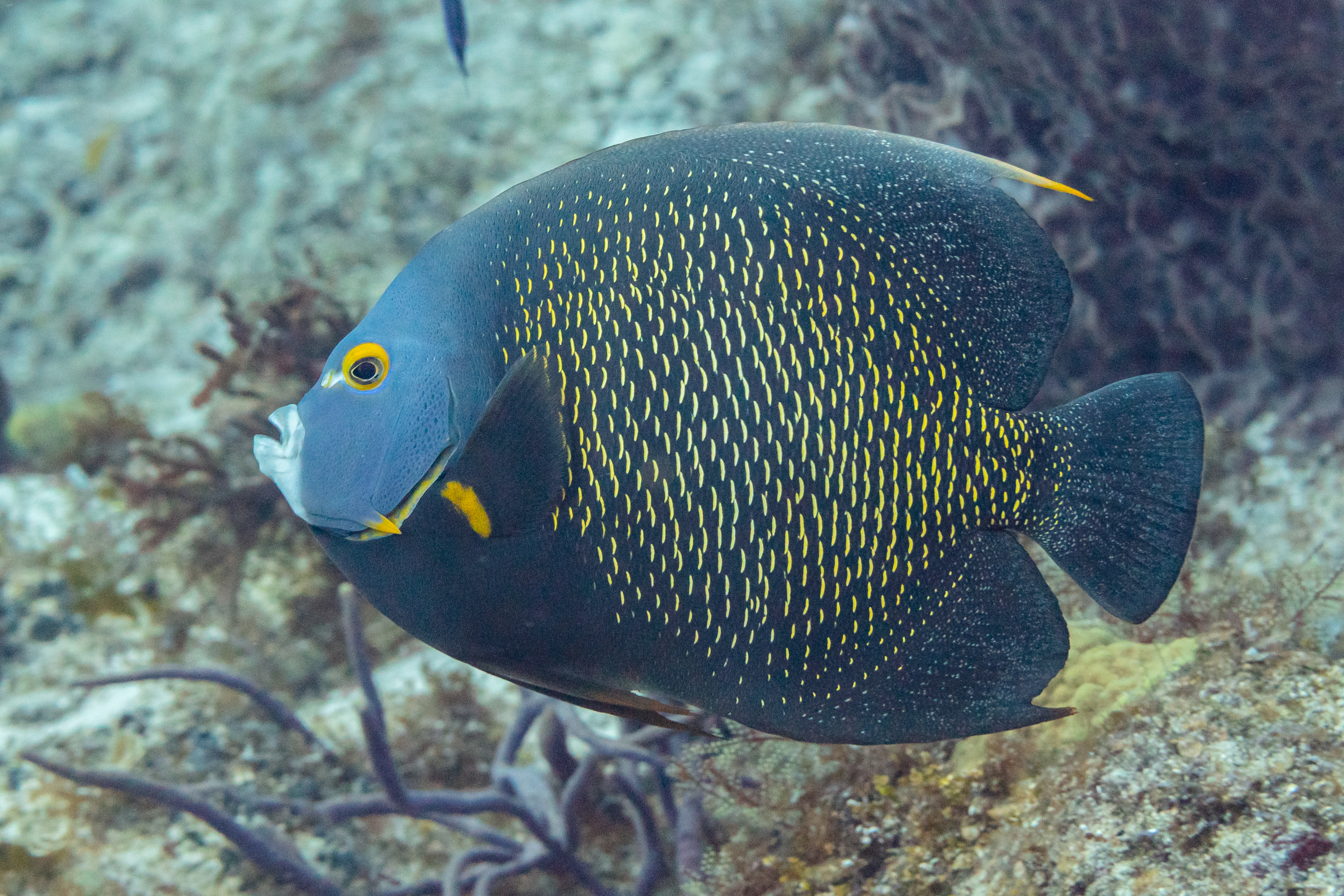
In Cozumel (Mexico)

The French angelfish has a deep but vertically compressed body, making it appear flattened from the front. The head is deep, with a short snout that ends in a small mouth containing numerous bristle-like teeth. There is an obvious spine at the corner of the preoperculum while there are no spines on the operculum or under the eye. The dorsal fin contains 10 spines and 29–31 soft rays while the anal fin contains 3 spines and 22–24 soft rays. This species attains a maximum total length of 41.1 centimetres (16.2 in). Males grow to around 18in (45cm), while females reach a slightly smaller size.

Both males and females have a black or dark gray body that contrasts with the bright yellow tips of their scales on most of their body. They have a white mouth and a yellow orbit. The pectoral fins have a wide orange-yellow band and the dorsal fin has a long yellow filamentous extension growing from its soft-rayed part. Juvenile French angelfish have different markings from adults. Juveniles are almost completely black apart from five vertical yellow bands, that run down the entire height of their body, the first around the mouth and the last at the caudal peduncle.

== Distribution ==
French angelfish can be found in the western Atlantic from Florida to the Gulf of Mexico and down towards Brazil and the Caribbean, including the Antilles, Roatan, and the eastern Atlantic from around Ascension Island and St. Paul's Rocks.

These fish can be seen in water depths above about 15ft, or about 4.5m, and they have also been reported at depths within the mesophotic zone, which is between 30m and 150m, or about 100ft - 500ft.

== Feeding ==
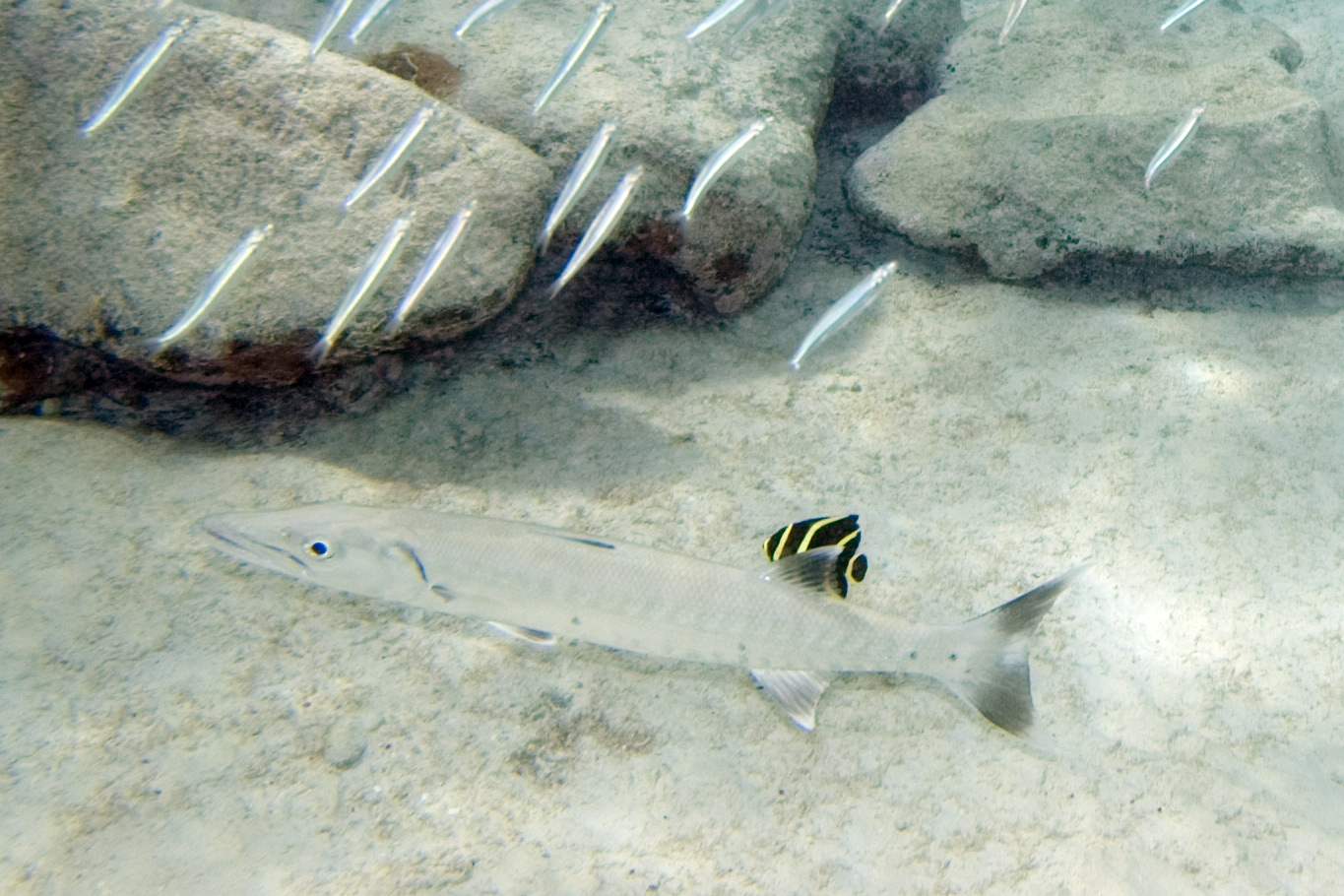
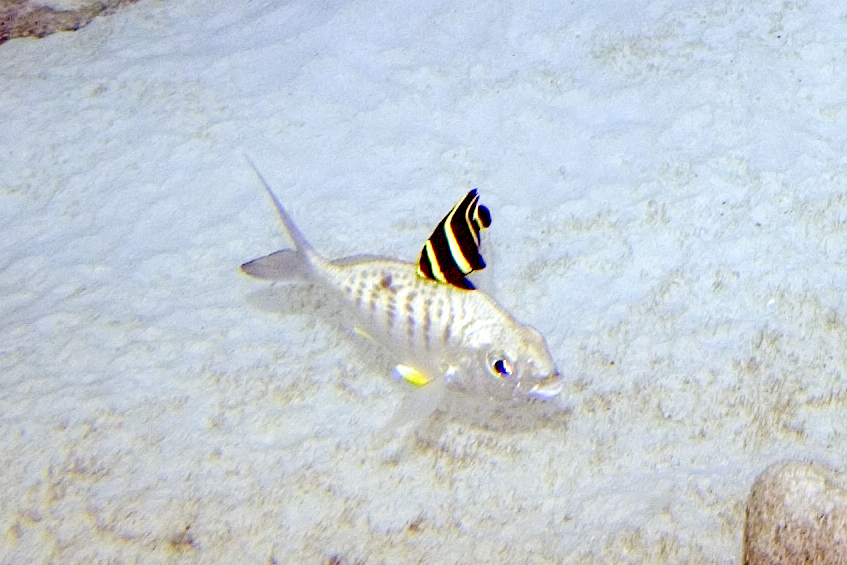
Juvenile cleaning a great barracuda (top) and a yellowfin mojarra (bottom)

French angelfish live in and around coral reefs and rocky shores. As adults, these fish primarily feed on sponges with around 70% of their diet consisting of sponges. The comb-like teeth of adults help to grind up pieces of sponges. In contrast, juvenile French angelfish feed by consuming ectoparasites on larger fishes. As a result, juveniles spend a huge portion of their time at or near their cleaning stations.

As juvenile French angelfish grow in size, they become more generalist when it comes to species of sponge they eat, eating around twelve to fifteen sponge species, which is similar to their adult diet. This shows there is a direct relationship between the size of the juvenile and how much sponges contribute to their diet, with large juveniles eating more sponges than smaller juveniles.

=== Juvenile cleaning stations ===
Like juveniles of some other angelfish species, juvenile French angelfish are well documented cleaner fish; many larger fish species allow or implore them to approach to feed on ectoparasites, mucus, dead tissue, and other undesirable particles.

In the Caribbean, certain patches of the ocean floor may be used by young green sea turtles as "cleaning stations". At such cleaning stations, multiple species of cleaner fish of varying families coexist and provide cleaning services to the turtles as well other fish that seek cleaning services. At these stations, juvenile P. paru primarily clean the sea turtles' heads, carapace, and plastron.

== Biology ==
French angelfish are common on rocky and coral reefs where it is normally encountered in pairs, frequently in the vicinity of sea fans. Its diet comprises sponges, algae, bryozoans, zoantharians, gorgonians, hydroids, coral and tunicates. These pairs are highly territorial, and typically both vigorously defending their territory from their neighbours. Juveniles act as cleaner fish and establish cleaning stations. Species recorded as being clients of juvenile French angelfish, include jacks, snappers, morays, grunts, surgeonfishes and wrasses. These fish are active during the daylight hours, but seek shelter in their designated hiding spot where they return every night. They can produce a knocking sound when alarmed.

In many fish species, the age of an individual can be estimated by analyzing its otoliths. In French angelfish, an opaque band forms on the sagittae otolith with every year of growth. A 2016 study of French angelfish otoliths found that the oldest specimen in the study was 27 years old.

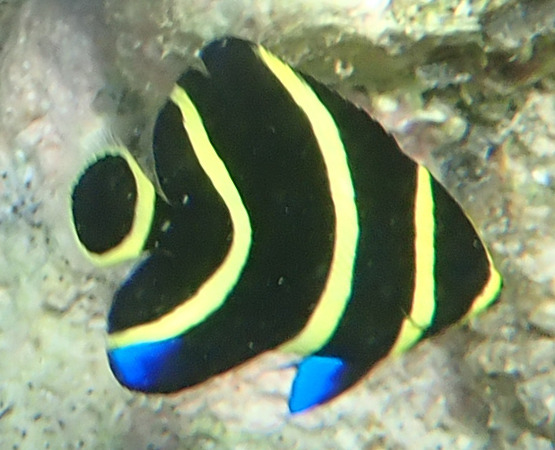
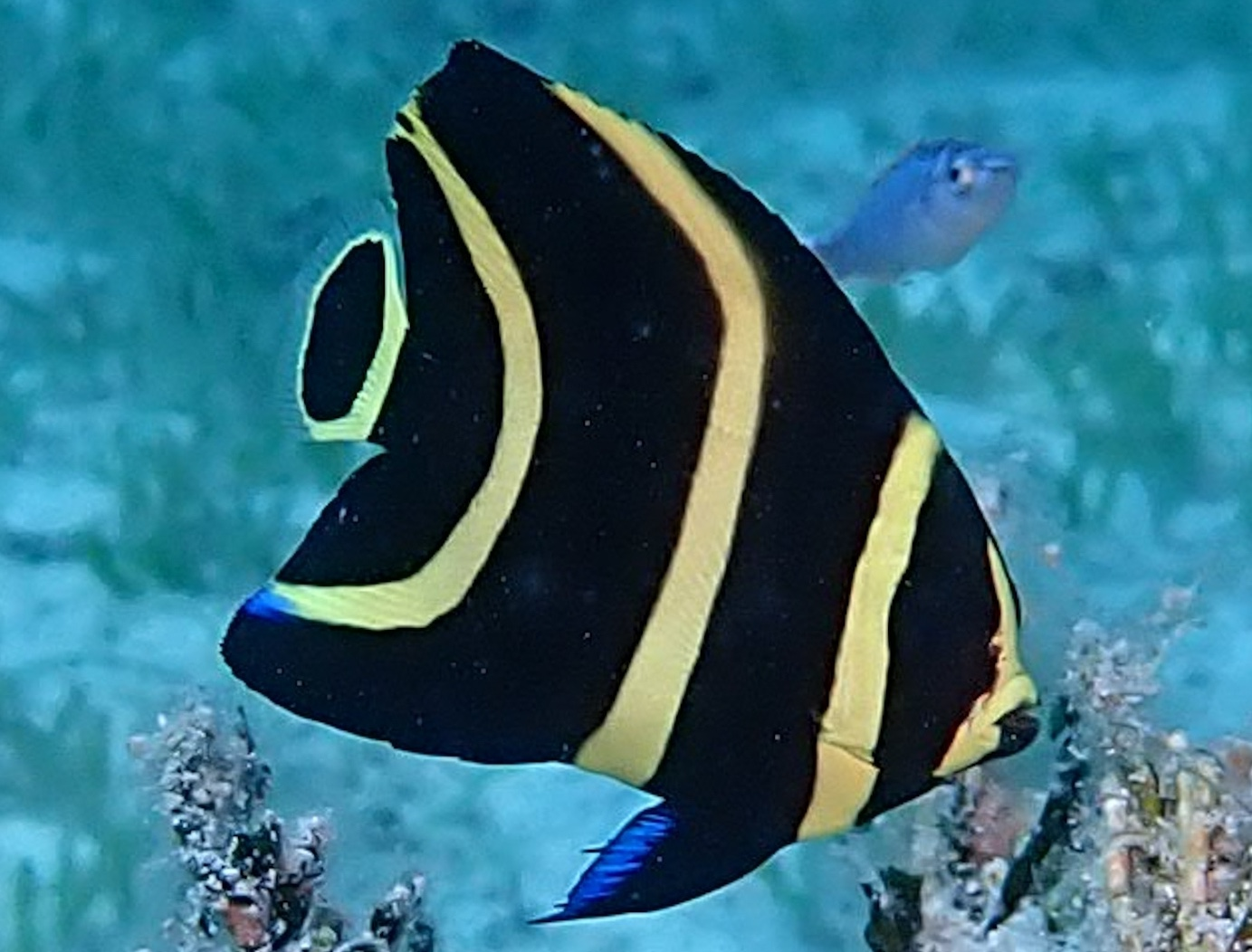
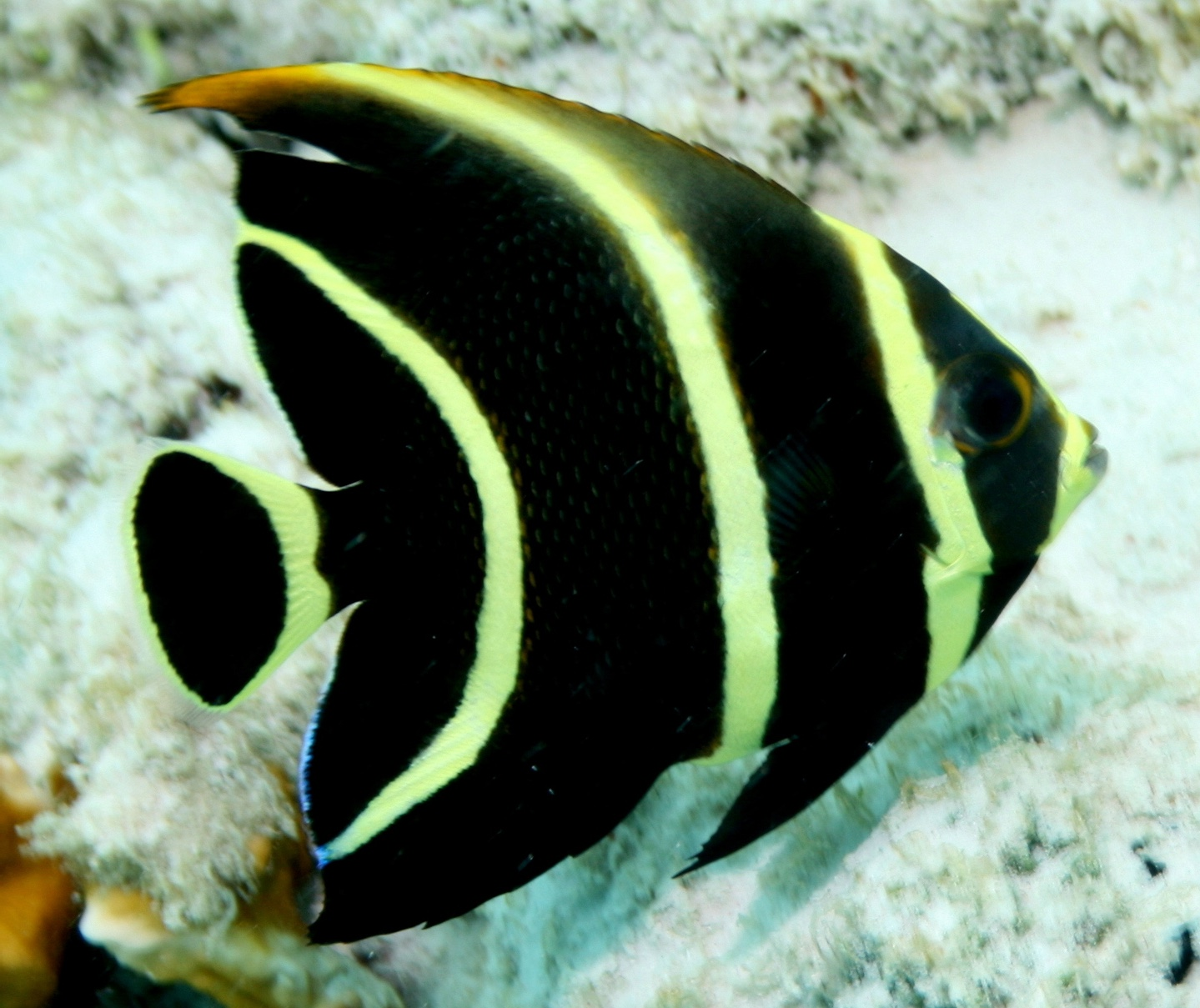
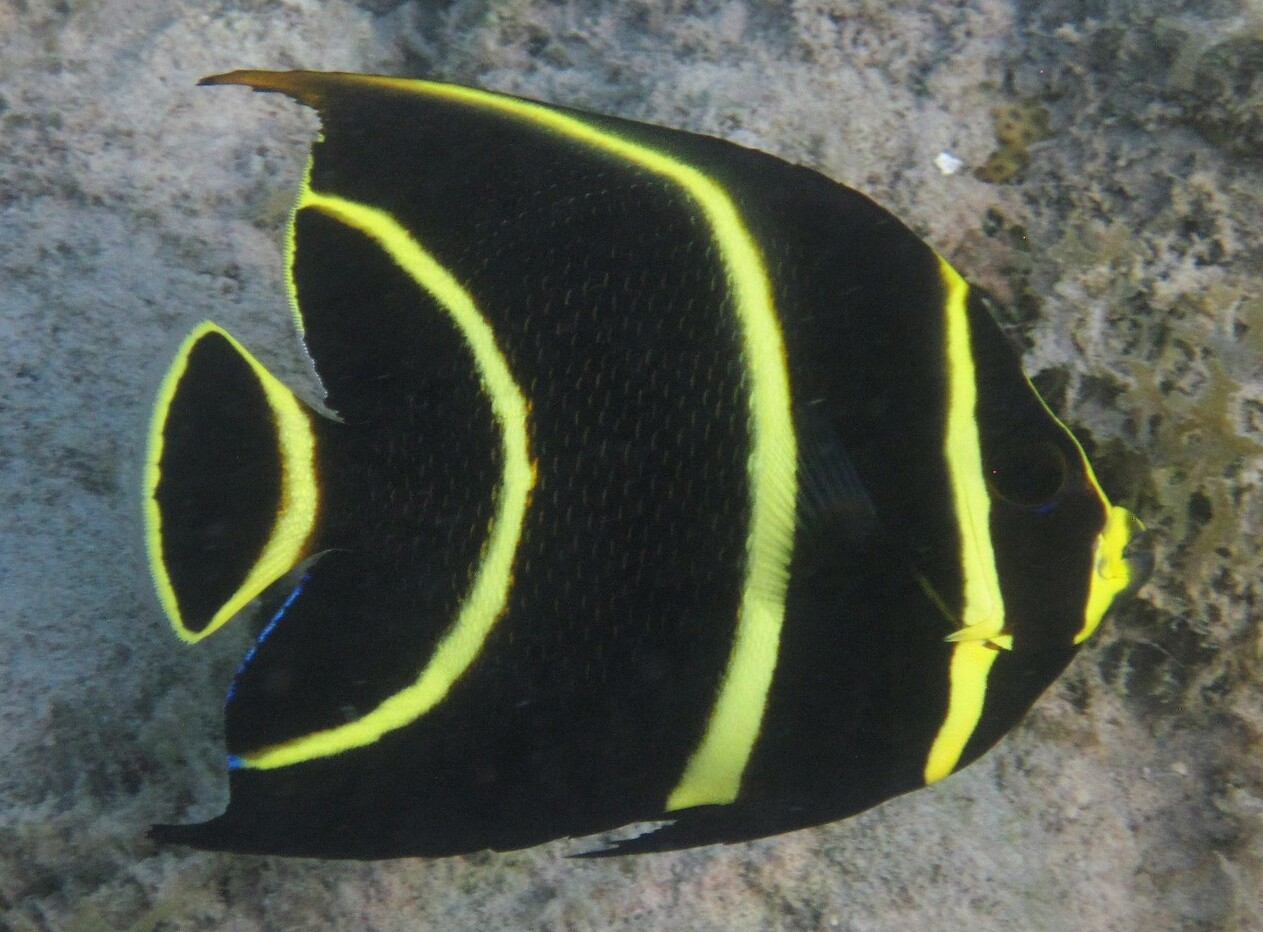
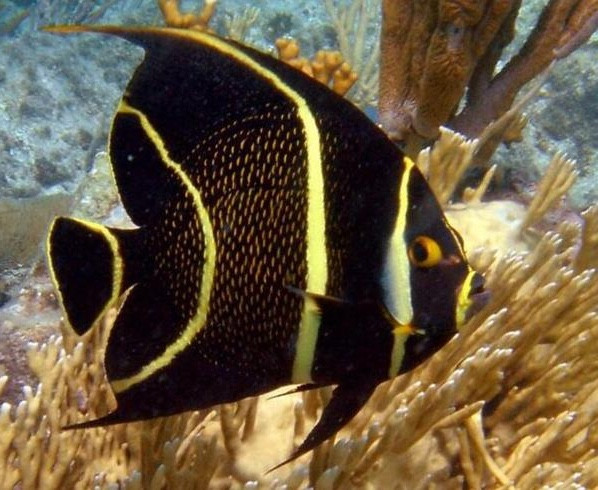
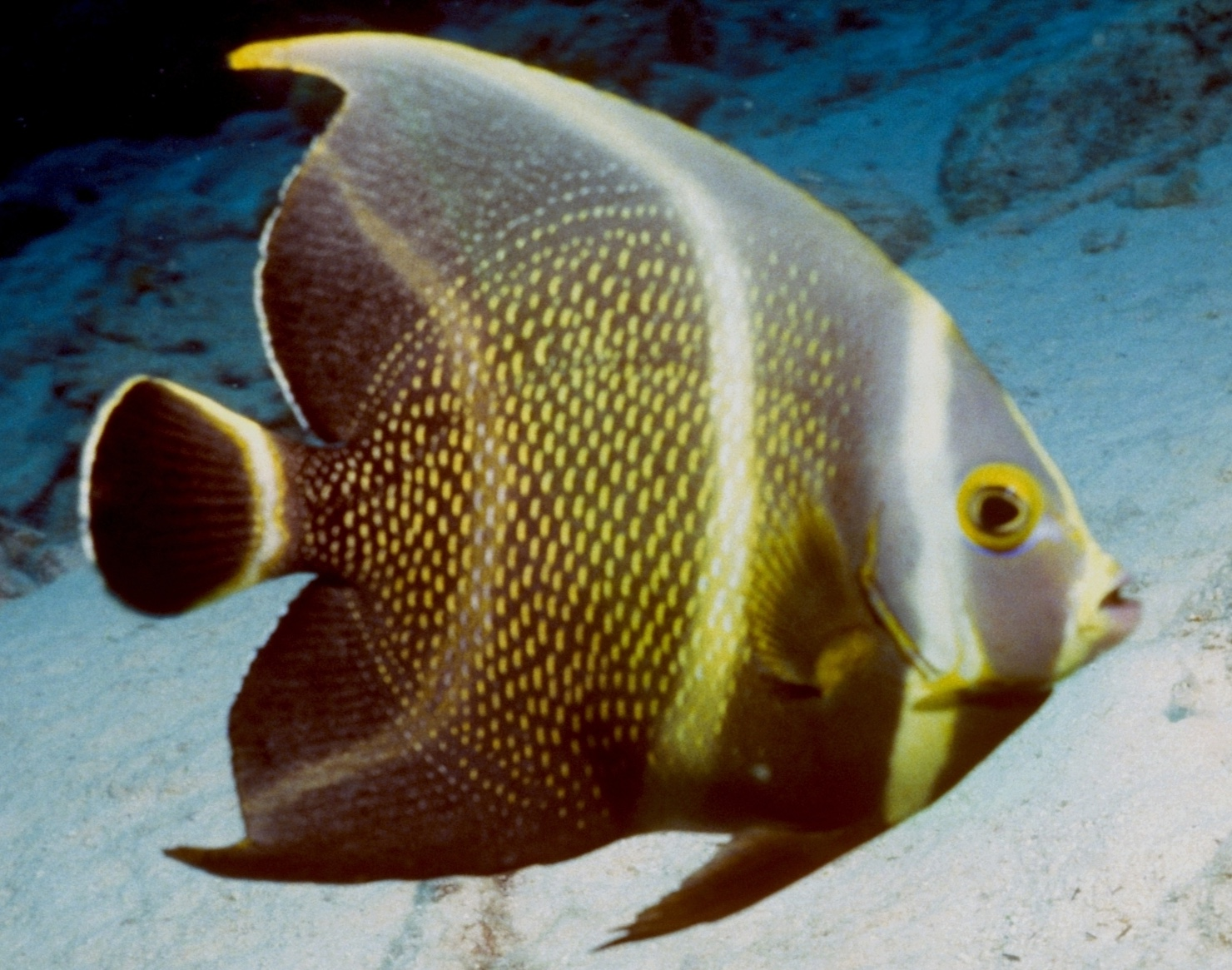
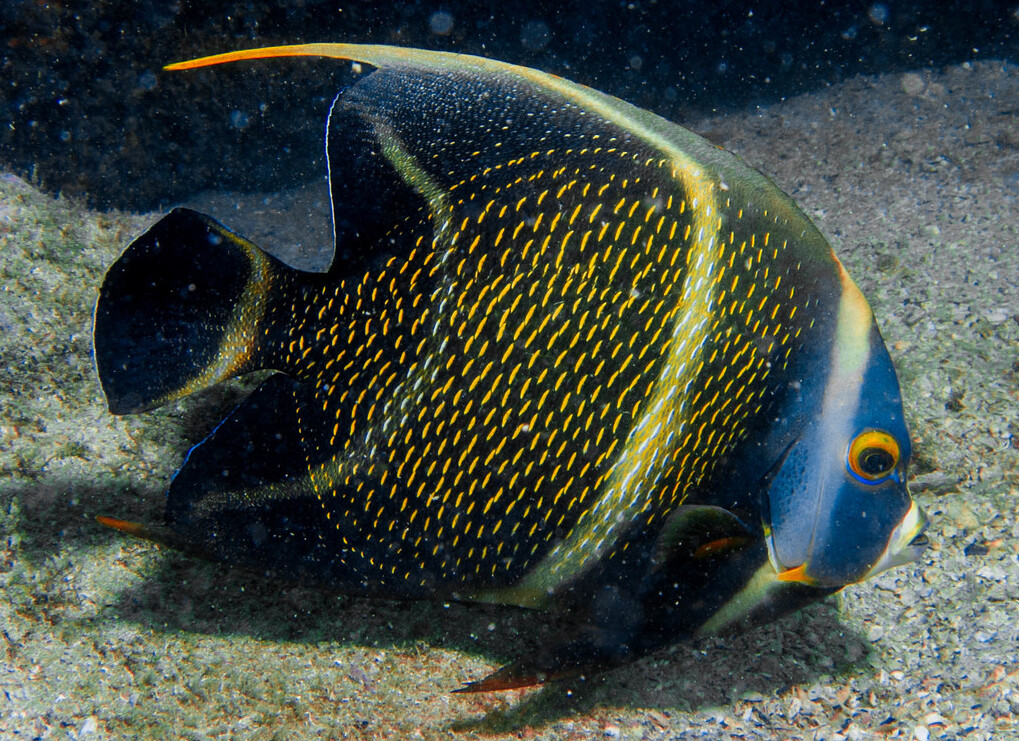
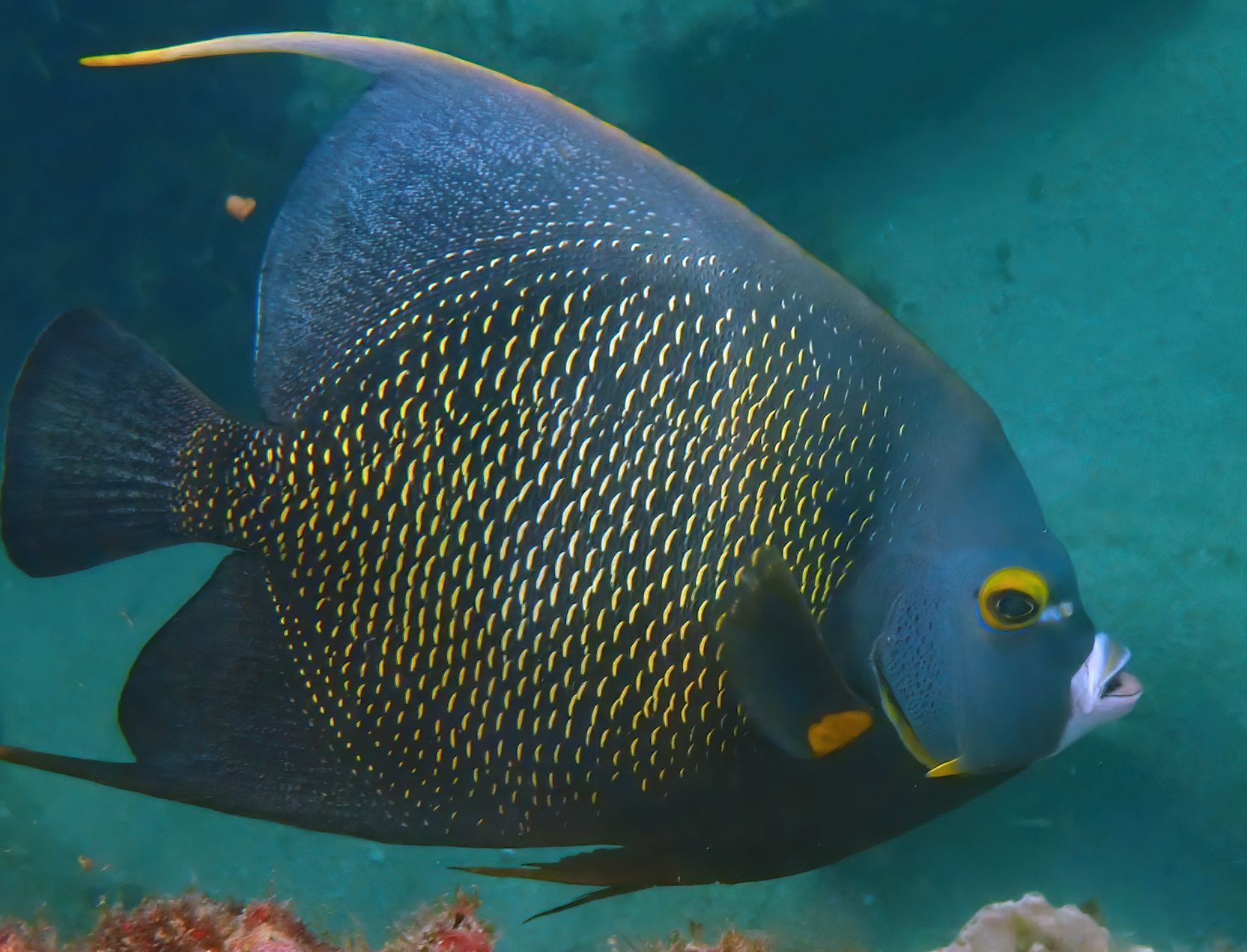
Growth series (from youngest to oldest)

=== Parasites ===
In a captive specimen in Georgia, researchers found endoparasites (parasites that live within the host body) of the genus Enterogyrus on its foregut wall. The way in which these parasites attach themselves to their host was unusual, as the parasites attached themselves perpendicularly to the folds in the foregut.

== Reproduction ==
In French angelfish, there are no obvious courtship displays or clear sexual dimorphism between the sexes. The species forms monogamous pairs, unlike its closest relative, the grey angelfish, which mates in polygamous groups.

Little is known about the mating patterns of P. paru, with it rarely being observed. From what has been observed, the fish, in mating pairs, would swim up the water column, with one in front and one directly behind the other.

This reproductive mating behavior has only ever been reported to occur right around sunset, or dusk. At dusk, the pair swim upwards in a wide, shallow curve from the substrate, travelling around 7 to 10 m horizontally as they climb to a 2 or 3 m (6 ft 7 in or 9 ft 10 in). As they ascend, both angle their bodies slightly, with their vents very close together, even touching. They hold this posture throughout the zenith of their curve separating as they descend. Neighbouring pairs were observed undertaking similar movements above the reef at roughly the same time. The observers were unable to ascertain if gametes were released in these displays. Neighbouring pairs were not seen interfering with these displays. This species is a protogynous hermaphrodite; the female can change sex to become a male if no male is present.

Although French angelfish are sympatric with the closely related grey angelfish, the two species have never been observed to produce hybrid offspring in nature, or even forming mixed groups or pairs. Conversely, grey angelfish may aggressively chase French angelfish. It is hypothesized that this is due to behavioural incompatibility; during agonistic approaches by conspecifics, grey angelfish respond by grouping with them, while French angelfish either continue their aggression or flee.

However, the viability of a hybrid cross between French and grey angelfish has been proven within a laboratory setting; by artificially extracting and mixing gametes, such hybrids were produced in 1976. It was discovered that the juveniles of the resulting artificial hybrids were not clearly distinguishable from juvenile grey angelfish, and as such if natural hybrids did exist, they would not be easy to identify at least as juveniles.

== Conservation ==
According to the IUCN red list of endangered animal species, the French angelfish is currently listed as least concern. However, it is very possible that in the coming years this fish species moves from least concern to near threatened or even vulnerable. This is in large part due to the marine pet trade, also known as the marine ornamental trade. In Brazil alone, the French angelfish is the fifth most exported in the Brazilian fish trade. In addition, French angelfish are also caught as bycatch.

The longevity of large-bodied pomacanthids, their slow growth, their late sexual maturity, along with heavy exploitation of them from the aquarium trade, puts French angelfish and related species at risk of becoming more endangered from human impacts, as the slow rate by which these fish reproduce means they cannot quickly replenish their population.

== Importance to humans ==
The French angelfish is common in the aquarium trade, collection and export to the United States and European markets being common in Brazil. It has been bred in captivity. It is harvested for food, its flesh being considered highly palatable, although it has been reported to be a source of ciguatera poisoning in humans.
