= Cacatuocotyle =

Scientific classification
- Kingdom: Animalia
- Phylum: Platyhelminthes
- Class: Monogenea
- Order: Dactylogyridea
- Family: Ancyrocephalidae
- Genus: Cacatuocotyle; Boeger, Domingues & Kritsky, 1997

Genus of flatworms

Cacatuocotyle is a genus of monogeneans, which includes a small number of species.

== Species ==
(This list is not complete)

- Cacatuocotyle chajuli Franco, Caspeta-Mandujano & Salgado-Maldanado
- Cacatuocotyle exiguum Franco, Caspeta-Mandujano & Salgado-Maldanado
- Cacatuocotyle papilionis Zago, Franceschini, Müller & da Silva, 2018
- Cacatuocotyle paranaensis Boeger, Domingues & Kritsky, 1997
