= Lethrinitrema =

Scientific classification
- Kingdom: Animalia
- Phylum: Platyhelminthes
- Class: Monogenea
- Order: Dactylogyridea
- Family: Ancyrocephalidae
- Genus: Lethrinitrema; Lim & Justine, 2011

Species
- See text

Genus of flatworms

Lethrinitrema is a genus of monogeneans belonging to the family Ancyrocephalidae. The genus was created by Susan Lim and Jean-Lou Justine in 2011 for parasites of lethrinid fish from New Caledonia. All members of the genus are parasitic on the gills of fish.

== Species ==
The following species are considered valid according to WorRMS:

- Lethrinitrema austrosinense (Li & Chen, 2005) Sun, Li & Yang, 2014
- Lethrinitrema chrysostomi (Young, 1968) Lim & Justine, 2011
- Lethrinitrema dossenus Lim & Justine, 2011
- Lethrinitrema fleti (Young, 1968) Lim & Justine, 2011
- Lethrinitrema gibbus Lim & Justine, 2011
- Lethrinitrema grossecurvitubum (Li & Chen, 2005) Sun, Li & Yang, 1914
- Lethrinitrema lethrini (Yamaguti, 1937) Lim & Justine, 2011
- Lethrinitrema nebulosum Sun, Li & Yang, 2014
- Lethrinitrema zhanjiangense Sun, Li & Yang, 2014
