= Kritskyia =

Scientific classification
- Kingdom: Animalia
- Phylum: Platyhelminthes
- Class: Monogenea
- Order: Dactylogyridea
- Family: Ancyrocephalidae
- Genus: Kritskyia; Kohn, 1990

Genus of flatworms

Kritskyia is a genus of monogeneans in the family Ancyrocephalidae.

Like other monogeneans, species of Kritskyia only have one host required to complete their life cycle. In contrast to most species of monogeneans which are parasitic on the gills or on the skin of fish, species of Kritskyia are parasitic in the urinary organs of fish.

The genus was created by Anna Kohn in 1990, and the definition of the genus was emended by Boeger, Tanaka and Pavanelli in 2001. The name of the genus honours the American parasitologist Delane C. Kritsky, "for his contribution to our knowledge of Brazilian Monogenea".

== Species ==
Species of Kritskyia include:

- Kritskyia moraveci Kohn, 1990, a parasite of the urinary bladder and ureters of the fish Rhamdia quelen (Quoy & Gaimard, 1824) (Pimelodidae, Siluriformes). The name of the species honours the Czech parasitologist František Moravec.
- Kritskyia annakohnae Boeger, Tanaka & Pavanelli, 2001, a parasite of the urinary bladder and ureters of the piranhas Serrasalmus marginatus Valenciennes, 1836 and Serrasalmus spilopleura Kner, 1858 (Serrasalmidae, Characiformes). The name of the species honours the Brazilian parasitologist Anna Kohn.
- Kritskyia boegeri Takemoto, Lizama & Pavanelli 2002, a parasite of the urinary bladder of Prochilodus lineatus (Prochilodontidae, Characiformes).
- Kritskyia salmini Cepeda, Ceccarelli & Luque, 2011 a parasite of the urinary bladder of Salminus brasiliensis (Characiformes).
