= Boris Bychowsky =

- Борис Евсеевич Быховский
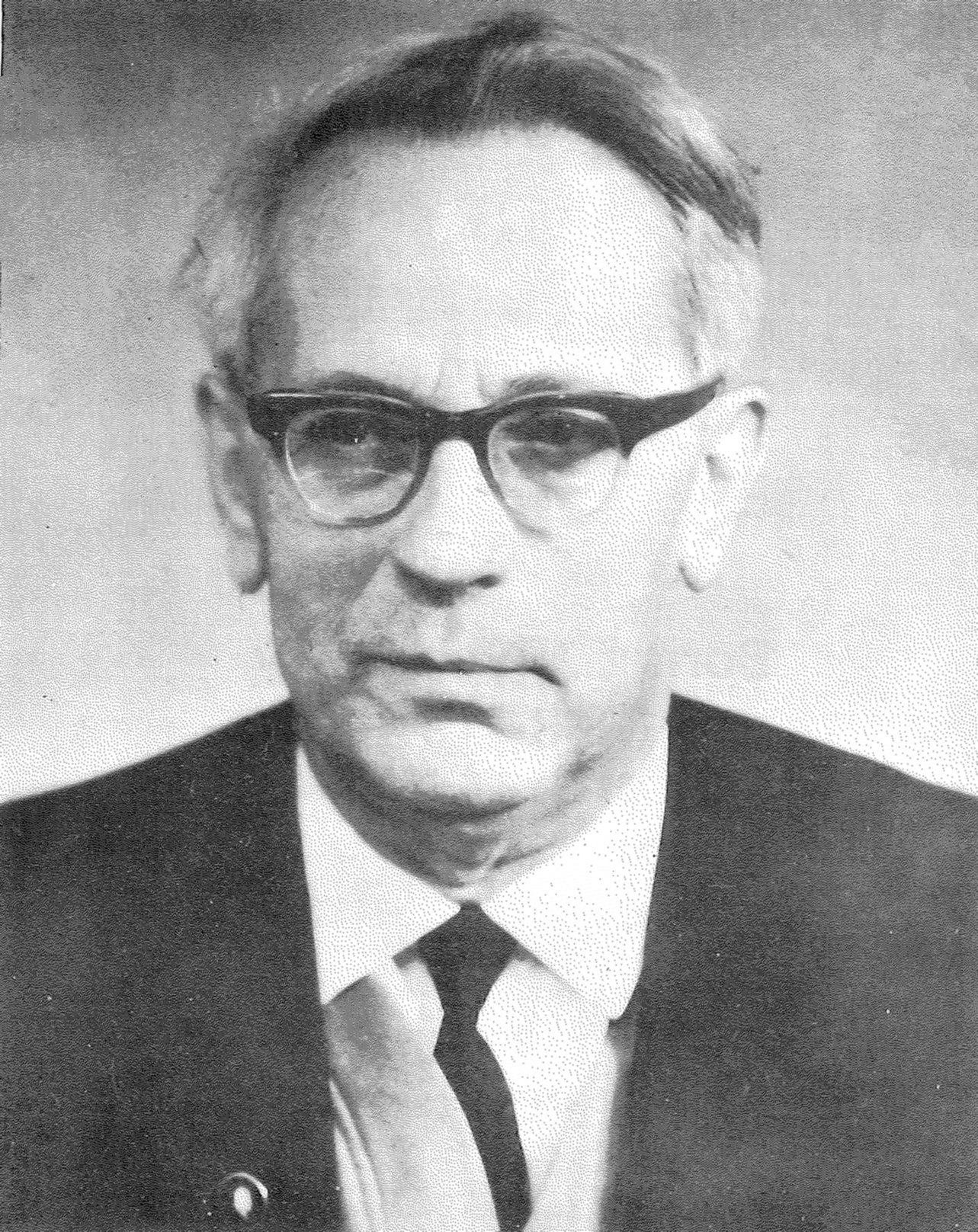
- Born: Boris Yevseyevich Bychowsky; 27 August 1908; Saint Petersburg, Russian Empire
- Died: 26 January 1974 (aged 65); Leningrad, RSFSR, Soviet Union
- Scientific career
- Fields: Parasitology
- Institutions: Institute of Zoology, Saint Petersburg, Russia

Boris Yevseyevich Bychowsky (Борис Евсеевич Быховский, 27 August 1908 – 26 January 1974) was a Soviet scientist and parasitologist, specialist of fish parasites, especially monogeneans. He was director of the Institute of Zoology of the Academy of Sciences of the Soviet Union in Leningrad (1962–1974). Bychowsky is the author of more than 100 scientific publications, mostly on systematics of monogeneans. His most famous work was his monography on monogeneans (1957), which was translated into English in 1961.

== Education ==
- 1930: graduated from the biology department of Physics and Mathematics Faculty of Leningrad State University
- 1935: PhD in biological sciences
- 1956: Habilitation in biological sciences

== Career ==
- 1929–1935: Laboratory of fish diseases Institute of Fisheries (Leningrad);
- 1935–1940: Zoological Institute of the Academy of Sciences of the Soviet Union
- 1940–1944: Deputy Chairman of the Presidium of the Tajikistan Branch of the Academy of Sciences of the Soviet Union
- 1942–1962: Deputy director of the Zoological Institute of the Academy of Sciences of the Soviet Union in Leningrad
- 1962–1974: Director of the Zoological Institute of the Academy of Sciences of the Soviet Union

== Honours ==
- 1963: Academician-Secretary of the Department of General Biology, Academy of Sciences of the Soviet Union
- 1964: Academy of Sciences of the Soviet Union
- Order of Lenin
- Order of the Red Banner of Labour

== Taxa named in his honour ==
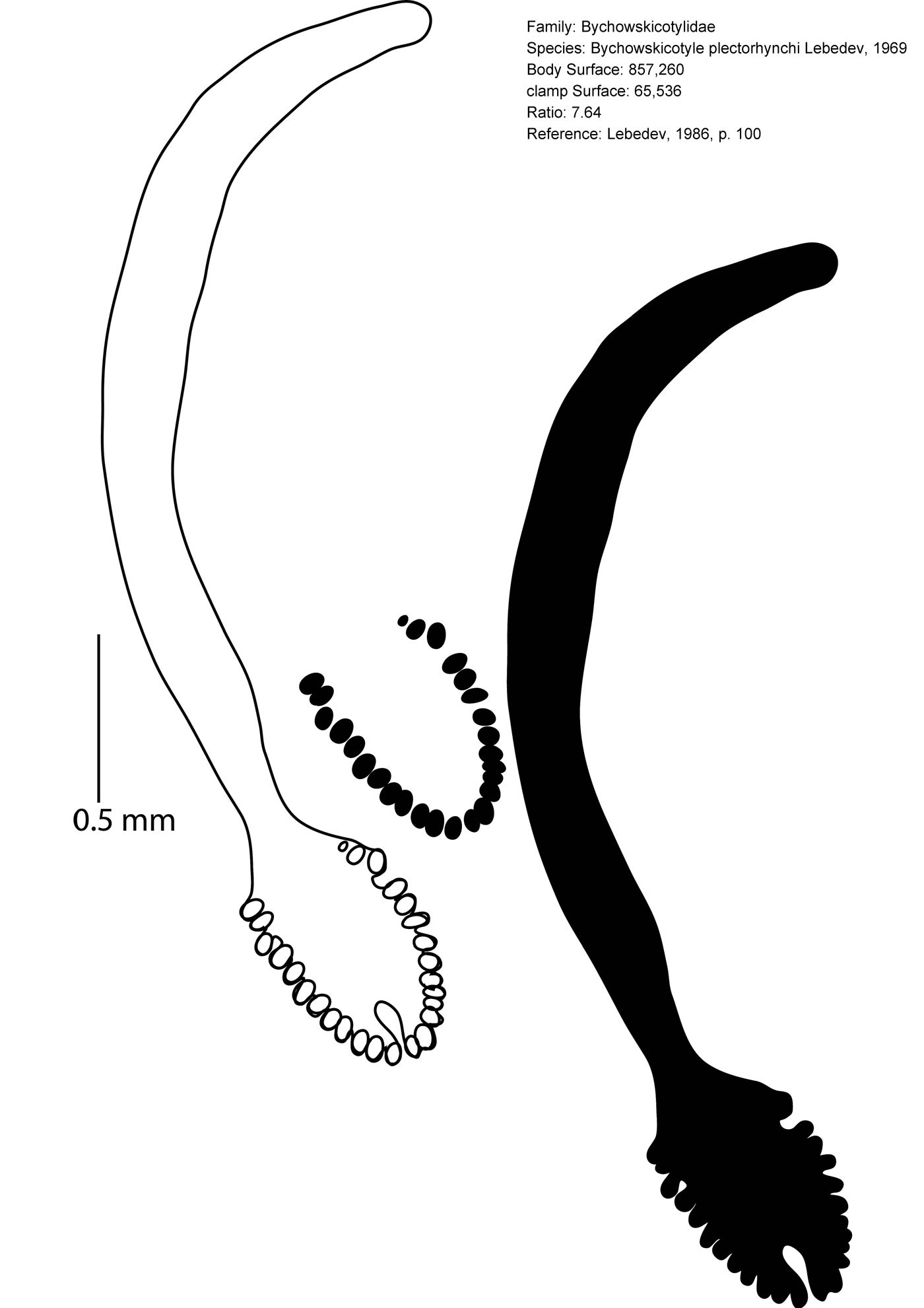
Bychowskicotyle plectorhynchi (Monogenea, Bychowskicotylidae)

The following taxa were created in his honour. Most are parasites of fish.

Family

- Bychowskicotylidae Lebedev, 1969

Genera

- Bychowskicotyle Lebedev, 1969
- Bychowskya Nagibina, 1968
- Bychowskyella Akhmerov, 1952, including Bychowskyella bychowskii Gusev, 1977 (both genus and species names dedicated to Bychowsky)
- Bychowskymonogenea Caballero & Bravo-Hollis, 1972

Species

Numerous species of monogeneans, including Absonifibula bychowskyi Lawler & Overstreet, 1976, Caniongiella bychowskyi Lebedev, 1976, Cribromazocraes bychowskyi Mamaev, 1981, Dicrumenia bychowskyi Mamaev, 1969, Dionchus bychowskyi Timofeeva, 1989, Euryhaliotrema bychowskyi (Obodnikova, 1976) Kritsky & Boeger, 2002, Gyrodactyloides bychowskii Albova, 1948, Gyrodactylus bychowskyi (Albova, 1948), Heterobothrium bychowskyi Ogawa, 1991, Mazocraeoides bychowskyi Caballero & Caballero, 1976, Mexicana bychowskyi Caballero & Bravo-Hollis, 1959, Mexicotrema bychowskyi Lamothe-Argumedo, 1969, Murraytrema bychowskyi Oliver, 1987, Murraytrematoides bychowskii (Nagibina, 1976) Oliver, 1987, Neohaliotrema bychowskii Zhukov, 1976, Neoheterocotyle bychowskyi (Timofeeva, 1981) Chisholm, 1994, Neotetraonchus bychowskyi Bravo-Hollis, 1968, Osphyobothrus bychowskyi Khoche & Chauhan, 1969, Pseudaxinoides bychowskyi Lebedev, 1977, Pseudodiplectanum bychowskii Nagibina, 1977, digeneans such as Genolopa bychowskii Zhukov, 1977, Hysterogonia bychowskii Korotaeva, 1972, and Phyllodistomum borisbychowskyi Caballero y Caballero, 1969, parasitic isopods such as Cymothoa bychowskyi Avdeev, 1979 and parasitic copepods such as Lepeophtheirus bychowskyi Gusev, 1951, and the Microsporidia Glugea bychowsky Gasimagomedov & Issi, 1970. In addition to all these fish parasites, the biting midge Culicoides bychowskyi Dzhafarov, 1964 (Ceratopogonidae, Diptera) was also named after Bychowsky.
