= Actinocleidus =

Scientific classification
- Domain: Eukaryota
- Kingdom: Animalia
- Phylum: Platyhelminthes
- Class: Monogenea
- Order: Dactylogyridea
- Family: Ancyrocephalidae
- Genus: Actinocleidus; Mueller, 1937

Species
- See text

Genus of flatworms

Actinocleidus is a genus of monogeneans belonging to the family Ancyrocephalidae. All members of the genus are parasitic on fish.

== Species ==
The following species are considered valid according to WoRMS:

- Actinocleidus articularis (Mizelle, 1936) Mueller, 1937
- Actinocleidus bennetti Allison & Rogers, 1970
- Actinocleidus bifidus Mizelle & Cronin, 1943
- Actinocleidus brevicirrus Mizelle & Jaskoski, 1942
- Actinocleidus cruciatus (Wedl, 1858)
- Actinocleidus fergusoni Mizelle, 1938
- Actinocleidus georgiensis Price, 1966
- Actinocleidus leiognathi Tripathi, 1959
- Actinocleidus oculatus (Mueller, 1934) Mueller, 1937
- Actinocleidus recurvatus Mizelle & Donahue, 1944

A number of other species are considered taxa inquirenda by WorMs.
