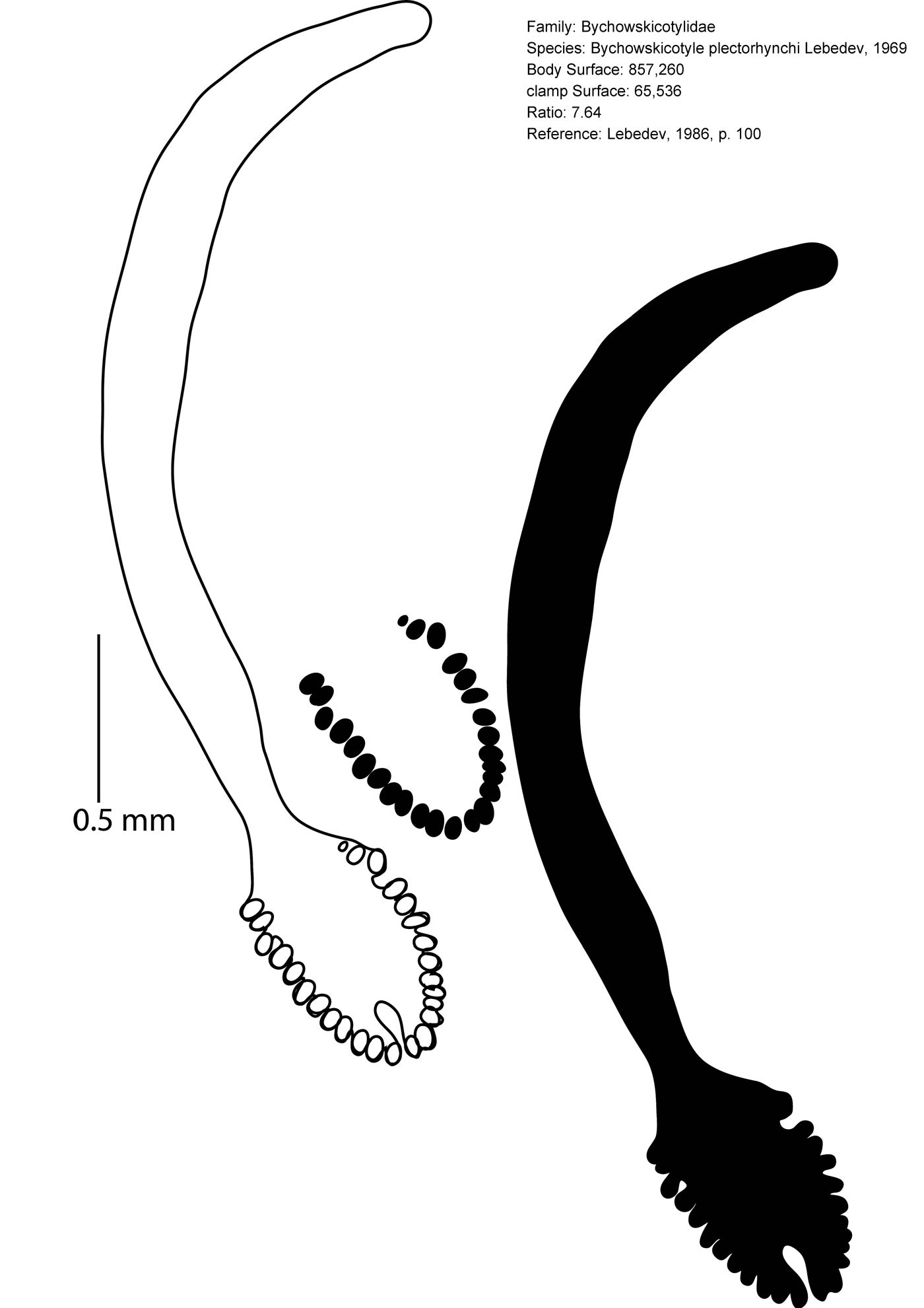
- Bychowskicotyle plectorhynchi

Scientific classification
- Kingdom: Animalia
- Phylum: Platyhelminthes
- Class: Monogenea
- Order: Mazocraeidea
- Family: Bychowskicotylidae; Lebedev, 1969

= Bychowskicotylidae =

Family of flatworms

Bychowskicotylidae is a family of monogeneans in the order Mazocraeidea. The name of the family, and of its type-genus Bychowskicotyle, was created to honour Boris Evseevitch Bychowsky, a Soviet scientist and parasitologist, specialist of monogeneans.

== Genera ==
- Bychowskicotyle Lebedev, 1969
- Gaterina Lebedev, 1969
- Tonkinopsis Lebedev, 1972
- Yamaguticotyla Price, 1959
