= Anchoradiscus =

Scientific classification
- Kingdom: Animalia
- Phylum: Platyhelminthes
- Class: Monogenea
- Order: Dactylogyridea
- Family: Ancyrocephalidae
- Genus: Anchoradiscus; Mizelle, 1941

Species
- See text.

Genus of flatworms

Anchoradiscus is a genus of monogeneans belonging to the family Ancyrocephalidae. All members of the genus are parasitic on North American centrachid fish.

== Species ==
A single species is considered valid according to WorRMS:

- Anchoradiscus triangularis (Summers, 1937) Mizelle, 1941
