= Scutogyrus =

Scientific classification
- Kingdom: Animalia
- Phylum: Platyhelminthes
- Class: Monogenea
- Order: Dactylogyridea
- Family: Ancyrocephalidae
- Genus: Scutogyrus; Pariselle & Euzet, 1995

Genus of flatworms

Scutogyrus is a genus of flatworms belonging to the family Ancyrocephalidae.

The species of this genus are found in Central America.

== Species ==
List based on GBIF

- Scutogyrus bailloni Pariselle & Euzet, 1995
- Scutogyrus chikhii Pariselle & Euzet, 1995
- Scutogyrus ecoutini Pariselle & Euzet, 1995
- Scutogyrus gravivaginus (Paperna & Thurston, 1969) Pariselle & Euzet, 1995
- Scutogyrus longicornis (Paperna & Thurston, 1969) Pariselle & Euzet, 1995
- Scutogyrus minus (Dossou, 1982) Pariselle & Euzet, 1995
- Scutogyrus vanhovei Pariselle, Bitja Nyom & Bilong Bilong, 2013

== Transcriptome ==
The transcriptome of Scutogyrus longicornis has been studied in 2022, and G-Protein-Coupled-Receptors (GPCRs) were described in detail in this species, together with those of another monogenean, the diplectanid Rhabdosynochus viridisi. These were the first two transcriptomes released for monogeneans of the subclass Monopisthocotylea.
