= Anchoradiscoides =

Scientific classification
- Kingdom: Animalia
- Phylum: Platyhelminthes
- Class: Monogenea
- Order: Dactylogyridea
- Family: Ancyrocephalidae
- Genus: Anchoradiscoides; Rogers, 1967

Species
- See text.

Genus of flatworms

Anchoradiscoides is a genus of monogeneans belonging to the family Ancyrocephalidae. All members of the genus are parasitic on North American centrachid fish.

== Species ==
A single species is accepted according to the World Register of Marine Species:

- Anchoradiscoides serpentinus Rogers, 1967
