= Aethycteron =

Scientific classification
- Kingdom: Animalia
- Phylum: Platyhelminthes
- Class: Monogenea
- Order: Dactylogyridea
- Family: Ancyrocephalidae
- Genus: Aethycteron; Suriano & Beverley-Burton, 1982

Species
- See text

Genus of flatworms

Aethycteron is a genus of monogeneans belonging to the family Ancyrocephalidae. All members of the genus are parasitic on fish. The generic name is derived from the Greek word aithycteros, meaning "darter", because members of the genus have been found infecting darters.

== Species ==
The following species are considered valid according to WorRMS:

- Aethycteron ammocryptus (Harrises & Vickery, 1970) Suriano & Beverly-Burton, 1982
- Aethycteron caerulei Suriano & Beverley-Burton, 1982
- Aethycteron chlorosomus (Harrises & Vickery, 1970) Suriano & Beverly-Burton, 1982
- Aethycteron lottensis (Harrises & Vickery, 1970) Suriano & Beverly-Burton, 1982
- Aethycteron malleus (Mueller, 1938) Suriano & Beverly-Burton, 1982
- Aethycteron micropercae Suriano & Beverly-Burton, 1982
- Aethycteron moorei (Mizelle, 1940) Suriano & Beverley-Burton, 1982
- Aethycteron nigrei Suriano & Beverly-Burton, 1982
- Aethycteron nigrofasciatus (Harrises, 1962) Suriano & Beverly-Burton, 1982
- Aethycteron robisoni Cloutman & McAllister, 2017
- Aethycteron stigmaeus (Harrises & Vickery, 1970) Suriano & Beverly-Burton, 1982
