= Octouncuhaptor =

Scientific classification
- Kingdom: Animalia
- Phylum: Platyhelminthes
- Class: Monogenea
- Order: Dactylogyridea
- Family: Ancyrocephalidae
- Genus: Octouncuhaptor; Mendoza-Franco, Roche & Torchin, 2008

Species
- See text.

Genus of worms

Octouncuhaptor is a genus of monopisthocotylean monogeneans in the family Ancyrocephalidae.

== Etymology ==
The name of the genus is derived from the Latin words octo ("eight") and uncu ("hook"), and reflects the eight pairs of hooks on the haptor of the type species.

== Species ==
According to the World Register of Marine Species, there is a single species in the genus:

- Octouncuhaptor eugerrei Mendoza Franco, Roche & Torchin, 2008

This species is a parasite of the fish Eugerres brasilianus (Gerreidae) from Gatun Lake, Panama Canal Watershed. It has also been mentioned from the fish Eugerres plumieri in Mexico.
