= Mexicana (flatworm) =

Scientific classification
- Kingdom: Animalia
- Phylum: Platyhelminthes
- Class: Monogenea
- Order: Dactylogyridea
- Family: Ancyrocephalidae
- Genus: Mexicana; Caballero & Bravo-Hollis, 1959

Species
- See text.

Genus of flatworms

Mexicana is a genus of monogeneans belonging to the family Ancyrocephalidae. All members of the genus are parasitic on fish.

== Species ==
The following species are considered valid according to WorRMS:

- Mexicana anisotremum Cezar, Paschoal & Luque, 2012
- Mexicana atlantica Luque, Amato & Takemoto, 1992
- Mexicana bychowskyi Caballero & Bravo-Hollis, 1959
- Mexicana iannaconi Chero, Cruces, Sáez & Alvariño, 2014
- Mexicana littoralis Caballero & Bravo-Hollis, 1959

For the distribution of Mexicana bychowskyi, see Mendoza-Garfias et al. (2017).
