= Systematic Parasitology =

- Discipline: Parasitology, taxonomy, systematics
- Language: English
- Edited by: Aneta Kostadinova

Publication details
- History: 1979–present
- Publisher: Springer Science+Business Media
- Frequency: Monthly
- Impact factor: 1.316 (2015)

Standard abbreviations
- ISO 4: Syst. Parasitol.

Indexing
- CODEN: SYPAD4
- ISSN: 0165-5752 (print); 1573-5192 (web)
- LCCN: 80649426
- OCLC no.: 41978964

Links
- Journal homepage; Online archives

Systematic Parasitology is a monthly peer-reviewed medical journal covering all aspects of the taxonomy and systematics of parasites. It was established in 1979 and is published by Springer Science+Business Media. The editor-in-chief is Aneta Kostadinova (Academy of Sciences of the Czech Republic).

== Abstracting and indexing ==
The journal is abstracted and indexed in:

- Science Citation Index
- Index Medicus/MEDLINE/PubMed
- Scopus
- Embase
- Biological Abstracts
- BIOSIS Previews
- Current Contents/Agriculture, Biology & Environmental Sciences
- Elsevier Biobase
- EMBiology
- Global Health
- Referativny Zhurnal
- The Zoological Record

According to the Journal Citation Reports, the journal has a 2013 impact factor of 1.035.
