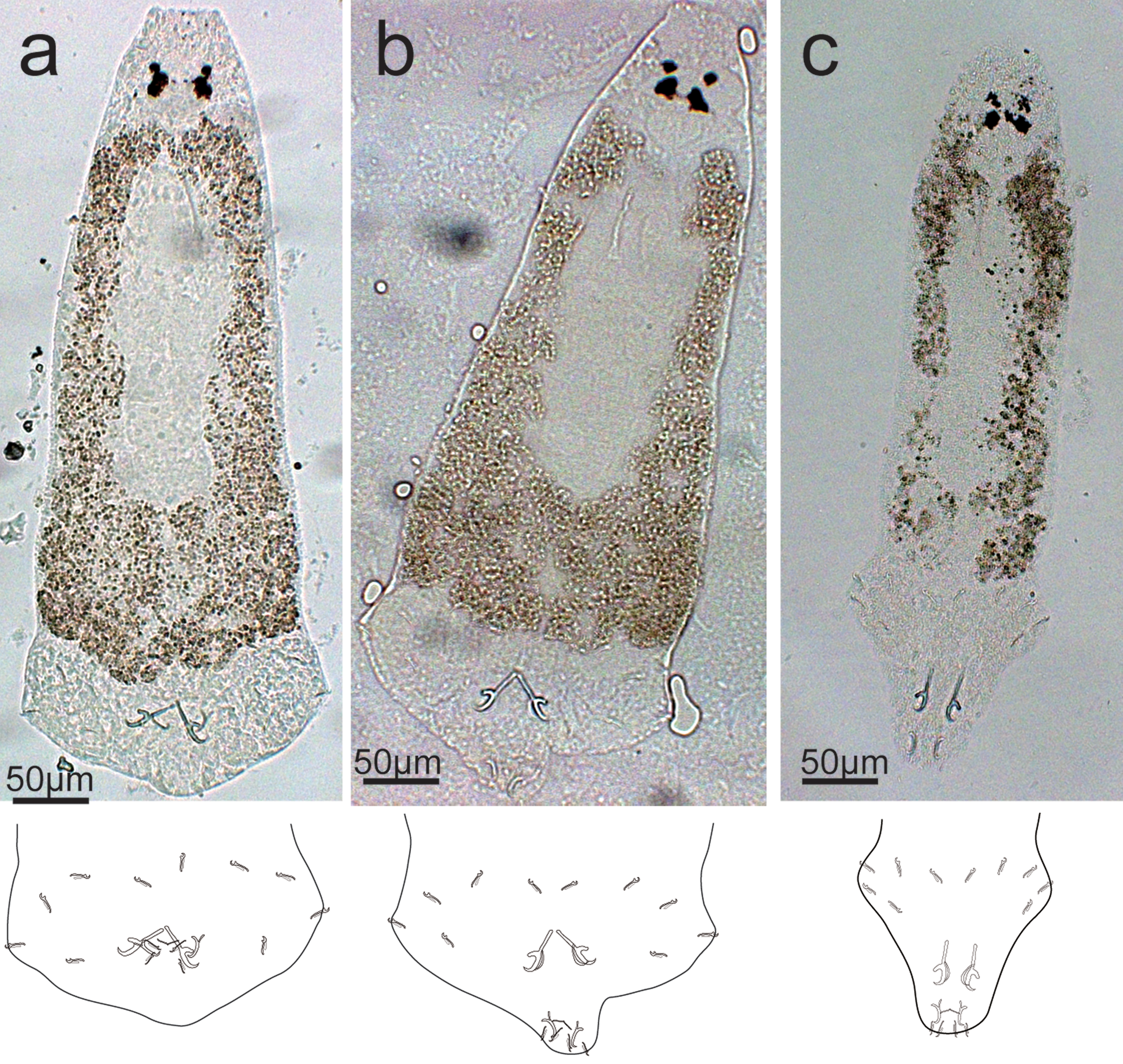
- Enterogyrus coronatus

Scientific classification
- Kingdom: Animalia
- Phylum: Platyhelminthes
- Class: Monogenea
- Order: Dactylogyridea
- Family: Ancyrocephalidae
- Genus: Enterogyrus; Paperna, 1963

Species
- See text

= Enterogyrus =

Genus of flatworms

Enterogyrus is a genus of monogeneans belonging to the family Ancyrocephalidae.

All members of the genus are parasitic on fish, but, in contrast to most ancyrocephalid which are parasites on the gills, species of Enterogyrus are parasite in the digestive system.

== Species ==
The following species are considered valid according to WorRMS:

- Enterogyrus amieti Bilong Bilong, Euzet & Birgi, 1996
- Enterogyrus barombiensis Bilong Bilong, Birgi & Euzet, 1991
- Enterogyrus cichlidarum Paperna, 1963
- Enterogyrus coronatus Pariselle, Lambert & Euzet, 1991
- Enterogyrus crassus Bilong Bilong, Euzet & Birgi, 1996
- Enterogyrus foratus Pariselle, Lambert & Euzet, 1991
- Enterogyrus malmbergi Bilong Bilong, 1988
- Enterogyrus melenensis Bilong Bilong, Birgi & Lambert, 1989

== Gallery ==
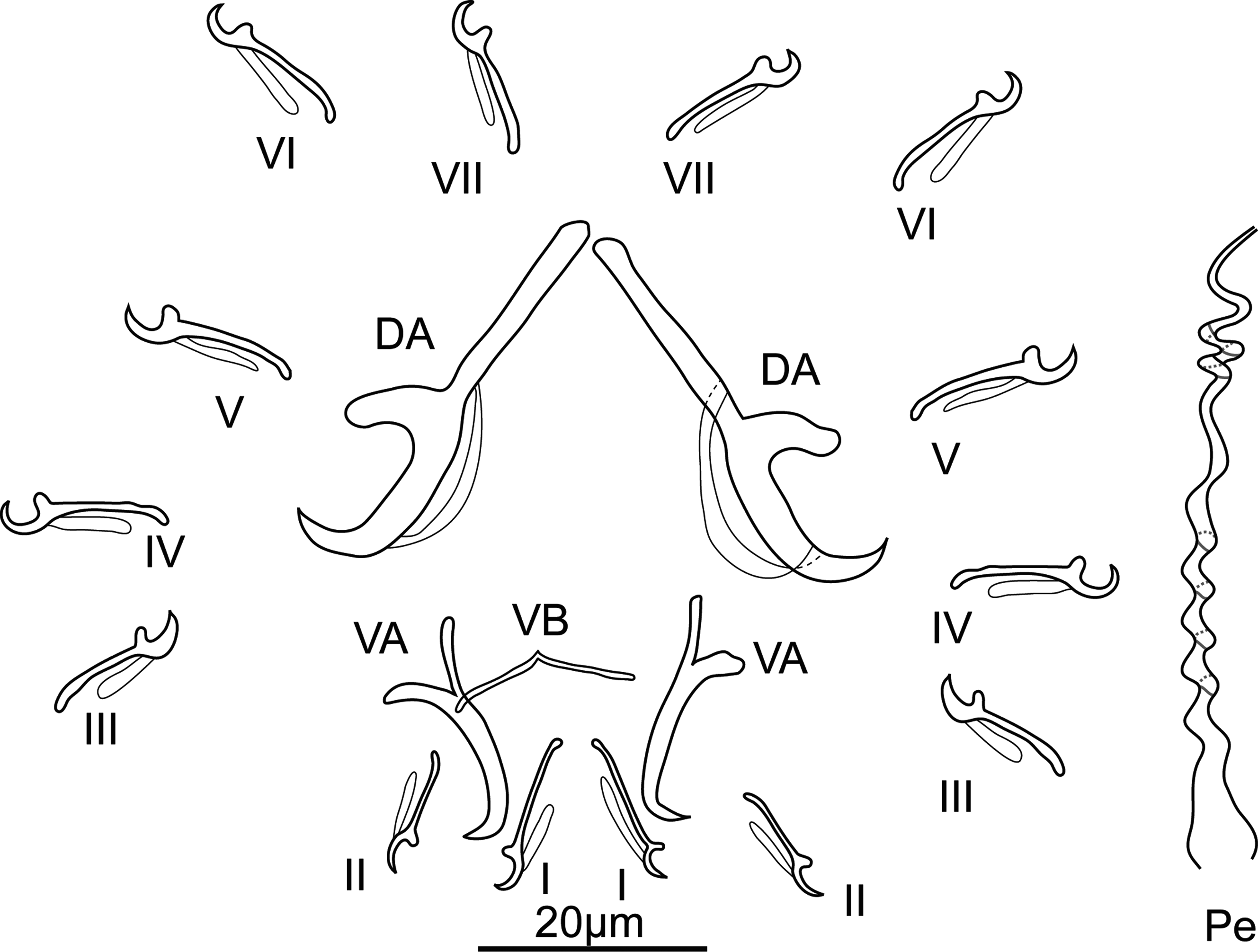
Enterogyrus coronatus, sclerotised parts

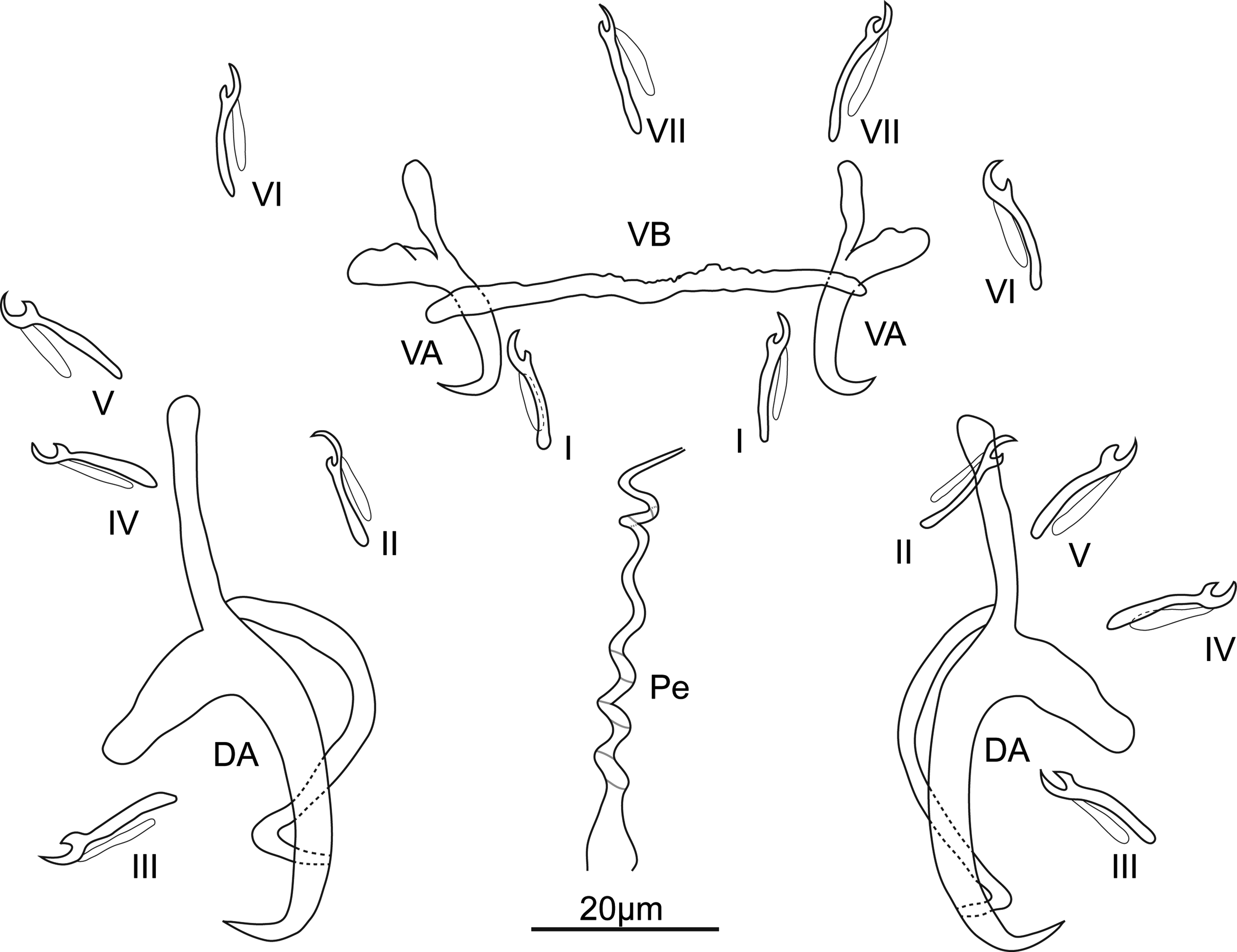
Enterogyrus malmbergi, sclerotised parts

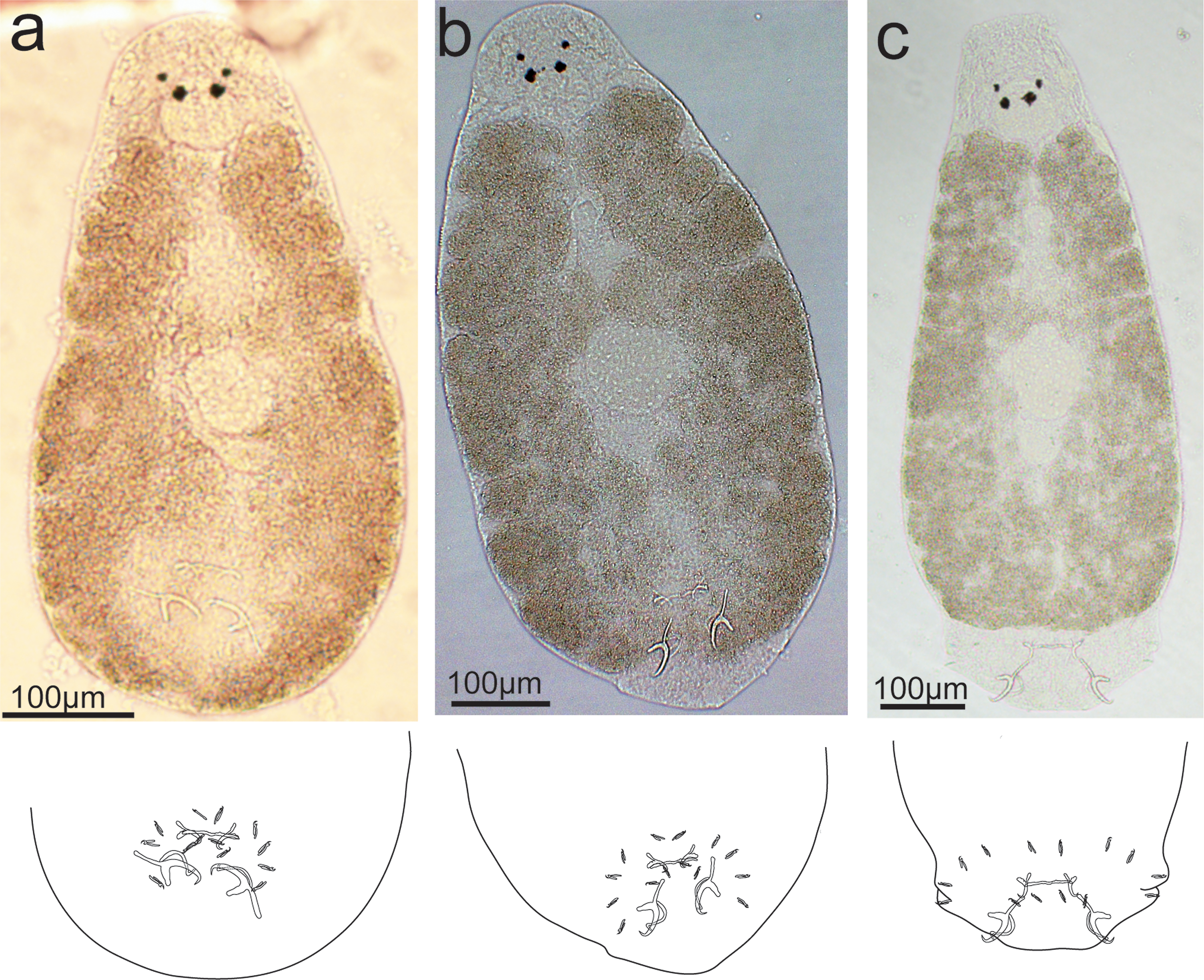
Enterogyrus malmbergi, body

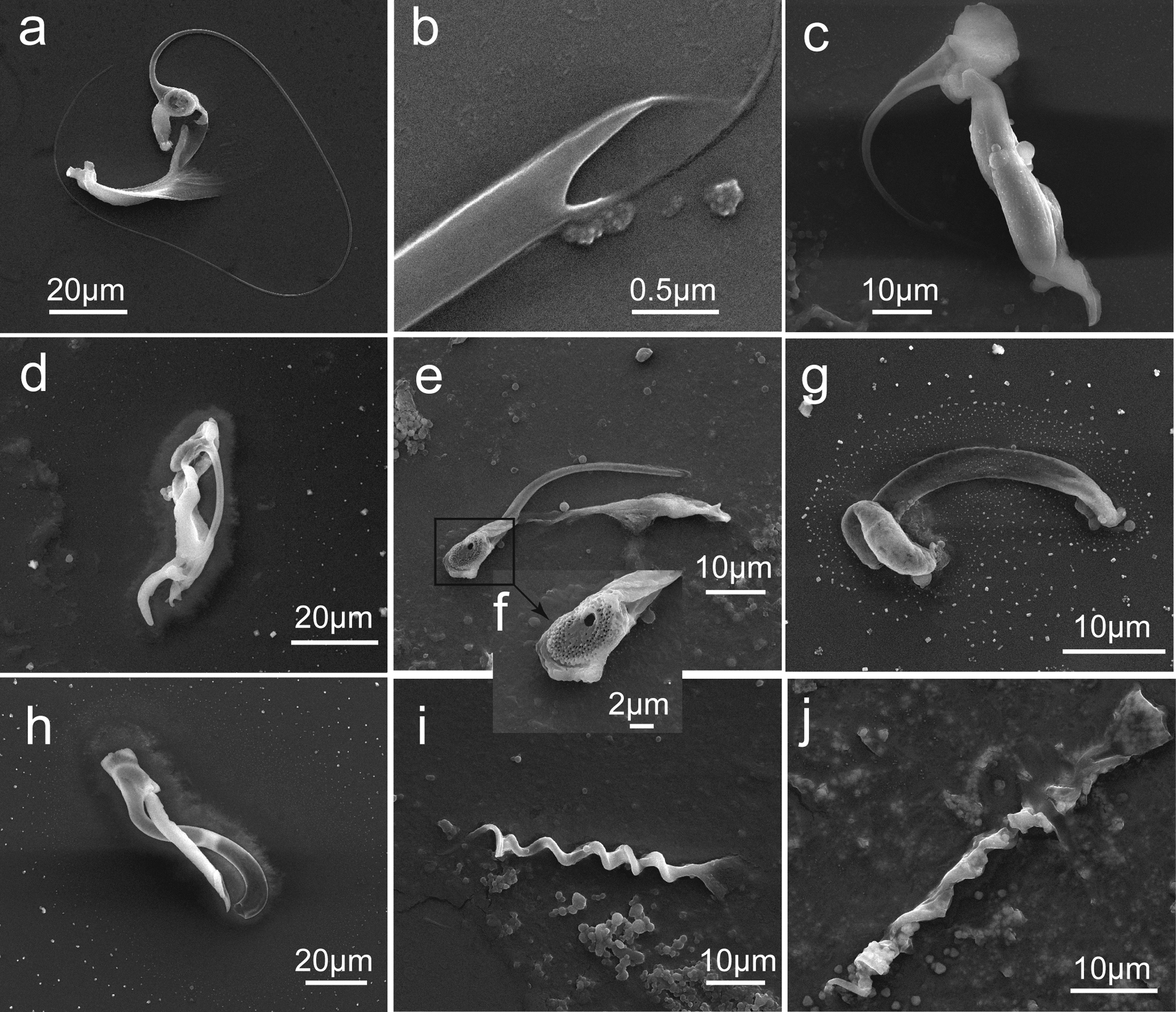
Scanning electron microscopy of various species
