= Susan Lim (parasitologist) =

Malaysian parasitologist

Susan Lim Lee Hong
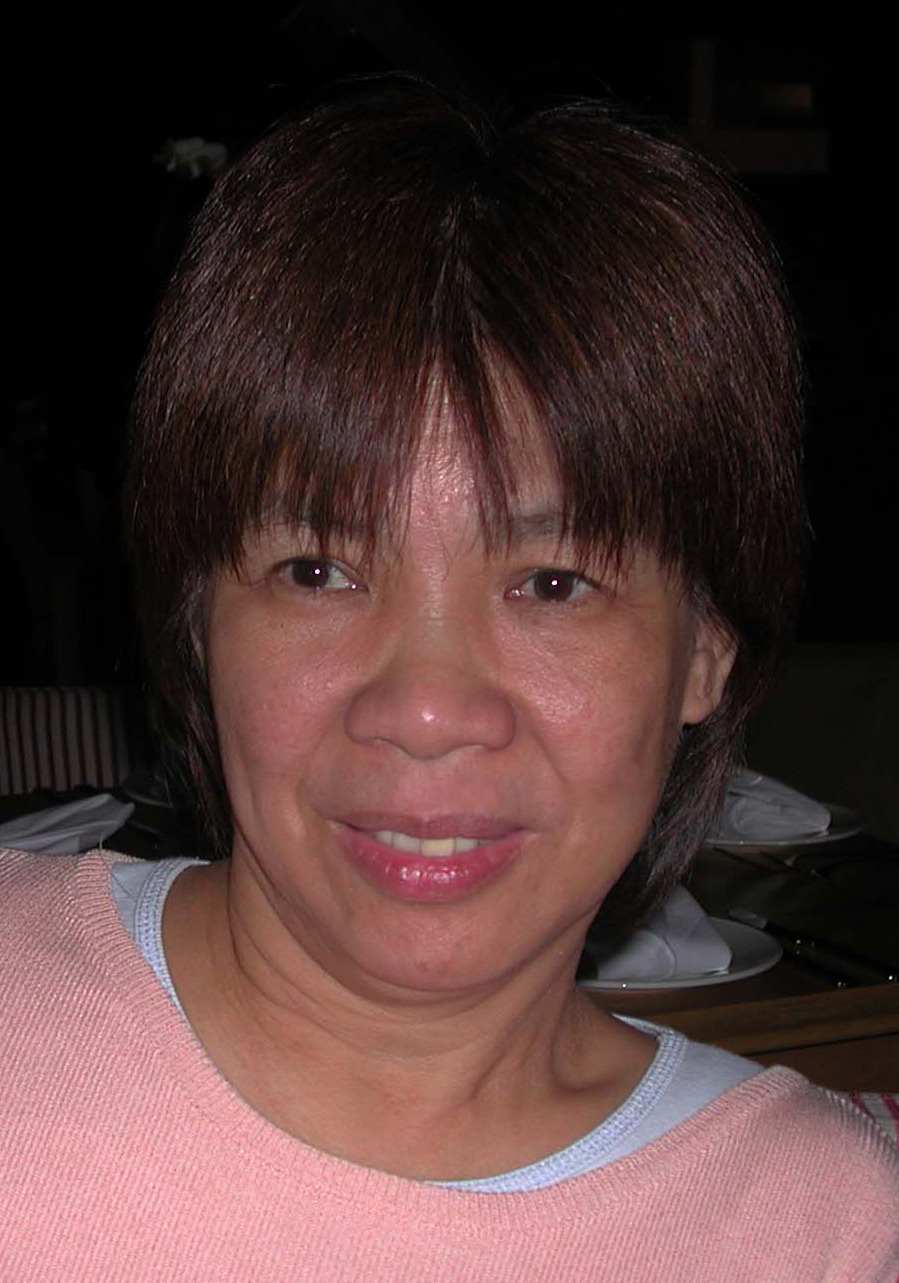
- Susan Lim in 2003
- Born: February 14, 1952; Seremban, Malaysia
- Died: August 2, 2014 (aged 62); Petaling Jaya, Malaysia
- Education: University of Malaya
- Scientific career
- Fields: Parasitology
- Workplaces: University of Malaya

Lee Hong Susan Lim (February 14, 1952 – August 2, 2014), more commonly known as Susan Lim, was a Malaysian parasitologist who specialised on the Monogenea, a class of parasitic flatworms which are important ectoparasites of fishes. She was the first and only Malaysian commissioner elected to the International Commission on Zoological Nomenclature. Her research was mainly in the fields of taxonomy and faunistics, although in later years, she became involved in a wide range of parasitological disciplines.

She has been considered the leading monogenean specialist in South-East Asia. By describing more than 100 new species and reassigning more than 100 others, she became the sixth most productive monogenean worker (and foremost female worker) of all time. She is also noted for describing an entirely new attachment mechanism in the form of net-like structures formed by secretions from the haptor of some of her worms.

Susan Lim died from cancer in Petaling Jaya, Selangor, Malaysia, on August 2, 2014, after a long illness.

== Education and career ==
Susan Lim was born at Seremban in the State of Negeri Sembilan, Malaysia, on February 14, 1952. She received her early education in the Convent of the Holy Infant Jesus, Seremban, and completed her 6th Form studies at St Pauls Institution, Seremban. In 1971 she entered the University of Malaya in Kuala Lumpur to read zoology. She remained at the same university for her MSc and PhD degrees, funding her studies as a university tutor. Her PhD, under the supervision of Prof. Jose I. Furtado, was on monogenean parasites of freshwater fishes and was completed in 1987. In 1989, she was awarded a lectureship in the same department and in 2003 was promoted to a full professor in the Institute of Biological Sciences. Susan Lim had numerous postgraduate students and strong international collaborations with specialists in her field.

== Awards and honours ==
- Full Professorship, University of Malaya, 2003
- Commissioner of the International Commission on Zoological Nomenclature, 2006–2014 (the only Malaysian ever elected)
- Life-membership of the Malaysian Society of Parasitology & Tropical Medicine, 2009.

== Personal life ==
Susan Lim married George Liew, a botanist, in 1979 and had two children.

== Eponymous taxa ==
The two monogenean genera Susanlimae Boeger, Pariselle & Patella, 2015 and Susanlimocotyle Soares, Domingues & Adriano, 2021 were named by their respective authors to "acknowledge the fact that Dr. Lim was greatly responsible for most of our knowledge of the diversity of Monogenea from Asian Siluriformes."

The following species of monogeneans were named in her honour:

- Calydiscoides limae Justine & Brena, 2009
- Cornudiscoides susanae Agrawal & Vishwakarma, 1996
- Dactylogyrus limae Timofeeva, Gerasev & Gibson, 1996
- Dactylogyrus limleehongae Gusev, 1985
- Haliotrema susanae Soo, 2019

== See also ==
- Timeline of women in science
