= Delane C. Kritsky =

American parasitologist

- Citizenship: American
- Education: University of Illinois Urbana-Champaign
- Known for: parasitology, Monogenea
- Scientific career
- Fields: Parasitology
- Workplaces: Idaho State University

Delane C. Kritsky is an American parasitologist who specialised on the Monogenea, a class of parasitic flatworms which are important ectoparasites of fishes. His research was mainly in the fields of taxonomy, faunistics, and phylogeny of the Monogenea.

He is a prolific author in the field of systematics of Monogenea, with hundreds of species described, and is known within his field for his co-authorship of a major revision of the Monogenea in 1993.

== Career ==
Delane C. Kritsky earned his PhD degree in zoology from the University of Illinois Urbana-Champaign in 1971. He had his whole career in Idaho State University where he began in 1974 as an assistant professor, and became a full professor in 1983. He has been an administrator for much of his career: from 1979 to 1989 he was the chair of the Department of Allied Health Professions, was acting dean in 1985–1986, and associate dean from 1989 until his retirement. He is still (2018) Emeritus Professor in Idaho State University. He is a member of the editorial board of several journals of parasitology, including Zoologia and Systematic Parasitology.

== Eponymous taxa ==
The digenean genus Kritsky Orélis-Ribeiro and Bullard, 2016 and the monogenean genus Kritskyia Kohn, 1990 were named in his honour. Several species of monogeneans were named in his honour, such as Bravohollisia kritskyi Lim, 1995, Dactylogyrus kritskyi Mizelle & McDougal 1970, Diaphorocleidus kritskyi Justo, Silva, Ottoni, Mendonça, Nigris & Cohen, 2025, Protogyrodactylus kritskyi Boeger, Diamanka, Pariselle & Patella 2012, Pseudorhabdosynochus kritskyi Dyer, Williams & Bunkley-Williams, 1995, Sciadicleithrum kritskyi Bellay, Takemoto, Yamada & Pavanelli, 2009, Tereancistrum kritskyi Yamada, Sousa, Diniz & Yamada, 2025, and Haliotrema kritskyi Vala, Maillard & Overstreet, 1982 and a species of digeneans, Lissorchis kritskyi Barnhart & Powell,1979.
