= Lepidotrema =

Scientific classification
- Kingdom: Animalia
- Phylum: Platyhelminthes
- Class: Monogenea
- Order: Dactylogyridea
- Family: Diplectanidae
- Genus: Lepidotrema; Johnston & Tiegs, 1922

Species
- See text

Genus of flatworms

Lepidotrema is a genus of monopisthocotylean monogeneans, belonging to the family Diplectanidae. All its species are parasites on fish. The type-species is Lepidotrema therapon Johnston & Tiegs, 1922.

The genus Squamodiscus Yamaguti, 1934 is considered a junior synonym of Lepidotrema.

== Species ==
According to the World Register of Marine Species, species include:

- Lepidotrema angustum (Johnston & Tiegs, 1922)
- Lepidotrema bidyana Murray, 1931
- Lepidotrema fuliginosum Johnston & Tiegs, 1922
- Lepidotrema kuwaitense Kritsky, Jimenez-Ruiz & Sey, 2000
- Lepidotrema longipenis (Yamaguti, 1934) Kritsky, Jiménez-Ruiz & Sey, 2000
- Lepidotrema simplex (Johnston & Tiegs, 1922)
- Lepidotrema tenue Johnston & Tiegs, 1922
- Lepidotrema therapon Johnston & Tiegs, 1922
