= Lobotrema =

Scientific classification
- Kingdom: Animalia
- Phylum: Platyhelminthes
- Class: Monogenea
- Order: Dactylogyridea
- Family: Diplectanidae
- Genus: Lobotrema; Tripathi, 1959

Species
- See text

Genus of worms

Lobotrema is a genus of monopisthocotylean monogeneans, belonging to the family Diplectanidae. All species within this genus are parasites of fish. The type species is Lobotrema madrasi Tripathi, 1959.

The two genera- Allomurraytrema Yamaguti, 1963, and Pseudomurraytrema Yamaguti, 1958, are considered synonyms of Lobotrema.

== Species ==
According to the World Register of Marine Species, species include:

- Lobotrema argyrosomi (Bychowsky & Nagibina, 1977) Oliver, 1987
- Lobotrema caballeroi Gupta & Sharma, 1984
- Lobotrema kumari Oliver, 1987
- Lobotrema madrasi Tripathi, 1959
- Lobotrema sciaenae (Bychowsky & Nagibina, 1977) Oliver, 1987
- Lobotrema spari (Yamaguti, 1958) Oliver, 1987
- Lobotrema youngi Gupta & Sharma, 1984
