= Oliveriplectanum =

Scientific classification
- Kingdom: Animalia
- Phylum: Platyhelminthes
- Class: Monogenea
- Order: Dactylogyridea
- Family: Diplectanidae
- Genus: Oliveriplectanum; Domingues & Boeger, 2008

Species
- See text

Genus of worms

Oliveriplectanum is a genus of monopisthocotylean monogeneans belonging to the family Diplectanidae. All its species are parasites on marine perciform fishes (Lutjanidae, Priacanthidae).

== Etymology ==
The genus was named in honor of Guy Oliver, "in recognition of his valuable work on the Diplectanidae".

== Species ==
According to the World Register of Marine Species, there are only three species in the genus. All three have been described previously as members of Diplectanum by Satyu Yamaguti. All the species were found on fish collected off Hawaii.

- Oliveriplectanum curvivagina (Yamaguti, 1968) Domingues & Boeger, 2008
- Oliveriplectanum opakapaka (Yamaguti, 1968) Domingues & Boeger, 2008
- Oliveriplectanum priacanthi (Yamaguti, 1968) Domingues & Boeger, 2008
