= Gyrodactylus branchialis =

Scientific classification
- Kingdom: Animalia
- Phylum: Platyhelminthes
- Class: Monogenea
- Order: Gyrodactylidea
- Family: Gyrodactylidae
- Genus: Gyrodactylus
- Species: G. branchialis

Binomial name
- Gyrodactylus branchialis Huyse, Malmberg & Volckaert, 2004

Species of flatworm

Gyrodactylus branchialis is a species of monogenean ectoparasites. It was found in Pomatoschistus microps in European coastal waters.

== See also ==
- Gyrodactylus gondae
- Gyrodactylus flavescensis
- Gyrodactylus arcuatoides
