= Nasobranchitrema =

Scientific classification
- Kingdom: Animalia
- Phylum: Platyhelminthes
- Class: Monogenea
- Order: Dactylogyridea
- Family: Diplectanidae
- Genus: Nasobranchitrema; Yamaguti, 1965

Species
- See text

Genus of worms

Nasobranchitrema is a genus of monopisthocotylean monogeneans, belonging to the family Diplectanidae. The position of Nasobranchitrema within the family Diplectanidae is a matter of controversy. Oliver considered that the absence of squamodisc and adhesive plate in the haptor and the position of the ovary made the genus closer to the Ancyrocephalidae than to the Diplectanidae.

== Species ==
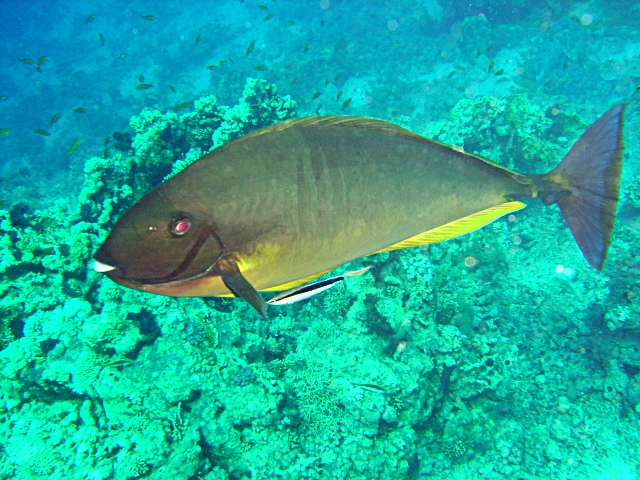
The unicorn fish Naso hexacanthus is the host of Nasobranchitrema pacificum

According to the World Register of Marine Species, there is a single species in the genus Nasobranchitrema:

- Nasobranchitrema pacificum Yamaguti, 1965

Nasobranchitrema pacificum is a parasite on the gills of unicorn fishes (family Acanthuridae), Naso hexacanthus (type host), Naso lituratus, and Naso brevirostris, all from off Hawaii.
