= Neodiplectanum =

Scientific classification
- Kingdom: Animalia
- Phylum: Platyhelminthes
- Class: Monogenea
- Order: Dactylogyridea
- Family: Diplectanidae
- Genus: Neodiplectanum; Mizelle & Blatz, 1941

Species
- See text

Genus of worms

Neodiplectanum is a genus of monopisthocotylean monogeneans, belonging to the family Diplectanidae. According to Mizelle & Blatz (1941), the genus Neodiplectanum "differs from Diplectanum Diesing, 1858, its closest relative, by the presence of two, instead of three, cuticular bars on the haptor". Oliver (1987) thought that the two genera were synonyms, but Neodiplectanum was resurrected later.

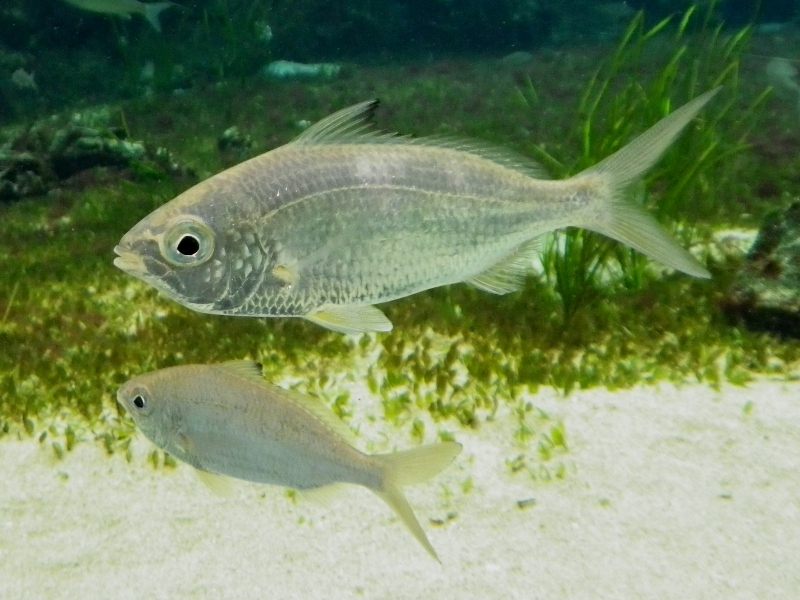
A gerrid, a member of the family of fish which harbours species of Neodiplectanum

Species of Neodiplectanum are parasitic on the gills of fish of the family Gerreidae.

== Species ==
According to the World Register of Marine Species, species in this genus include:

- Neodiplectanum gatunense (Mendoza Franco, Roche & Torchin, 2008) Domingues, Diamanka & Pariselle, 2011
- Neodiplectanum magnodiscatum (Fuentes Zambrano, 1997) Domingues, Diamanka & Pariselle, 2011
- Neodiplectanum mexicanum (Mendoza Franco, Roche & Torchin, 2008) Domingues, Diamanka & Pariselle, 2011
- Neodiplectanum wenningeri Mizelle & Blatz, 1941 (type species)
