= Protolamellodiscus =

Scientific classification
- Kingdom: Animalia
- Phylum: Platyhelminthes
- Class: Monogenea
- Order: Dactylogyridea
- Family: Diplectanidae
- Genus: Protolamellodiscus; Oliver, 1969

Species
- See text

Genus of worms

Protolamellodiscus is a genus of monopisthocotylean monogeneans in the family Diplectanidae. All species of Protolamellodiscus are parasites of marine perciform fishes of the families Lethrinidae, Nemipteridae, Serranidae and Sparidae.

== Species ==
According to the World Register of Marine Species, the following species are included in the genus:

- Protolamellodiscus convolutus (Yamaguti, 1953) Oliver, 1987
- Protolamellodiscus raibauti Oliver & Radujkovic, 1987
- Protolamellodiscus senilobatus Kritsky, Jiménez-Ruiz & Sey, 2000
- Protolamellodiscus serranelli (Euzet & Oliver, 1965) Oliver, 1969 (Type-species)
