= Murraytrematoides =

Scientific classification
- Kingdom: Animalia
- Phylum: Platyhelminthes
- Class: Monogenea
- Order: Dactylogyridea
- Family: Diplectanidae
- Genus: Murraytrematoides; Yamaguti, 1958

Species
- See text

Genus of flatworms

Murraytrematoides is a genus of monopisthocotylean monogeneans in the family Diplectanidae.

Species of this genus are parasite on Perciformes and Anguilliformes marine fish. The genus Geneticoenteron Yamaguti, 1958 was considered a synonym of Murraytrematoides by Oliver.

== Species ==
According to the World Register of Marine Species, species include:

- Murraytrematoides bychowskii (Nagibina, 1976) Oliver, 1987
- Murraytrematoides ditrematis Yamaguti, 1958 (Type-species)
- Murraytrematoides kuhliae Yamaguti, 1968
- Murraytrematoides lateolabracis (Yamaguti, 1958) Oliver, 1987
