= Gyrodactylus gondae =

Scientific classification
- Kingdom: Animalia
- Phylum: Platyhelminthes
- Class: Monogenea
- Order: Gyrodactylidea
- Family: Gyrodactylidae
- Genus: Gyrodactylus
- Species: G. gondae

Binomial name
- Gyrodactylus gondae Huyse, Malmberg & Volckaert, 2004

Species of flatworm

Gyrodactylus gondae is a species of monogenean ectoparasites. It was found in Pomatoschistus minutus and Pomatoschistus lozanoi in European coastal waters.

== Etymology ==
The species was named in honor of Dr. Gonda Geets, who first detected the species.

== See also ==
- Gyrodactylus flavescensis
- Gyrodactylus arcuatoides
- Gyrodactylus branchialis
