= Gyrodactylus arcuatoides =

Scientific classification
- Kingdom: Animalia
- Phylum: Platyhelminthes
- Class: Monogenea
- Order: Gyrodactylidea
- Family: Gyrodactylidae
- Genus: Gyrodactylus
- Species: G. arcuatoides

Binomial name
- Gyrodactylus arcuatoides Huyse, Malmberg & Volckaert, 2004

Species of flatworm

Gyrodactylus arcuatoides is an ectoparasite. It was found on the sand goby (Pomatoschistus minutus) in European coastal waters.

== See also ==
- Gyrodactylus gondae
- Gyrodactylus flavescensis
- Gyrodactylus branchialis
