= Acleotrema =

Scientific classification
- Kingdom: Animalia
- Phylum: Platyhelminthes
- Class: Monogenea
- Order: Dactylogyridea
- Family: Diplectanidae
- Genus: Acleotrema; Johnston & Tiegs, 1922

Species
- See text

Genus of flatworms

Acleotrema is a genus of monopisthocotylean monogeneans in the family Diplectanidae. All its species are parasites on fish. The type-species is Acleotrema girellae Johnston & Tiegs, 1922.

Heteroplectanum Rakotofiringa, Oliver & Lambert, 1987 is considered a junior synonym of Acleotrema.

== Species ==
According to the World Register of Marine Species, species include:

- Acleotrema diplobulbus (Yamaguti, 1968) Domingues & Boeger, 2007
- Acleotrema flabelliforme (Lim, 2006)
- Acleotrema girellae Johnston & Tiegs, 1922
- Acleotrema lamothei Santos, Bianchi & Gibson, 2008
- Acleotrema nenue (Yamaguti, 1968) Dominques & Boeger, 2007
- Acleotrema nenuoides (Rakotofiringa, Oliver & Lambert, 1987)
- Acleotrema oliveri (León-Régagnon, Pérez-Ponce de León & Garcia Prieto, 1997) Domingues & Boeger 2007
- Acleotrema parastromatei (Rakotofiringa, Oliver & Lambert, 1987) Domingues & Boeger, 2007
- Acleotrema serrulopenis (Rakotofiringa, Oliver & Lambert, 1987)
- Acleotrema spiculare (Yamaguti, 1968)
- Acleotrema tamatavense (Rakotofiringa, Oliver & Lambert, 1987)
- Acleotrema yamagutii (Oliver, 1983)
