= Teraplectanum =

Scientific classification
- Domain: Eukaryota
- Kingdom: Animalia
- Phylum: Platyhelminthes
- Class: Monogenea
- Order: Dactylogyridea
- Family: Diplectanidae
- Genus: Teraplectanum; Lim, 2015

Species
- See text

Genus of worms

Teraplectanum is a genus of monopisthocotylean monogeneans, belonging to the family Diplectanidae. All species of the genus are parasitic on the gills of fish in the family Teraponidae.

Susan Lim (2015) described the genus on the basis of the arrangement of the copulatory apparatus and wrote: "in species of Teraplectanum, spermatozoa stored in the seminal vesicle and secretions stored in the prostatic reservoir are transferred into, and mixed to form semen within, a special sclerotized auxiliary piece".

== Etymology ==
The generic name is derived from Terapon, the genus of the type-host, and Diplectanum, the type genus of the family Diplectanidae.

== Species ==
According to the World Register of Marine Species, the following species are included in the genus:

- Teraplectanum angustitubus Lim, 2015
- Teraplectanum crassitubus Lim, 2015 (Type-species)
- Teraplectanum undulicirrosum (Zhang, Liu, Ding & Chen, 2000) Lim, 2015
