= Cylindrotaenia japonica =

Scientific classification
- Kingdom: Animalia
- Phylum: Platyhelminthes
- Class: Cestoda
- Order: Cyclophyllidea
- Family: Nematotaeniidae
- Genus: Cylindrotaenia
- Species: C. japonica

Binomial name
- Cylindrotaenia japonica (Yamaguti 1938) Jones, 1987

Synonyms
- Baerietta claviformis Yamaguti, 1954; Baerietta japonica Yamaguti, 1938

Species of tapeworm

Cylindrotaenia japonica is a tapeworm of frogs in Japan.
