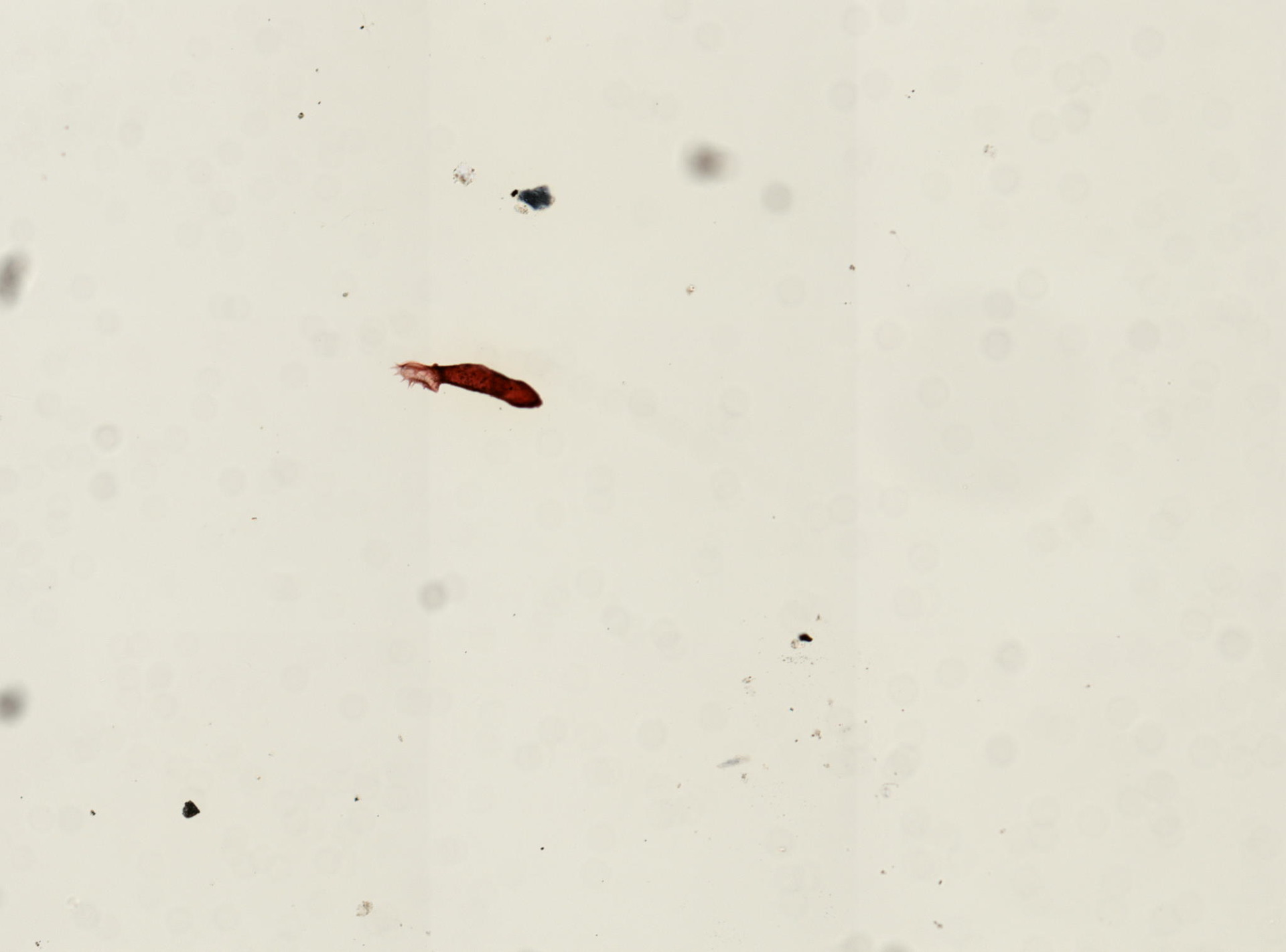

Scientific classification
- Kingdom: Animalia
- Phylum: Platyhelminthes
- Class: Monogenea
- Order: Gyrodactylidea
- Family: Gyrodactylidae
- Genus: Gyrodactylus
- Species: G. elegans

Binomial name
- Gyrodactylus elegans von Nordmann, 1832

= Gyrodactylus elegans =

Species of flatworm

Gyrodactylus elegans is a species of monogenean parasitic flatworms in the family Gyrodactylidae.

It is reported parasiting the golden shiner (Notemigonus crysoleucas) in the wild as well as the goldfish (Carassius auratus) in aquaria.
