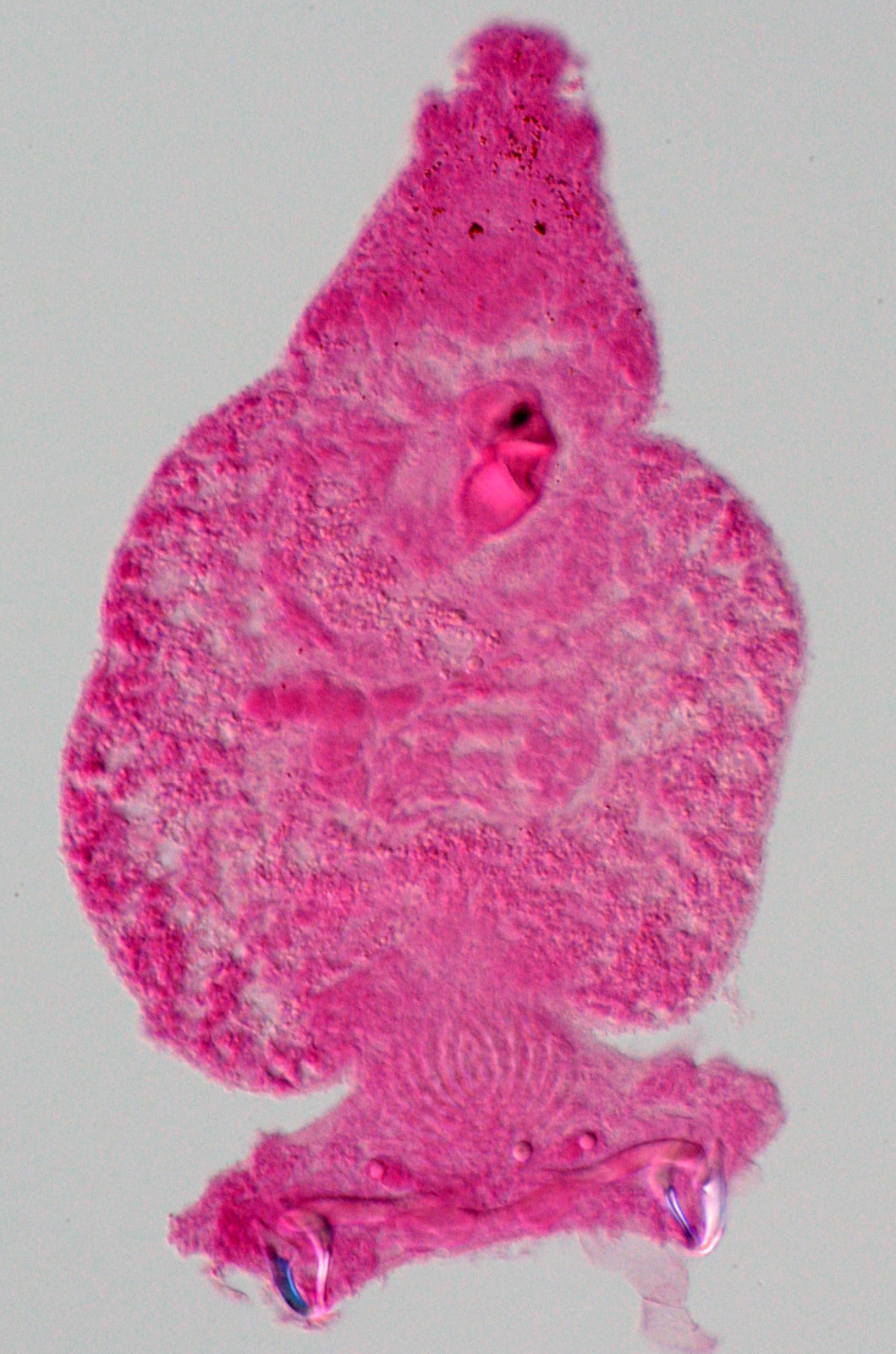
- Pseudorhabdosynochus morrhua

Scientific classification
- Kingdom: Animalia
- Phylum: Platyhelminthes
- Class: Monogenea
- Order: Dactylogyridea
- Family: Diplectanidae; Monticelli, 1903

= Diplectanidae =

Family of flatworms

The Diplectanidae are a family of monopisthocotylean monogeneans. They are all parasitic on the gills of fish (marine or freshwater). Diplectanids are small animals, generally around 1 mm in length. As parasites, they can be extremely numerous, up to several thousand on an individual fish.

== History ==
The family Diplectanidae was proposed by the Italian parasitologist Monticelli in 1903 (as subfamily Diplectaninae). The status of the family and its components was later examined by various authors, including Johnston & Tiegs (1922), Price (1937), Bychowsky (1957), Yamaguti (1963), and Oliver (1987).

== Morphology ==
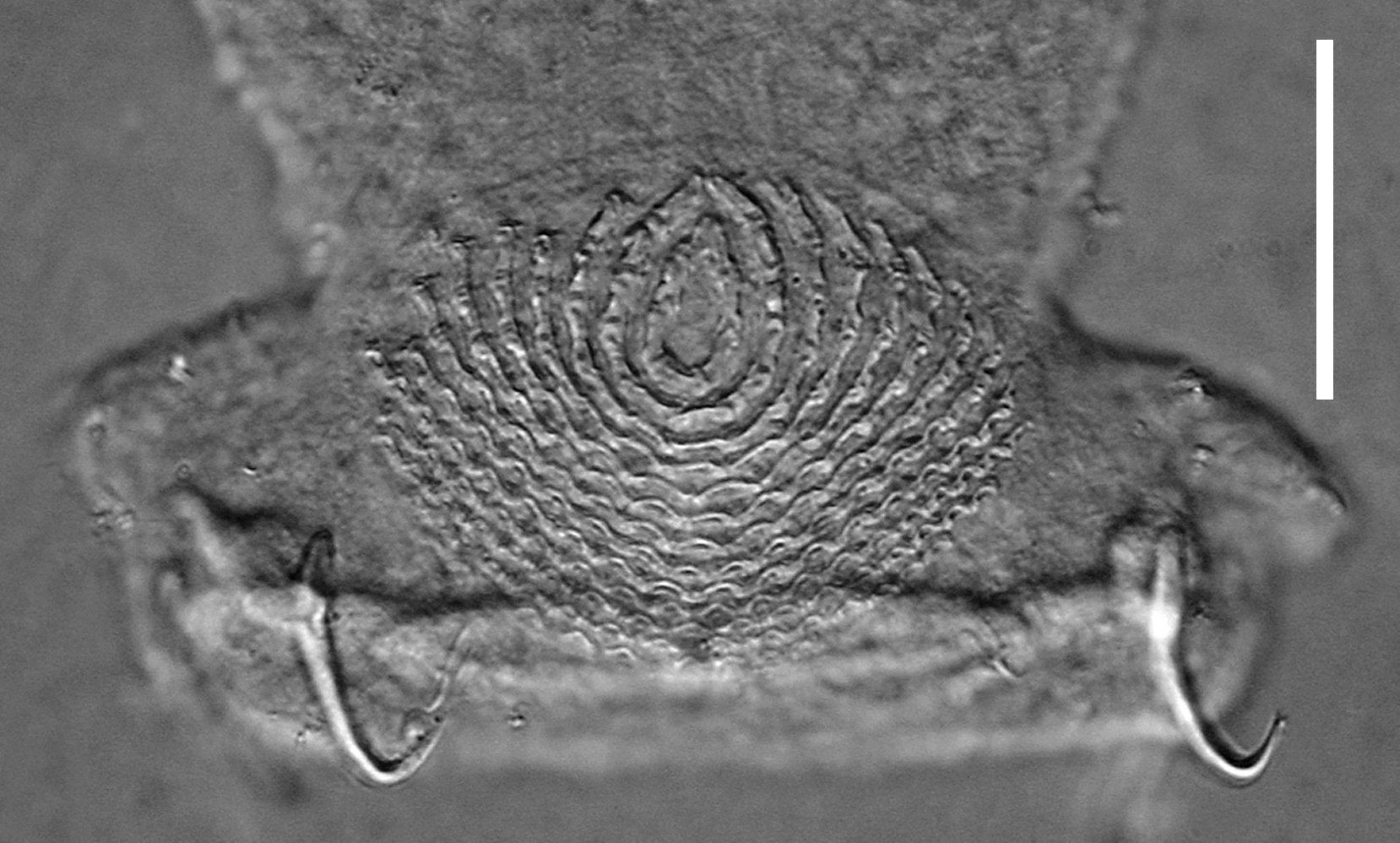
Haptor of Pseudorhabdosynochus jeanloui showing a squamodisc, hooks and bars - scale: 40 μm

Diplectanids are diagnosed by the combination of these three characters:

- Presence of accessory adhesive organs on dorsal and ventral part of the haptor, called squamodiscs when they are made up of rodlets and lamellodiscs when they include lamellae
- In the haptor, three transversal bars (one ventral, two lateral (dorsal), connected to two pairs of hooks (one pair dorsal, one pair ventral)
- A germarium (or ovary) which is anterior to the testis and loops around the right intestinal caecum

== Genera ==
The genera recognized in WoRMS are:

- Acanthocercodes Kritsky & Diggles, 2015
- Acleotrema Johnston & Tiegs, 1922
- Aetheolabes Boeger & Kritsky, 2009
- Anoplectanum Boeger, Fehlauer & Marques, 2006
- Calydiscoides Young, 1969
- Darwinoplectanum Domingues, Diamanka & Pariselle, 2011
- Diplectanocotyla Yamaguti, 1953
- Diplectanum Diesing, 1858
- Echinoplectanum Justine & Euzet, 2006
- Furcohaptor Bijukumar & Kearn, 1996
- Lamellodiscus Johnston & Tiegs, 1922
- Latericaecum Young, 1969
- Laticola Yang, Kritsky, Sun, Zhang, Shi & Agrawal, 2006
- Lepidotrema Johnston & Tiegs, 1922
- Lobotrema Tripathi, 1959
- Monoplectanum Young, 1969
- Murraytrema Price, 1937
- Murraytrematoides Yamaguti, 1958
- Nasobranchitrema Yamaguti, 1965
- Neodiplectanum Mizelle & Blatz, 1941
- Oliveriplectanum Domingues & Boeger, 2008
- Paradiplectanum Domingues & Boeger, 2008
- Protolamellodiscus Oliver, 1969
- Pseudodiplectanum Tripathi, 1955
- Pseudolamellodiscus Yamaguti, 1953
- Pseudomurraytrematoides Domingues & Boeger, 2008
- Pseudorhabdosynochus Yamaguti, 1958
- Pseudorhamnocercoides Chero, Cruces, Sáez, Iannacone & Luque, 2017
- Rhabdosynochus Mizelle & Blatz, 1941
- Rhamnocercoides Luque & Iannacone, 1991
- Rhamnocercus Monaco, Wood & Mizelle, 1954
- Sinodiplectanotrema Zhang in Zhang, Yang & Liu, 2001
- Spinomatrix Boeger, Fehlauer & Marques, 2006
- Telegamatrix Ramalingam, 1955
- Teraplectanum Lim, 2015
