= Pseudolamellodiscus =

Scientific classification
- Kingdom: Animalia
- Phylum: Platyhelminthes
- Class: Monogenea
- Order: Dactylogyridea
- Family: Diplectanidae
- Genus: Pseudolamellodiscus; Yamaguti, 1953

Species
- See text

Genus of worms

Pseudolamellodiscus is a genus of monopisthocotylean monogeneans in the family Diplectanidae. Species of Pseudolamellodiscus are parasites on the gills of marine perciform fish (Sphyraenidae and Polynemidae).

== Species ==
According to the World Register of Marine Species, the following species are included in the genus:

- Pseudolamellodiscus forsterii Rakotofiringa & Maillard, 1979
- Pseudolamellodiscus jelloi Rakotofiringa & Maillard, 1979
- Pseudolamellodiscus nossibei Euzet & Razarihelisoa, 1959
- Pseudolamellodiscus polynemus Rao & Kulkarni, 1985
- Pseudolamellodiscus sphyraenae Yamaguti, 1953 (Type species)
