= Gyrodactylus leptorhynchi =

Scientific classification
- Kingdom: Animalia
- Phylum: Platyhelminthes
- Class: Monogenea
- Order: Gyrodactylidea
- Family: Gyrodactylidae
- Genus: Gyrodactylus
- Species: G. leptorhynchi

Binomial name
- Gyrodactylus leptorhynchi Cone, Appy, Baggett, King, Gilmore & Abbott, 2013

Species of flatworm

Gyrodactylus leptorhynchi is a small monogenean (about 0.5 mm long) obligate ectoparasite which parasitizes freshwater bay pipefish. Gyrodactylus leptorhynchi is the seventh Gyrodactylus species known to infect bay pipefish and the first characterized along the Pacific coast of North America. The parasite can get into captive fish environments, such as fish farms and aquariums, where it may spread in as little as 10 days. Gyrodactylus species are known to centralize on the brood pouch in male fish, this may allow for transmission to newly hatched young. However, in Gyrodactylus leptorhynchi the parasite was found mostly found attached to body surfaces such as the dorsal fins.

== Lifecycle ==
Gyrodactylus species are skin flukes that have direct life cycles of about 1 to 5 days, with no intermediate hosts or stages and are viviparous (uterus of embryo contains an embryo which contains a third embryo in its uterus, so young can give live birth). Damage to the host is caused by the marginal hook, this hook can cause tissue damage as well as irritation.

== Morphology ==
Gyrodactylus leptorhynchi has a bilobed cephalic region containing cephalic glands, pharynx, indistinct esophagus, intestinal crura, stout hamuli, male reproductive system (including brood pouch) with no evident seminal vesicle, prostatic glands and vas deferens in male systems, a marginal hook (used for attaching to the host) and spiked sensilla (sensing organ).

== Prevalence ==
Gyrodactylus marine species are found parasitizing fish in both hemispheres as well as in the Pacific and Atlantic oceans. Prevalence in non captive fish species is unknown but research indicates that transmission and parasite density is higher in captive environments.

== Treatment ==
Gyrodactylus infections in fish tanks can be treated using a combination of formalin, trichlorfon and praziquantel for a minimum of 17 days with none/little risk for bay pipefish mortality. However, all three can be used individually, as can mebendazole, but there may be difficulty in completely eradicating the parasite from fish tanks.

== Detection ==
The common technique to detect Gyrodactylus infection is microscopic examinations of skin scrapes, however, (Cone et al., 2013) contests that this practice is both damaging to the pipefish but also unreliable. The authors, Cone et al. (2013), recommend examining live pipefish in a cool seawater Petri dish under a microscope.
