= Diplectanocotyla =

Scientific classification
- Kingdom: Animalia
- Phylum: Platyhelminthes
- Class: Monogenea
- Order: Dactylogyridea
- Family: Diplectanidae
- Genus: Diplectanocotyla; Yamaguti, 1953

Species
- See text

Genus of flatworms

Diplectanocotyla is a genus of monopisthocotylean monogeneans, belonging to the family Diplectanidae. All members of this genus are parasitic on the gills of megalopid fish.

== Species ==
According to the World Register of Marine Species, the valid species included in the genus are:

- Diplectanocotyla gracilis Yamaguti, 1953
- Diplectanocotyla langkawiensis Lim & Gibson, 2007
- Diplectanocotyla megalopis Rakotofiringa & Oliver, 1987
- Diplectanocotyla parva Lim & Gibson, 2007
