= Micropolyclithrum =

Scientific classification
- Kingdom: Animalia
- Phylum: Platyhelminthes
- Class: Monogenea
- Order: Gyrodactylidea
- Family: Gyrodactylidae
- Genus: Micropolyclithrum; Skinner, 1975

Genus of flatworms

Micropolyclithrum is a genus of monogeneans in the family Gyrodactylidae. It consists of one species, Micropolyclithrum parvum Skinner, 1975.
