= Spinomatrix =

Scientific classification
- Kingdom: Animalia
- Phylum: Platyhelminthes
- Class: Monogenea
- Order: Dactylogyridea
- Family: Diplectanidae
- Genus: Spinomatrix; Boeger, Fehlauer & Marques, 2006
- Species: S. penteormos

Binomial name
- Spinomatrix penteormos Boeger, Fehlauer & Marques, 2006

Genus of flatworms

Spinomatrix is a genus of monopisthocotylean monogeneans in the family Diplectanidae, containing the sole species Spinomatrix penteormos.

== Etymology ==
The generic name is derived from the Greek words spina ("thorn") and matrix ("where something originates"), referring to "the extensive presence of spines on the peduncle and haptor of the species of the genus". The specific epithet is derived from the Greek pente ("five") and ormos ("anchorage"), in reference to "the presence of five types of anchoring structures on the haptor and peduncle of the species of the genus: ventral and dorsal anchors, peduncular spines, hooks, haptoral spines, and squamodiscs".
