= Pseudodiplectanum =

Scientific classification
- Domain: Eukaryota
- Kingdom: Animalia
- Phylum: Platyhelminthes
- Class: Monogenea
- Order: Dactylogyridea
- Family: Diplectanidae
- Genus: Pseudodiplectanum; Tripathi, 1955

Species
- See text

Genus of worms

Pseudodiplectanum is a genus of monopisthocotylean monogeneans, belonging to the family Diplectanidae. Species of Pseudodiplectanum are parasites of marine teleost fish (Pleuronectiformes and Osteoglossiformes).

== Species ==
According to the World Register of Marine Species, the following species are included in the genus:

- Pseudodiplectanum bychowskii Nagibina, 1977
- Pseudodiplectanum caballeroi Nagibina, 1977
- Pseudodiplectanum cynoglossum Tripathi, 1955
- Pseudodiplectanum gibsoni Oliver, 1987
- Pseudodiplectanum kearnei Vala, Lopez-Roman & Aboudaoud, 1980
- Pseudodiplectanum kearni Oliver, 1980
- Pseudodiplectanum lucknowense Agrawal & Sharma, 1986
- Pseudodiplectanum syrticum Derbel, Boudaya & Neifar, 2007
