= Archigyrodactylus =

Scientific classification
- Kingdom: Animalia
- Phylum: Platyhelminthes
- Class: Monogenea
- Order: Gyrodactylidea
- Family: Gyrodactylidae
- Genus: Archigyrodactylus; Mizelle & Kritsky, 1967
- Species: A. archigyrodactylus

Binomial name
- Archigyrodactylus archigyrodactylus Mizelle & Kritsky, 1967

Genus of flatworms

Archigyrodactylus is a genus of monogeneans in the family Gyrodactylidae. It consists of one species, Archigyrodactylus archigyrodactylus Mizelle & Kritsky, 1967.
