= Swingleus =

Scientific classification
- Kingdom: Animalia
- Phylum: Platyhelminthes
- Class: Monogenea
- Order: Gyrodactylidea
- Family: Gyrodactylidae
- Genus: Swingleus; Rogers, 1969

Genus of flatworms

Swingleus is a genus of monogeneans in the family Gyrodactylidae. It consists of two species, Swingleus polyclithroides Rogers, 1969. and Swingleus ancistrus Billeter, Klink & Maugel, 2000. Swingleus has been reported from the skin and fins of Fundulus grandis and Fundulus heteroclitus but not from the gills. S. polyclithroides was reported from Mobile Bay, AL and S. ancistrus has been reported from Fundulus heteroclitus ranging from Long Island Sound, NY to Pamlico Sound, NC.
