= Paragyrodactylus =

Scientific classification
- Kingdom: Animalia
- Phylum: Platyhelminthes
- Class: Monogenea
- Order: Gyrodactylidea
- Family: Gyrodactylidae
- Genus: Paragyrodactylus; Gvozdev & Matrechov, 1953

Genus of flatworms

Paragyrodactylus is a genus of monogeneans in the family Gyrodactylidae.

== Species ==
- Paragyrodactylus barbatuli Ergens, 1970
- Paragyrodactylus iliensis Gvosdev & Martechov, 1953
- Paragyrodactylus variegatus You, King, Ye & Cone, 2014
