= Furcohaptor =

Scientific classification
- Domain: Eukaryota
- Kingdom: Animalia
- Phylum: Platyhelminthes
- Class: Monogenea
- Order: Dactylogyridea
- Family: Diplectanidae
- Genus: Furcohaptor; Bijukumar & Kearn, 1996

Species
- See text

Genus of flatworms

Furcohaptor is a genus of monopisthocotylean monogeneans, belonging to the family Diplectanidae. All known species are parasitic on the gills of tonguefish (family Cynoglossidae).

Members of the genus Furcohaptor have a haptor with atypical structure (two long haptoral arms, one pair of typical anchors, one pair of rod-shaped hooks, five pairs of typical-shaped marginal hooks, and one pair of marginal hooks which are reduced in size) and the genus was originally placed in the family Ancyrocephalidae, but a study based on morphology and molecules demonstrated in 2017 that it was a member of the Diplectanidae.

== Etymology ==
The generic name, Furcohaptor, is in reference to the specimens' bifurcate haptors.

== Species ==
According to the World Register of Marine Species, the valid species included in the genus are:

- Furcohaptor brevis Nitta & Nagasawa, 2017
- Furcohaptor cynoglossi Bijukumar & Kearn, 1996
