= Pseudorhamnocercoides =

Scientific classification
- Kingdom: Animalia
- Phylum: Platyhelminthes
- Class: Monogenea
- Order: Dactylogyridea
- Family: Diplectanidae
- Genus: Pseudorhamnocercoides; Chero, Cruces, Sáez, Iannacone & Luque, 2017
- Species: P. stichospinus

Binomial name
- Pseudorhamnocercoides stichospinus (Seamster & Monaco, 1956) Chero, Cruces, Sáez, Iannacone & Luque, 2017

Genus of worms

Pseudorhamnocercoides is a genus of monogeneans in the family Diplectanidae. The genus is monospecific, containing the single species Pseudorhamnocercoides stichospinus.

== Etymology ==
The generic name refers "to the several misidentifications of the single species of the new genus as Rhamnocercoides".
