= Rhamnocercoides =

Scientific classification
- Domain: Eukaryota
- Kingdom: Animalia
- Phylum: Platyhelminthes
- Class: Monogenea
- Order: Dactylogyridea
- Family: Diplectanidae
- Genus: Rhamnocercoides; Luque & Iannacone, 1991

Species
- See text

Genus of worms

Rhamnocercoides is a genus of monopisthocotylean monogeneans, belonging to the family Diplectanidae. All species of Rhamnocercoides are parasites of marine perciform fishes of the family Sciaenidae.

== Etymology ==
The generic name is based "in the morphological similarity with the genus Rhamnocercus".

== Species ==
According to the World Register of Marine Species, two species are included in the genus:

- Rhamnocercoides dominguesi Chero, Cruces, Sáez, Iannacone & Luque, 2017
- Rhamnocercoides menticirrhi Luque & Iannacone, 1991
