= Murraytrema =

Scientific classification
- Kingdom: Animalia
- Phylum: Platyhelminthes
- Class: Monogenea
- Order: Dactylogyridea
- Family: Diplectanidae
- Genus: Murraytrema; Price, 1937

Genus of worms

Murraytrema is a genus of monopisthocotylean monogeneans, belonging to the family Diplectanidae. Species of this genus are parasitic on the gills of marine fish of the families Sciaenidae and Sparidae.

== Etymology ==
Though not specifically stated as such in the original description, the generic name was given in honor of Florence Murray, who originally described the type species of the genus as Ancyrocephalus robusta before it was later redescribed as Murraytrema robustum.

== Species ==
According to the World Register of Marine Species, species in this genus include:

- Murraytrema bychowskyi Oliver, 1987
- Murraytrema johniui Yao, Wang, Xia & Chen, 1998
- Murraytrema pricei Bychowsky & Nagibina, 1977
- Murraytrema robustum (Murray, 1931) Price, 1937 (type species)
