= Gyrodactyloides =

Scientific classification
- Kingdom: Animalia
- Phylum: Platyhelminthes
- Class: Monogenea
- Order: Gyrodactylidea
- Family: Gyrodactylidae
- Genus: Gyrodactyloides; Bykhovskiĭ, 1947

Genus of flatworms

Gyrodactyloides is a genus of monogeneans in the family Gyrodactylidae.

== Species ==
- Gyrodactyloides andriaschewi Bykhovskiĭ & Polyanskiĭ, 1953
- Gyrodactyloides baueri Kulachkova, 1970
- Gyrodactyloides bychowskii Albova, 1948
- Gyrodactyloides dogieli Zhukov, 1960
- Gyrodactyloides petruschewskii Bykhovskiĭ, 1947
