= Sinodiplectanotrema =

Scientific classification
- Domain: Eukaryota
- Kingdom: Animalia
- Phylum: Platyhelminthes
- Class: Monogenea
- Order: Dactylogyridea
- Family: Diplectanidae
- Genus: Sinodiplectanotrema; Zhang in Zhang, Yang & Liu, 2001

Genus of worms

Sinodiplectanotrema is a genus of monopisthocotylean monogeneans, belonging to the family Diplectanidae.

Sinodiplectanotrema was assigned to the family Ancyrocephalidae when the genus was created and later transferred to the family Diplectanidae on the basis of a molecular and morphological study.

== Species ==
According to the World Register of Marine Species, two species are included in the genus:

- Sinodiplectanotrema argyromus Zhang in Zhang, Yang & Liu, 2001 (type species)
- Sinodiplectanotrema malayanum Lim, Tan & Gibson, 2010

Both species are parasite on the bigeye croaker Pennahia anea (Sciaenidae).
