= Darwinoplectanum =

Scientific classification
- Kingdom: Animalia
- Phylum: Platyhelminthes
- Class: Monogenea
- Order: Dactylogyridea
- Family: Diplectanidae
- Genus: Darwinoplectanum; Domingues, Diamanka & Pariselle, 2011

Genus of flatworms

Darwinoplectanum is a genus of monopisthocotylean monogeneans, belonging to the family Diplectanidae. According to the authors of the genus, it was named after Sir Charles Robert Darwin, "in celebration of his 200th anniversary in 2009".

== Species ==
According to the World Register of Marine Species, the valid species included in the genus are:

- Darwinoplectanum amphiatlanticum Domingues, Diamanka & Pariselle, 2011
- Darwinoplectanum figueiredoi Domingues, Diamanka & Pariselle, 2011
- Darwinoplectanum pilittae Domingues, Diamanka & Pariselle, 2011
