= Aetheolabes =

Scientific classification
- Kingdom: Animalia
- Phylum: Platyhelminthes
- Class: Monogenea
- Order: Dactylogyridea
- Family: Diplectanidae
- Genus: Aetheolabes; Boeger & Kritsky, 2009
- Species: A. goeldiensis

Binomial name
- Aetheolabes goeldiensis Boeger & Kritsky, 2009

Genus of flatworms

Aetheolabes is a genus of monopisthocotylean monogeneans in the family Diplectanidae.

== Etymology ==
The generic name is derived from the Ancient Greek aethes ("strange") and labes ("tool to grasp, forceps, tongs"), referring to the haptor's morphology.

== Species ==
According to the World Register of Marine Species, the only species included in the genus is Aetheolabes goeldiensis.
