= Isancistrum =

Scientific classification
- Kingdom: Animalia
- Phylum: Platyhelminthes
- Class: Monogenea
- Order: Gyrodactylidea
- Family: Gyrodactylidae
- Genus: Isancistrum de Beauchamp, 1912

Genus of flatworms

Isancistrum is a genus of monogeneans in the family Gyrodactylidae. Unlike most monogeneans which are parasitic on fish or other vertebrates, species of Isancistrum are parasitic on squids (molluscs).

== Species ==
- Isancistrum loliginis de Beauchamp, 1912
- Isancistrum subulatae Llewellyn, 1984
