= Citharodactylus =

Scientific classification
- Kingdom: Animalia
- Phylum: Platyhelminthes
- Class: Monogenea
- Order: Gyrodactylidea
- Family: Gyrodactylidae
- Genus: Citharodactylus; Přikrylová, Shinn & Paladini, 2017
- Species: C. gagei

Binomial name
- Citharodactylus gagei Přikrylová, Shinn & Paladini, 2017

Genus of flatworms

Citharodactylus is a genus of monogeneans in the family Gyrodactylidae. It consists of one species, Citharodactylus gagei.

== Etymology ==
The generic name is derived from that of the type-host, Citharinus citharus. The specific epithet is derived from the local Turkana name of said host, gage.
