= Laminiscus =

Scientific classification
- Kingdom: Animalia
- Phylum: Platyhelminthes
- Class: Monogenea
- Order: Gyrodactylidea
- Family: Gyrodactylidae
- Genus: Laminiscus; Pálsson & Beverley-Burton, 1983

Genus of flatworms

Laminiscus is a genus of monogeneans in the family Gyrodactylidae. It consists of one species, Laminiscus gussevi (Bykhovskiĭ & Polyanskiĭ, 1953). Laminiscus is a marine parasite, using its haptor to attach itself to a marine fish host (Přikrylová et al., 2013). Its haptor consists of no dorsal bar, additional internal support plates, hamuli with distinct dorsal and ventral roots, and marginal hook sickles with poorly developed heels and short handles (Cone et al., 2010).
