= Paradiplectanum =

Scientific classification
- Kingdom: Animalia
- Phylum: Platyhelminthes
- Class: Monogenea
- Order: Dactylogyridea
- Family: Diplectanidae
- Genus: Paradiplectanum; Domingues & Boeger, 2008

Species
- See text

Genus of worms

Paradiplectanum is a genus of monopisthocotylean monogeneans in the family Diplectanidae. All its species are parasites on marine perciform fishes of the family Sillaginidae.

== Species ==
According to the World Register of Marine Species, there are only two species in the genus:

- Paradiplectanum blairense (Gupta & Khanna, 1974) Domingues & Boeger, 2008
- Paradiplectanum sillagonum (Tripathi, 1959) Domingues & Boeger, 2008
