= Polyclithrum =

Scientific classification
- Kingdom: Animalia
- Phylum: Platyhelminthes
- Class: Monogenea
- Order: Gyrodactylidea
- Family: Gyrodactylidae
- Genus: Polyclithrum; Rogers, 1967

Genus of flatworms

Polyclithrum is a genus of monogeneans in the family Gyrodactylidae.

== Species ==
- Polyclithrum alberti Ernst, Whittington & Jones, 2000
- Polyclithrum boegeri Ernst, Whittington & Jones, 2000
- Polyclithrum corallense Ernst, Whittington & Jones, 2000
- Polyclithrum gerasevi Gaevskaya & Dmitrieva, 1997
- Polyclithrum mugilini Rogers, 1967
- Polyclithrum ponticum Gerasev, Dmitrieva & Gaevskaya, 2002
- Polyclithrum rodgersi Dmitrieva, Gerasev, Gibson, Pronkina & Galli, 2012
