= Gyrocerviceanseris =

Scientific classification
- Kingdom: Animalia
- Phylum: Platyhelminthes
- Class: Monogenea
- Order: Gyrodactylidea
- Family: Gyrodactylidae
- Genus: Gyrocerviceanseris; Cone, Abbott, Gilmore & Burt, 2010
- Species: G. passamaquoddyensis

Binomial name
- Gyrocerviceanseris passamaquoddyensis Cone, Abbott, Gilmore & Burt, 2010

Genus of flatworms

Gyrocerviceanseris is a genus of monogeneans in the family Gyrodactylidae. It consists of one species, Gyrocerviceanseris passamaquoddyensis.

== Etymology ==
The genus name is derived from cervicus, meaning "neck", and anseris, meaning "goose"; therefore, the genus name literally means "goose-neck", in reference to the shape of the hamulus root. The specific epithet is derived from the species' type locality, Passamaquoddy Bay.
