= Acanthocercodes =

Scientific classification
- Kingdom: Animalia
- Phylum: Platyhelminthes
- Class: Monogenea
- Order: Dactylogyridea
- Family: Diplectanidae
- Genus: Acanthocercodes; Kritsky & Diggles, 2015

Species
- See text

Genus of flatworms

Acanthocercodes is a genus of monopisthocotylean monogeneans, belonging to the family Diplectanidae. All its species are parasites of the gill lamellae of marine teleosts. The type-species of the genus is Acanthocercodes bullardi.

== Etymology ==
The generic name is derived from the Ancient Greek acantha, "thorn", and cercos, "tail", with the suffix -odes ("like") appended, referring to the "spiny peduncle of the body proper."

== Species ==
According to the World Register of Marine Species, species include:

- Acanthocercodes bullardi
- Acanthocercodes megacirrus
- Acanthocercodes polynemus
- Acanthocercodes spinosus
