= Telegamatrix =

Scientific classification
- Domain: Eukaryota
- Kingdom: Animalia
- Phylum: Platyhelminthes
- Class: Monogenea
- Order: Dactylogyridea
- Family: Diplectanidae
- Genus: Telegamatrix; Ramalingam, 1955

Species
- See text

Genus of worms

Telegamatrix is a genus of monopisthocotylean monogeneans, belonging to the family Diplectanidae. Species of Telegamatrix are parasitic on the gills of marine fish of the families Clupeidae and Leiognathidae.

In the original description of the type species and genus, Ramalingam (1955) wrote: "It is seldom that an entirely novel animal is found, but Telegamatrix seems to be a unique example in evolution of what would appear to be an ideal copulatory arrangement for a sedentary hermaphrodite, whether animal or lower plant." Indeed, the genital apparatus of species of Telegamatrix include a spectacular "tentacle" as long as an adult (i.e. about 1 mm).

== Species ==
According to the World Register of Marine Species, the following species are included in the genus:

- Telegamatrix elegans Bychowsky & Nagibina, 1976
- Telegamatrix grandis Bychowsky & Nagibina, 1976
- Telegamatrix pellona Ramalingam, 1955 (type species)
- Telegamatrix ramalingami Bychowsky & Nagibina, 1976
