= Fundulotrema =

Scientific classification
- Kingdom: Animalia
- Phylum: Platyhelminthes
- Class: Monogenea
- Order: Gyrodactylidea
- Family: Gyrodactylidae
- Genus: Fundulotrema; Kritsky & Thatcher, 1977

Genus of flatworms

Fundulotrema is a genus of monogeneans in the family Gyrodactylidae.

== Species ==
- Fundulotrema foxi (Rawson, 1973) Kritsky & Thatcher, 1977
- Fundulotrema megacanthus (Wellborn & Rogers, 1967) Kritsky & Thatcher, 1977
- Fundulotrema porterensis King & Cone, 2009
- Fundulotrema prolongis (Hargis, 1955) Kritsky & Thatcher, 1977
- Fundulotrema stableri (Hathaway & Herlevich, 1973) Kritsky & Thatcher, 1977
- Fundulotrema trematoclithrus (Rogers, 1967) Kritsky & Thatcher, 1977
