= Monoplectanum =

Scientific classification
- Kingdom: Animalia
- Phylum: Platyhelminthes
- Class: Monogenea
- Order: Dactylogyridea
- Family: Diplectanidae
- Genus: Monoplectanum; Young, 1969

Species
- See text

Genus of worms

Monoplectanum is a genus of monopisthocotylean monogeneans, belonging to the family Diplectanidae. All its species are parasites on fish of the family Sillaginidae.

Species of Monoplectanum are special among diplectanids in that they have only one squamodisc (generally two in species of other genera), hence the name of the genus.

== Species ==
According to the World Register of Marine Species, there are only two species in the genus:

- Monoplectanum australe Young, 1969 (type-species)
- Monoplectanum youngi Hayward, 1996
