= Latericaecum =

Scientific classification
- Kingdom: Animalia
- Phylum: Platyhelminthes
- Class: Monogenea
- Order: Dactylogyridea
- Family: Diplectanidae
- Genus: Latericaecum; Young, 1969

Genus of worms

Latericaecum is a genus of monopisthocotylean monogeneans, belonging to the family Diplectanidae.

== Species ==
According to the World Register of Marine Species, the two valid species included in the genus are:

- Latericaecum cazauxi (Oliver & Paperna, 1984) Domingues & Boeger, 2008
- Latericaecum pearsoni Young, 1969
