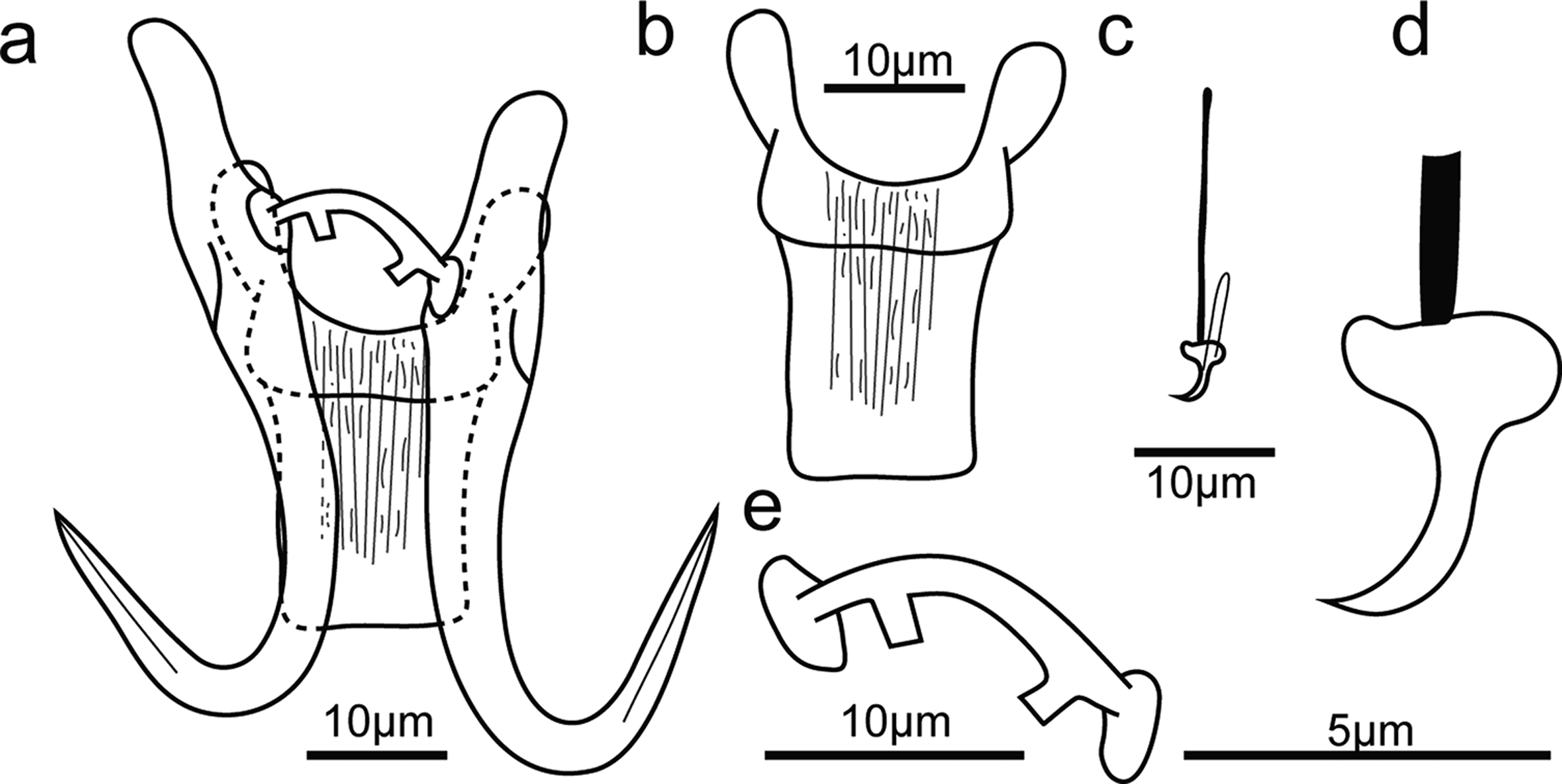
- Gyrodactylus sp. (sclerotised parts)

Scientific classification
- Kingdom: Animalia
- Phylum: Platyhelminthes
- Class: Monogenea
- Order: Gyrodactylidea
- Family: Gyrodactylidae
- Genus: Gyrodactylus von Nordmann, 1832

= Gyrodactylus =

Genus of flatworms

Gyrodactylus is a genus of parasitic flatworms in the family Gyrodactylidae.

== Species ==
Species listed in the World Register of Marine Species:

- Gyrodactylus adspersi Cone & Wiles, 1983
- Gyrodactylus aeglefini (Bychowsky & Polyansky, 1953) Malmberg, 1970
- Gyrodactylus aggregata Mizelle & Kritsky, 1967
- Gyrodactylus alexgusevi Zietara & Lumme, 2003
- Gyrodactylus alviga Gaevskaya & Dmitrieva, 1967
- Gyrodactylus anarhichatis Mo & Lile, 1998
- Gyrodactylus anguillae Ergens, 1960
- Gyrodactylus aphyae Malmberg, 1957
- Gyrodactylus arcuatoides Huyse, Malmberg & Volckaert, 2004
- Gyrodactylus arcuatus Bychowsky, 1933
- Gyrodactylus atherinae Bychowsky, 1933
- Gyrodactylus australis Gusev, 1966
- Gyrodactylus avalonia Hanek & Threlfall, 1969
- Gyrodactylus blennii Gaevskaya & Dmitrieva, 1997
- Gyrodactylus branchialis Huyse, Malmberg & Volckaert, 2004
- Gyrodactylus branchicus Malmberg, 1964
- Gyrodactylus bubyri Osmanov, 1965
- Gyrodactylus bullatarudis Turnbull, 1956
- Gyrodactylus bychowskyi (Albova, 1948)
- Gyrodactylus callariatis Malmberg, 1957
- Gyrodactylus canadensis Hanek & Threlfall, 1969
- Gyrodactylus chileani Ziętara, Lebedeva, Muñoz & Lumme, 2012
- Gyrodactylus corleonis Paladini, Cable Fioravanti, Faria & Shinn, 2010
- Gyrodactylus crenilabri Zaika, 1966
- Gyrodactylus cryptarum Malmberg, 1970
- Gyrodactylus curemae Conroy & Conroy, 1985
- Gyrodactylus cyclopteri Scyborskaya, 1948
- Gyrodactylus derjavini Mikailov, 1975
- Gyrodactylus derjavinoides Malmberg, Collins, Cunningham & Jalali, 2007
- Gyrodactylus elegini (Bychowsky, 1948) Malmberg, 1964
- Gyrodactylus emembranatus Malmberg, 1970
- Gyrodactylus errabundus Malmberg, 1970
- Gyrodactylus eutheraponsis Venkatanarsaiah & Kulkarni, 1980
- Gyrodactylus eyipayipi Vaughan, Christison, Hansen & Shinn, 2010
- Gyrodactylus flavescensis Huyse, Malmberg & Volckaert, 2004
- Gyrodactylus flesi Malmberg, 1957
- Gyrodactylus flexibiliradix Malmberg, 1970
- Gyrodactylus gerdi Bychowsky, 1948
- Gyrodactylus gondae Huyse, Malmberg & Volckaert, 2004
- Gyrodactylus gracilihamatus Malmberg, 1964
- Gyrodactylus groenlandicus Levinsen, 1881
- Gyrodactylus harengi Malmberg, 1957
- Gyrodactylus jussii Zietara & Lumme, 2003
- Gyrodactylus kobayashii Hukuda, 1940
- Gyrodactylus kutikovana Malmberg, 1964
- Gyrodactylus lateolabrax Yang & Liu in Zhang, Yang & Liu, 2001
- Gyrodactylus lavareti Malmberg, 1957
- Gyrodactylus leopardinus Dmitrieva & Skidan, 2005
- Gyrodactylus leptorhynchi Cone, Appy, Baggett, King, Gilmore & Abbott, 2013
- Gyrodactylus longidactylus Geets, Malmberg & Ollevier, 1998
- Gyrodactylus luciopercae Gussev, 1962
- Gyrodactylus macracanthus Hukuda, 1940
- Gyrodactylus macronychus Malmberg, 1957
- Gyrodactylus maculosi Cone & Rotn, 1993
- Gyrodactylus magadiensis Dos Santos, Ndegwa Maina & Avenant-Oldewage, 2019
- Gyrodactylus marinus Bychowsky & Polyansky, 1953
- Gyrodactylus medius Kathariner, 1895
- Gyrodactylus microanchoratus Mo & Lile, 1998
- Gyrodactylus micropsi Glaser, 1974
- Gyrodactylus mugili Zhukov, 1970
- Gyrodactylus nainum Hanek & Threlfall, 1970
- Gyrodactylus najdenovi Malmberg, 1970
- Gyrodactylus neretum Paladini, Cable Fioravanti, Faria & Shinn, 2010
- Gyrodactylus ostendicus Huyse & Malmberg, 2004
- Gyrodactylus pannonicus Molnar, 1968
- Gyrodactylus pardalidis Ogawa & Inouye, 1997
- Gyrodactylus patersoni King, Bentzen & Cone, 2014
- Gyrodactylus perlucidus Bykhovsky & Polyansky, 1953
- Gyrodactylus pharyngicus Malmberg, 1964
- Gyrodactylus pleuronecti Cone, 1981
- Gyrodactylus plotosi Mayes & Brooks, 1977
- Gyrodactylus proterorhini Ergens, 1964
- Gyrodactylus pterygialis Bychowsky & Polyansky, 1953
- Gyrodactylus pungitii Malmberg, 1964
- Gyrodactylus quadratidigitus Longshaw, Pursglove & Shinn, 2003
- Gyrodactylus rarus Wagener, 1910
- Gyrodactylus robustus Malmberg, 1957
- Gyrodactylus rubripedis Ogawa & Inouye, 1997
- Gyrodactylus rugiensis Glaser, 1974
- Gyrodactylus rugiensoides Huyse & Volckaert, 2002
- Gyrodactylus salaris Malmberg, 1957
- Gyrodactylus salinae Paladini, Huyse & Shinn, 2011
- Gyrodactylus salmonis Yin & Sproston, 1948
- Gyrodactylus sphinx Dmitrieva & Gerasev, 2000
- Gyrodactylus stephanus Müller, 1937
- Gyrodactylus syngnathi Appleby, 1996
- Gyrodactylus unicopula Glukhova, 1955
- Gyrodactylus unipons Malmberg, 1970
- Gyrodactylus xiamenensis Yang & Liu in Zhang, Yang & Liu, 2001
- Gyrodactylus zhukovi Ling, 1962

Other species:

- Gyrodactylus benedeni
- Gyrodactylus bios
- Gyrodactylus dorlodoti
- Gyrodactylus elegans von Nordmann, 1832
- Gyrodactylus mediotorus King, Marcogliese, Forest, McLaughlin & Bentzen, 2013
- Gyrodactylus turnbulli
