= Anoplectanum =

Scientific classification
- Kingdom: Animalia
- Phylum: Platyhelminthes
- Class: Monogenea
- Order: Dactylogyridea
- Family: Diplectanidae
- Genus: Anoplectanum; Boeger, Fehlauer & Marques, 2006

Species
- See text

Genus of flatworms

Anoplectanum is a genus of monopisthocotylean monogeneans in the family Diplectanidae.

== Species ==
According to the World Register of Marine Species, the valid species included in the genus are:

- Anoplectanum haptorodynatum Boeger, Fehlauer & Marques, 2006
- Anoplectanum microsoma Boeger, Fehlauer & Marques, 2006
