= Acanthoplacatus =

Scientific classification
- Kingdom: Animalia
- Phylum: Platyhelminthes
- Class: Monogenea
- Order: Gyrodactylidea
- Family: Gyrodactylidae
- Genus: Acanthoplacatus; Ernst, Jones & Whittington, 2001

Genus of flatworms

Acanthoplacatus is a genus of monogeneans in the family Gyrodactylidae.

== Etymology ==
The generic name is derived from the Latin words acantho ("thorn") and placatus ("idle"), in reference to the idle nature of hamuli in the genus.

== Species ==
- Acanthoplacatus adlardi Ernst, Jones & Whittington, 2001
- Acanthoplacatus amplihamus Ernst, Jones & Whittington, 2001
- Acanthoplacatus brauni Ernst, Jones & Whittington, 2001
- Acanthoplacatus parvihamus Ernst, Jones & Whittington, 2001
- Acanthoplacatus puelli Ernst, Jones & Whittington, 2001
- Acanthoplacatus shieldsi Ernst, Jones & Whittington, 2001
- Acanthoplacatus sigani Ernst, Jones & Whittington, 2001
