= Udonellidae =

Scientific classification
- Kingdom: Animalia
- Phylum: Platyhelminthes
- Class: Monogenea
- Order: Gyrodactylidea
- Family: Udonellidae; Taschenberg, 1879

Family of flatworms

Udonellidae is a family of flatworms belonging to the order Gyrodactylidea.

Genera:

- Udonella Johnston, 1835
