= Anoplodiscidae =

Scientific classification
- Kingdom: Animalia
- Phylum: Platyhelminthes
- Class: Monogenea
- Order: Gyrodactylidea
- Family: Anoplodiscidae; Tagliani, 1912

Family of worms

Anoplodiscidae is a family of flatworms belonging to the order Gyrodactylidea.

Genera:

- Anoplodiscus Sonsino, 1890
