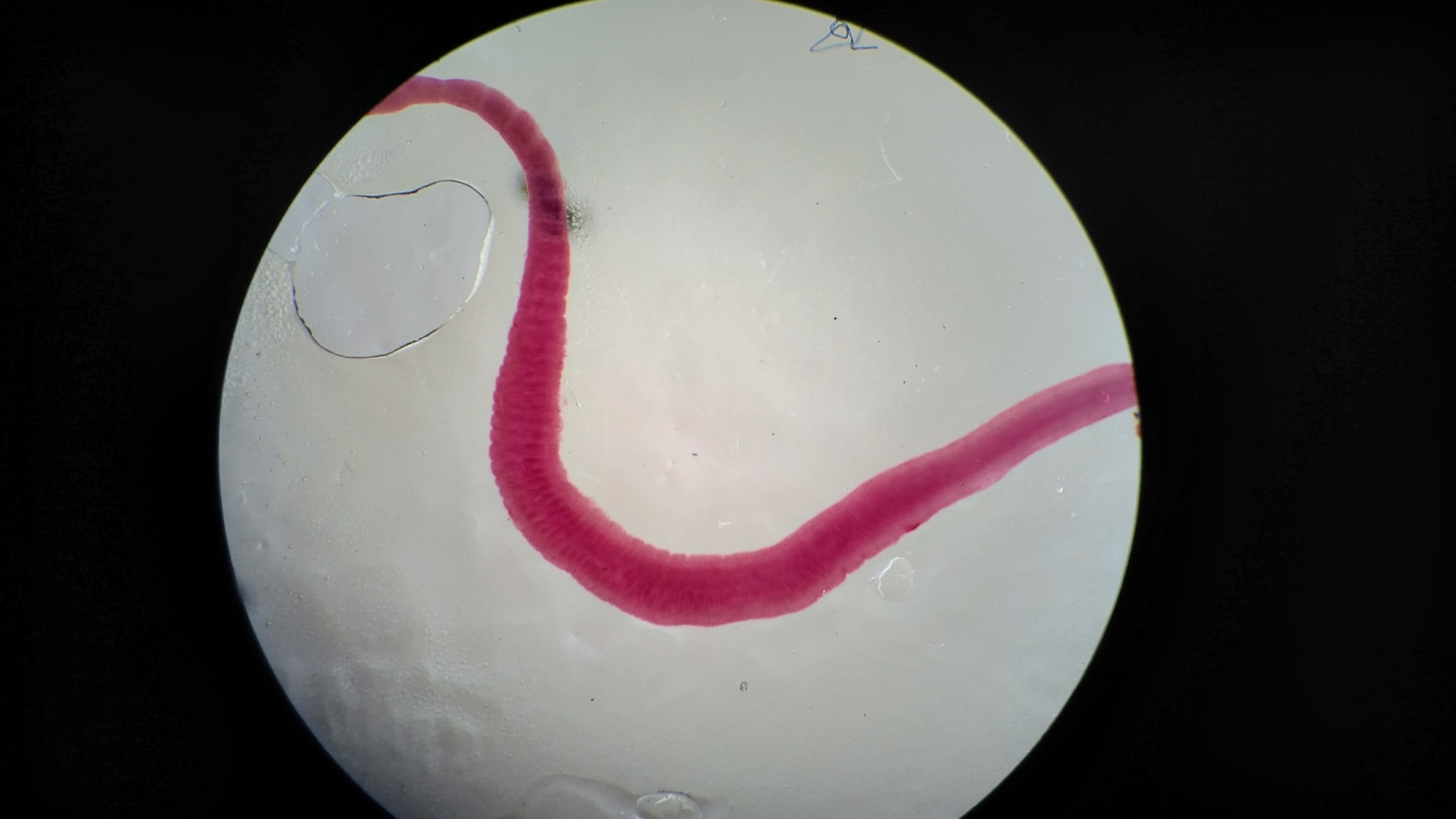
- Nematotaenia dispar

Scientific classification
- Kingdom: Animalia
- Phylum: Platyhelminthes
- Class: Cestoda
- Order: Cyclophyllidea
- Family: Nematotaeniidae; Lühe, 1910

= Nematotaeniidae =

Family of flatworms

Nematotaeniidae is a family of tapeworms. They are parasites of amphibians and reptiles.

== Taxonomy ==
The family includes six genera:

- Baerietta Hsü, 1935
- Bitegmen Jones, 1987
- Cylindrotaenia Jewell, 1916
- Distoichometra Dickey, 1921
- Lanfrediella Melo, Giese, Furtado, Soares, Gonçalves, Vallinoto & dos Santos, 2011
- Nematotaenia Lühe, 1899
