= Pseudomurraytrematoides =

Scientific classification
- Kingdom: Animalia
- Phylum: Platyhelminthes
- Class: Monogenea
- Order: Dactylogyridea
- Family: Diplectanidae
- Genus: Pseudomurraytrematoides; Domingues & Boeger, 2008
- Species: P. pricei

Binomial name
- Pseudomurraytrematoides pricei (Caballero, Bravo-Hollis & Grocott, 1955) Domingues & Boeger, 2008

Genus of worms

Pseudomurraytrematoides is a genus of monopisthocotylean monogeneans, belonging to the family Diplectanidae.

== Species ==
According to the World Register of Marine Species, there is a single species in the genus:

- Pseudomurraytrematoides pricei (Caballero, Bravo-Hollis & Grocott, 1955) Domingues & Boeger, 2008

Pseudomurraytrematoides pricei is a parasite of the Red pike conger Cynoponticus coniceps (Muraenesocidae) off the Pacific coast of Panama.
