= Bothitrematidae =

Scientific classification
- Kingdom: Animalia
- Phylum: Platyhelminthes
- Class: Monogenea
- Order: Gyrodactylidea
- Family: Bothitrematidae; Price, 1936

Family of flatworms

Bothitrematidae is a family of flatworms belonging to the order Gyrodactylidea.

Genera:

- Bothitrema Price, 1936
