= Tetraonchoididae =

Scientific classification
- Kingdom: Animalia
- Phylum: Platyhelminthes
- Class: Monogenea
- Order: Gyrodactylidea
- Family: Tetraonchoididae; Bychowsky, 1951

Family of flatworms

Tetraonchoididae is a family of flatworms belonging to the order Gyrodactylidea.

Genera:

- Allotetraonchoides Dillon & Hargis, 1968
- Heteropavlovskioides Machida, 1978
- Neopavlovskioides Dillon & Hargis, 1968
- Paratetraonchoides Bychowsky, Gussev & Nagibina, 1965
- Pavlovskioides Bychowsky, Gussev & Nagibina, 1965
- Pseudotetraonchoides Bychowsky, Gussev & Nagibina, 1965
- Tetraonchoides Bychowsky, 1951
