= Rhamnocercus =

Scientific classification
- Kingdom: Animalia
- Phylum: Platyhelminthes
- Class: Monogenea
- Order: Dactylogyridea
- Family: Diplectanidae
- Genus: Rhamnocercus; Monaco, Wood & Mizelle, 1954

Type species
- Rhamnocercus rhamnocercus Monaco, Wood & Mizelle, 1954

Species
- See text

Genus of worms

Rhamnocercus is a genus of monopisthocotylean monogeneans in the family Diplectanidae. All species of Rhamnocercus are parasites of marine perciform fishes of the family Sciaenidae.

== Species ==
According to the World Register of Marine Species, the following species are included in the genus:

- Rhamnocercus bairdiella Hargis, 1955
- Rhamnocercus margaritae Fuentes-Zambrano, 1997
- Rhamnocercus oliveri Luque & Iannacone, 1991
- Rhamnocercus rhamnocercus Monaco, Wood & Mizelle, 1954 (Type-species)
- Rhamnocercus stelliferi Luque & Iannacone, 1991
