= Entobdella soleae =

Scientific classification
- Kingdom: Animalia
- Phylum: Platyhelminthes
- Class: Monogenea
- Order: Capsalidea
- Family: Capsalidae
- Genus: Entobdella
- Species: E. soleae

Binomial name
- Entobdella soleae Van Beneden & Hesse, 1864

Species of flatworm

Entobdella soleae is a monogenean (Platyhelminth) skin parasite of the common sole, Solea solea, an important food fish. They are approximately 2 to 6 mm in length. It is flat, translucent, and has a large, disc-shaped haptor, a posterior organ used for semi-permanent attachment to the host. Typically, 2-6 parasites are found on wild sole, but in intensive fish farms this can rise to 200-300 parasites per fish, causing skin inflammation and sometimes death of the sole. E. soleae can live up to 120 days in seawater.

== Life cycle ==
The life cycle of Entobdella soleae follows the life patterns of their marine bottom-living host. The Solea solea would bury itself in the sediment for some time each day. The parasites are attached to the bottom of their host, in which when their hosts bury themselves, the parasite lays their eggs. The eggs are anchored to the sea bottom so that they wouldn't be swept away by the water currents. When the eggs hatched the oncomiracidia emerges and invades the anterior part of the upper surface of the fish. This part of the fish is the only part that is exposed when the fish is buried. After entering and developing on the upper surface of the fish, it migrates down toward the lower surface of the fish where they reach sexual maturity. Adult parasite would distribute throughout the lower surface of the host and are oriented with the adhesive organ upstream.

== Larvae ==
Entobdella soleae larvae are called oncomiracidia. They are free-swimming and ciliated. These oncomiracidia are likely to attach to the host's upper surface where they migrate forwards toward the fish's head and then migrate to the underside of the sole, where they remain.

== Attachment and detachment ==
Entobdella soleae utilizes suction through a posterior disc-shaped haptor to achieve semi-permanent attachment to the sole's skin. E. soleae demonstrate host-specific behavior by attaching to the sole epidermis by the presence of sole mucous cells.

The characteristic of the pad tegument might demonstrate a possible role in detachment of the parasite to the host. These features include an isolated tegument and the microvillus surface network of the pad tegument.

== Adhesive pad ==
The surface of the adhesive pads of E. soleae is encompassed by tegument that contains perforations of numerous rod-carrying ducts through pepper-pot apertures and ducts of spheroidal secretory bodies. Rods are distributed uniformly and intensely electron-dense within their ducts. Spheroidal secretory bodies are both tightly packed and have less electron density than rods. Moreover, the tegument on the surface of the parasite is isolated from the general tegumentary syncytium by a cell boundary. The tegument also contains secretory bodies.

A 4-5 μm layer of cement bonds the adhesive pad of E. soleae via tegumental microvilli and the sole's epidermal furrows during attachment. Rod-shaped secretory bodies are the major substance of the cement.

== Locomotion ==
During locomotion on the skin of the sole, the anterior region of E. soleae temporarily attaches to the skin via two pads through an adhesive secretion. These adhesive pads contain two glandular secretions packaged in rods and spheroidal bodies. The locomotion step of E. soleae on the skin sole starts through elongation of the body with the haptor attached. Before attachment of the adhesive pads to the sole's skin, liquid spheroidal bodies quickly spread across the surface of the adhesive pads and bundles of rod-like secretory bodies leave the pepper-pot apertures of rod-carrying ducts. The synergy of both secretions produces the cement that binds the parasite to the host.

The post-larval migration of E. soleae on the host’s surface ranges from 10–40 days; maintenance of navigational signals must remain intact over the entire period of migration.

During migration, E. soleae larva utilizes the physical features of the host's scales as guidance for movement towards the head. The haptor attaches to the host’s scales as a lock and key mechanism where the axis of the haptor aligns with the longitudinal axis of the sole towards the head.

== Egg ==
Adult E. soleae lays tetrahedral eggs that have a tanned protein shell. A detachable operculum constitutes one of the tetrahedron corners of the egg. The cap-like operculum is bonded to the rest of the egg-shell by a thin cement layer. The opercular bond is strong, and operculum detachment only occurs through the actions of oncomiracidium and the secretion of hatching fluid by glands from the head region. The oncomiracidium of E. soleae escapes through an aperture of the operculum during hatching.

The eggshell of E. soleae has a similar structural appearance to those of Fasciola hepatica, but without a membrane on the egg-shell lining. The egg's shell is produced by integration of shell material droplets from vitelline cells. Hatching occurs via chemical removal of the opercular cement and physical rupture of the rest of the egg-shell and opercular bond.

Egg hatching of E. soleae induces a releaser response where the larva swims up and down the water column in the ocean to find the sole host.

=== Hatching strategies ===
E. soleae consist of two hatching strategies: quick hatching in the presence of sole skin mucus and spontaneous hatching in the absence of the host. During the natural cycle of illumination, egg hatching is rhythmical: most larvae emerge a few hours after dawn. When fully developed eggs are in contact with sole body mucus during the illumination cycle, hatching is enhanced. The enhanced egg hatching indicates that the sole body mucus contains a potent hatching stimulant.
