= Cylindrotaenia =

Scientific classification
- Missing taxonomy template (fix): Cylindrotaenia

Synonyms
- Baerietta Hsü, 1935

Genus of flatworms

Cylindrotaenia is a genus of tapeworms for frogs.

== Species ==
There are twelve species assigned to this genus:

- Cylindrotaenia allisonae (Schmidt, 1980) Jones, 1987
- Cylindrotaenia americana Jewell, 1916
- Cylindrotaenia criniae (Hickman, 1960) Jones, 1987
- Cylindrotaenia decidua (Ainsworth, 1985) Jones, 1987
- Cylindrotaenia hickmani (Jones, 1985) Jones, 1987
- Cylindrotaenia idahoensis (Waitz & Mehra, 1961) Jones, 1987
- Cylindrotaenia jaegerskioeldi (Janicki, 1926) Jones, 1987
- Cylindrotaenia japonica (Yamaguti, 1938) Jones, 1987
- Cylindrotaenia magna Jones, 1987
- Cylindrotaenia minor (Hickman, 1960) Jones, 1987
- Cylindrotaenia montana (Yamaguti, 1954) Jones, 1987
- Cylindrotaenia philauti Crusz & Sanmugasunderam, 1971
