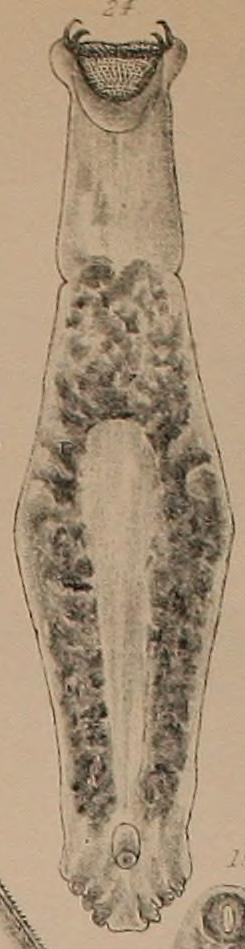
- Illustration of Diplectanum aequans

Scientific classification
- Kingdom: Animalia
- Phylum: Platyhelminthes
- Class: Monogenea
- Order: Dactylogyridea
- Family: Diplectanidae
- Genus: Diplectanum; Diesing, 1858

= Diplectanum =

Genus of worms

Diplectanum is a genus of monopisthocotylean monogeneans in the family Diplectanidae. The genus, created by Karl Moriz Diesing, gave its name to the family Diplectanidae. All its species are parasites of the gill lamellae of teleosts. The type-species of the genus is Diplectanum aequans (Wagener, 1857).

== Species ==
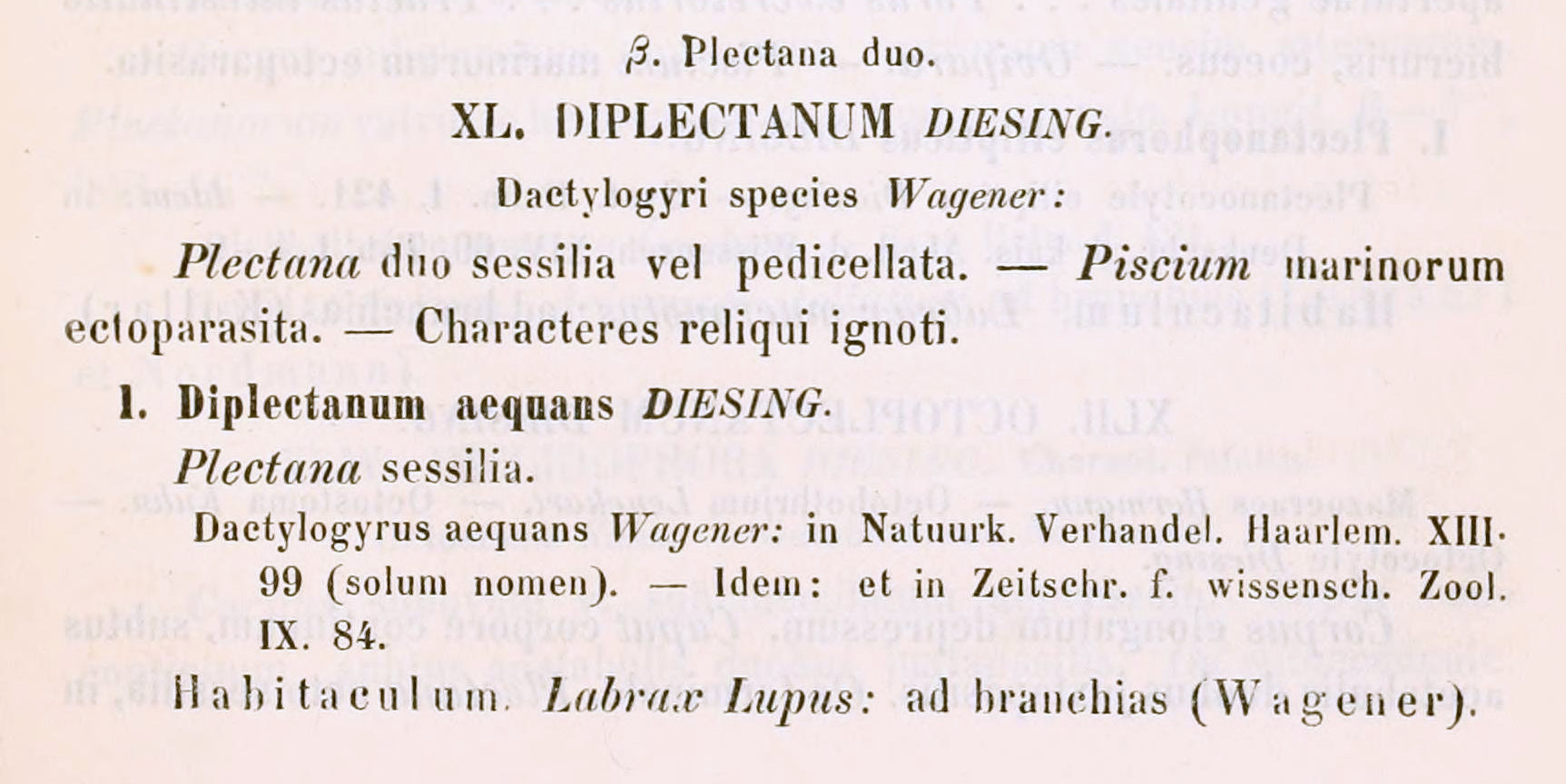
Extract of Karl Moriz Diesing (1858) Revision der Myzhelminthen - with first mention of Diplectanum and Diplectanum aequans. Text in Latin

According to the World Register of Marine Species, many species are included in this genus. Examples are:

- Diplectanum aculeatum Parona & Perugia, 1889
- Diplectanum aequans (Wagener, 1857)
- Diplectanum banyulense Oliver, 1968
- Diplectanum belengeri (Chauhan, 1945) Chauhan, 1954
- Diplectanum bocqueti Oliver, 1980
- Diplectanum chabaudi Oliver, 1980
- Diplectanum copiosum Boeger, Fehlauer & Marques, 2006
- Diplectanum dollfusi Oliver, 1980
- Diplectanum femineum Justine & Henry, 2010
- Diplectanum flagritubus Nagibina, 1976
