= Oscar Werner Tiegs =

Australian zoologist (1897–1956)

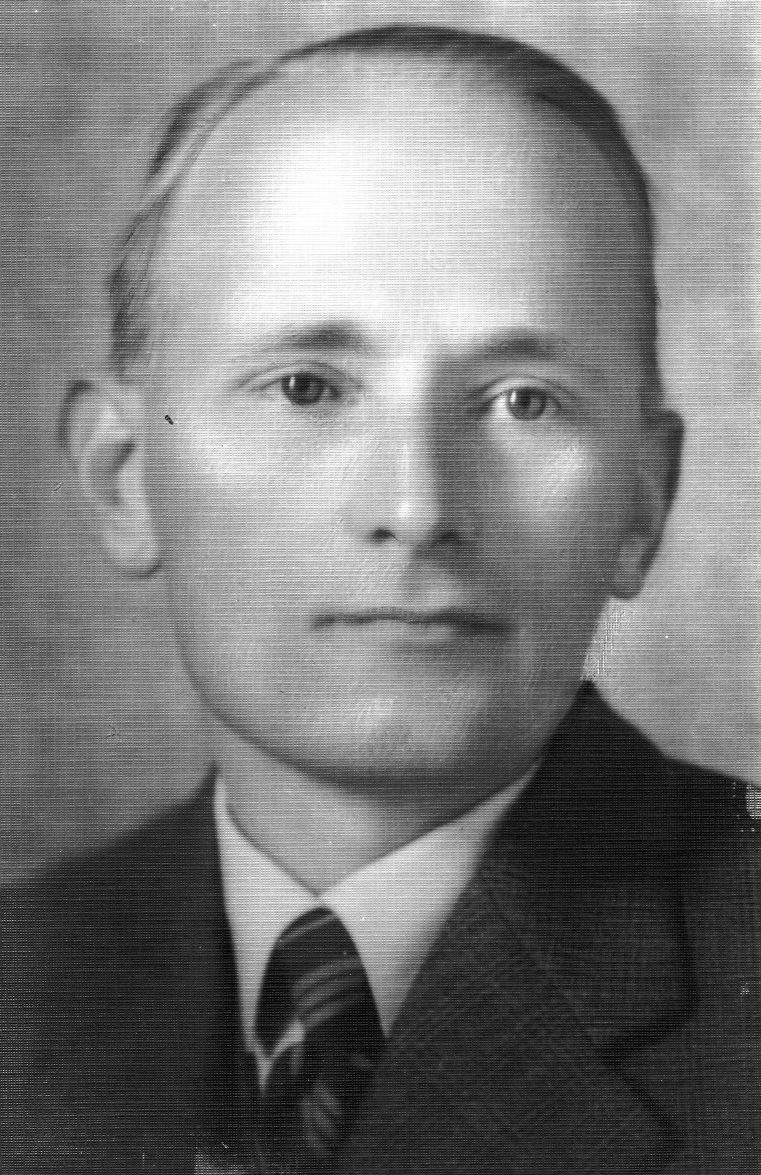
- Born: 12 March 1897; Kangaroo Point, Brisbane, Australia
- Died: 5 November 1956 (aged 59); Hawthorn, Melbourne, Australia
- Known for: Contributions to the phylogenetic division of arthropoda
- Awards: David Syme Research Prize (1928); Clarke Medal (zoology) (1956); Fellow of the Royal Society (1944); Fellow of the Australian Academy of Science (1954)
- Scientific career
- Institutions: University of Adelaide; University of Melbourne

Oscar Werner Tiegs FRS FAA (12 March 1897 – 5 November 1956) was an Australian zoologist whose career spanned the first half of the 20th century.

His contribution to the division of the phylum arthropoda into two parts, one including insects, myriapods, and velvet worms, and the other including trilobites, crustaceans, and arachnids, is considered to be an important contribution to zoology. He was known for his ability to illustrate animals to great detail and obsession with microscopic observation of invertebrates. He is considered one of Australia's great zoologists and as having a permanent place in the history of zoology.

He was a Doctor of Science (University of Adelaide), a Fellow of the Royal Society, and a founding Fellow of the Australian Academy of Science.

== Early life and education ==
Oscar Tiegs' father, Prussian born Otto Theodor Carl Tiegs, and mother, Helene Caroline Ottilie, née Meyer, from Hanover, migrated to Australia from Germany. The Royal Society states that Otto Tiegs had careers in both pharmacy and engineering, and had a high regard for learning, while others state that he was a merchant. In particular, in 1920 under oath, Otto Tiegs described himself as a merchant.

Oscar Tiegs was born at Kangaroo Point, a suburb of Brisbane. He had four younger sisters, two of whom died as infants.

As a child, he was fascinated by insects and put together a collection of about one thousand named beetles, which was eventually taken in by the Queensland Museum. He described himself as a timid but industrious boy with an absorbing interest in insects, and acknowledged the support of the Queensland Government entomologist, Henry Tyson.

He attended Brisbane State School until the age of 14, and Brisbane Grammar School from 1911 to 1915. He was awarded a scholarship to attend university.

=== University of Queensland ===
Commencing in March 1916 at the University of Queensland he studied science, specialising in biology under Thomas Harvey Johnston, where he received training in animal morphology. He was awarded his Bachelor of Science in 1919. (Note: 1919-05-02, 1st class honours) (Note: Bachelor of Science Certificate, University of Queensland; Basser Library, Australian Academy of Science, Manuscript Collection, MS076/76/3/1) During his honours course, he produced his first research paper in 1918: an anatomical study of the echiuroid worm (pseudobonelia). He received his Master of Science in 1921, (Note: 1921-04-29) (Note: Master of Science Certificate, University of Queensland; Basser Library, Australian Academy of Science, Manuscript Collection, MS076/76/3/1) at the age of 25. He wanted to study medicine, but there was no medical school in Queensland, so instead continued into zoology.

In 1920 (Note: 1920-04-01) (Note: Letter from University of Queensland Registrar to Oscar Werner Tiegs dated 1920-04-08; Basser Library, Australian Academy of Science, Manuscript Collection, MS076/76/1/5) he was the beneficiary of a Walter and Eliza Hall Fellowship (Note: Oscar Tiegs held the Fellowship for two years and was paid 400 pounds per annum) in economic biology. He worked with scientists researching the control of the blowfly and prickly pear in Queensland, and was involved in the campaign to eradicate hookworm.

Tiegs was the first graduate of the University of Queensland to be awarded the degree of doctor of science.

== Adult life ==
Ethel Mary Tiegs, 1927.

On 14 August 1926, Oscar Tiegs married Ethel Mary Hamilton, a telephonist, at the Presbyterian Church in the Melbourne suburb of Hawthorn.

Tiegs was known to form lasting friendships, even from relatively brief associations. For example, colleagues he met only once while on a trip to Europe in 1928, had fond memories of him. He was known as Sandy Tiegs to his friends and colleagues.

He was godfather to David, the son of his mentor and colleague, Professor Brailsford Robertson.

Tiegs was always interested in learning and research, and was known to find administration and committee work distasteful. This would appear to be at odds with his being a Councillor, and Chair of the Library Committee, for The Royal Society of Victoria.

As head of the Melbourne University's Department of Zoology, he encouraged research and empowered his staff to set their own courses of activity with a directed freedom that nurtured world class research. He tended not to be interested in the research of others unless it was closely aligned with his own, yet was proud of his staff and was keen to show visitors what his staff were doing.

He lectured without notes, mainly to first year students, to whom he gave a solid background in elementary zoology and comparative morphology, in a manner which was considered a model of presentation and clarity. He gave special lectures on arthropod evolution and the vertebrate nervous system to senior students. However, Oscar Tiegs' involvement in imparting knowledge started much earlier than his time at the University of Melbourne, he being a student demonstrator (Note: Oscar Tiegs was paid 5 shillings per hour to a maximum of 60 pounds for the year.) (Note: Letter from University of Queensland Registrar to Oscar Werner Tiegs dated 1918-03-26; Basser Library, Australian Academy of Science, Manuscript Collection, MS076/76/1/5) in biology at the University of Queensland in 1918.

Oscar Werner Tiegs circa 1950s.

Tiegs was elected in 1944 as a Fellow of the Royal Society, aged 47.

In 1954 Oscar Tiegs was one of 23 Foundation Fellows of the Australian Academy of Science, and along with the other 22 foundation fellows was a petitioner to Queen Elizabeth II for the Academy's charter. He, Sydney Sunderland, and Thomas MacFarland Cherry, two other petitioners and foundation members were responsible for drafting the by-laws of the newly formed Academy.

The Melbourne University's zoological museum, now called the Tiegs Museum, owes much of the quality of its collection to Oscar Tiegs. He spent time and care improving and extending its holdings, based on his belief in the traditional morphological approach to zoology.

Oscar Tiegs was a prodigious worker, and, for example, would take on extra lecturing duties during staff absences to not load his other staff, and only in later years did he balance his time more out of work. He was fond of music, in particular Beethoven and Mozart, and critically appreciated pictures. These interests, of music, art, and literature he shared with his wife Ethel.

Some felt Oscar Tiegs, while honest, was direct to the point of bluntness, and had a keen sense of humour. He was known for supportive letters sent to friends during World War II, and the gift parcels sent by him and his wife. Oscar Tiegs' geographical isolation, and his own diffidence probably prevented him from maximising his contribution to zoology, although rather than diffidence others describe it as an unassuming disposition. He is described as shy and reserved, preferring the laboratory to the committee meeting or social function.

He suffered from aortic stenosis, and died of a coronary occlusion in his home in Hawthorn, aged 59.

== Career ==
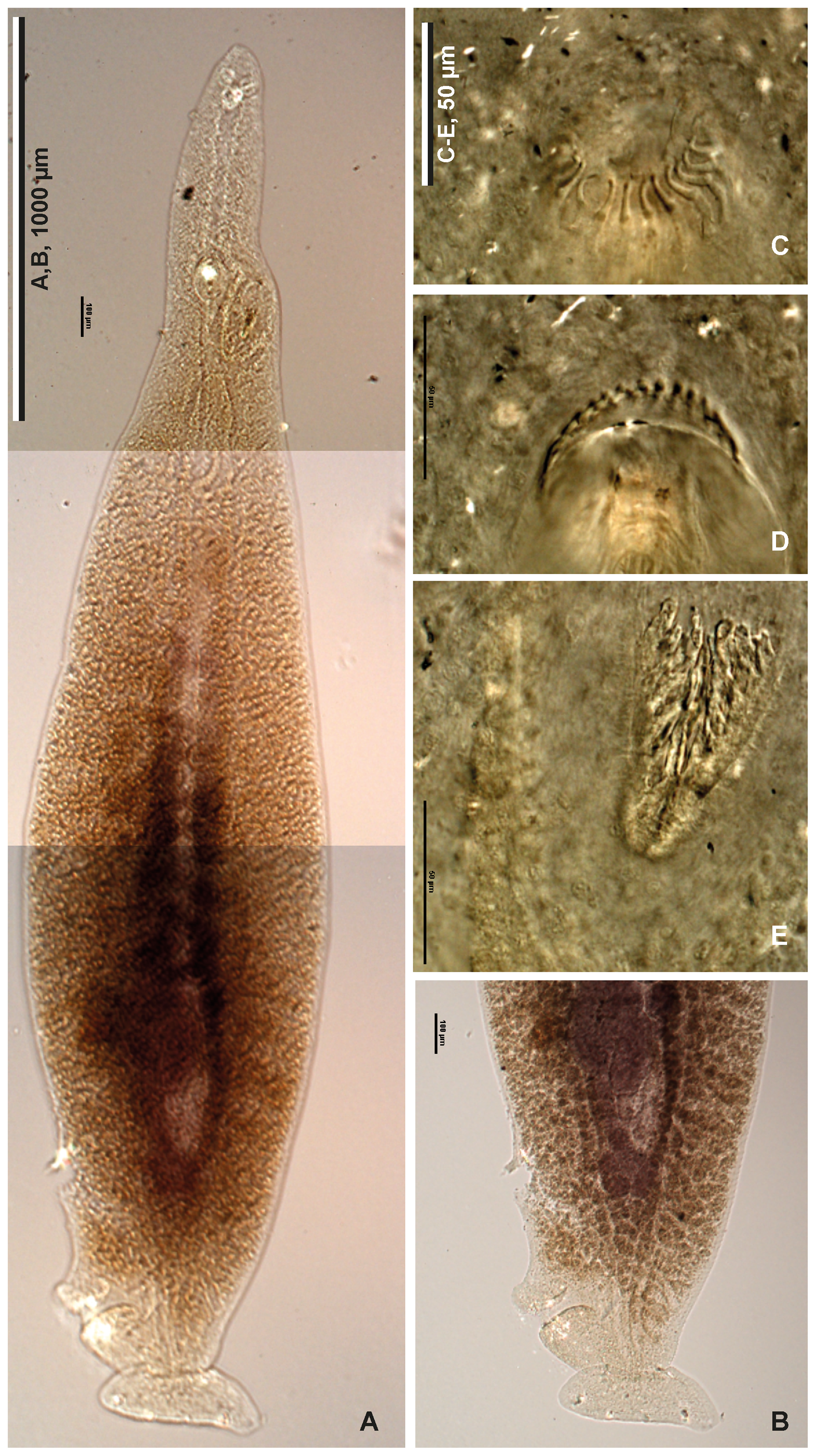
Helminthological investigations: A worm of the family Protomicrocotylidae, a family created by Johnston and Tiegs in 1922

Oscar Tiegs' scientific interests and contributions ranged from the physiological analysis of nervous and muscular action to invertebrate embryology, his studies being comparable to the very best work the last century. He repeatedly turned from one area of research to another, only to return again. He was a dedicated practiser of descriptive morphology during a period when the majority of biologists were turning to experimentation.

Typically, even his first research paper, was to describe something unusually interesting, namely that the male of the echiuroid worm exhibits a greater degree of degeneration than other species, the tissues fusing with those of its female partner and the host.

He briefly made some helminthological investigations, for example with hookworm, and monogeneans before moving to the newly created Department of Zoology at the University of Adelaide in 1922.

=== University of Adelaide ===
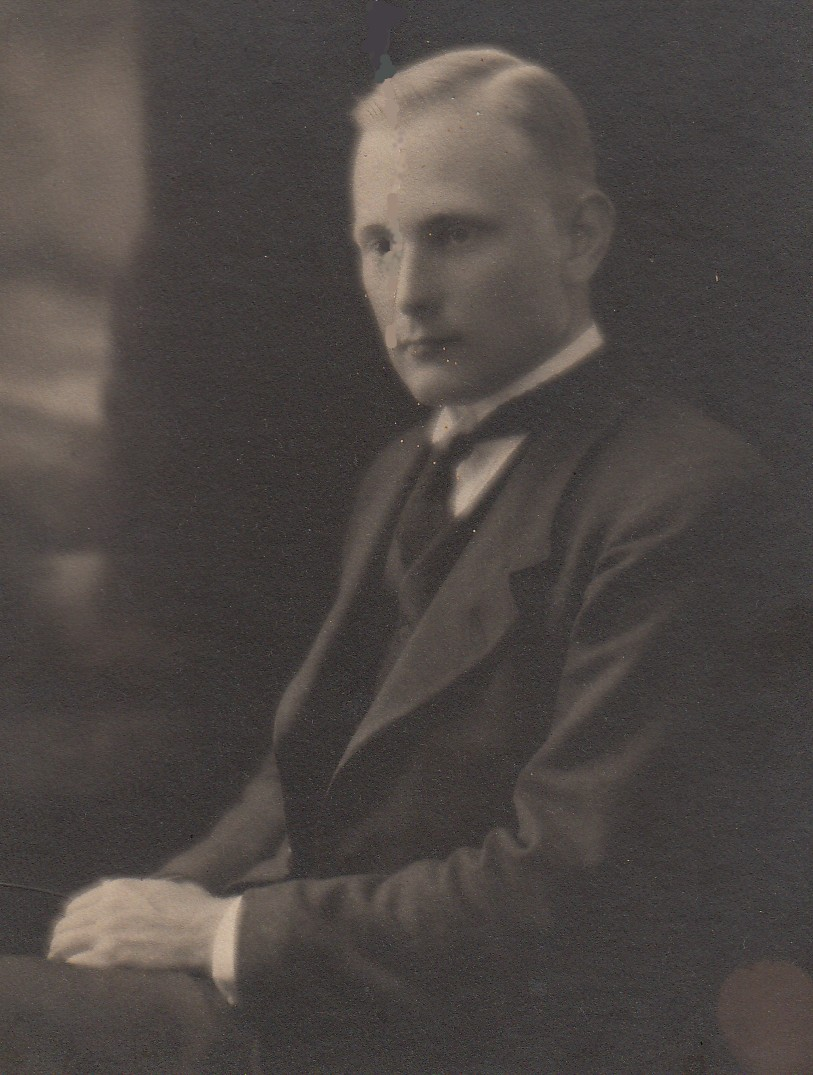
Oscar Werner Tiegs while in Adelaide.

At Adelaide, because of the absence of Professor Johnston, he was appointed Acting Chair of Zoology, (Note: Oscar Tiegs was paid 550 pounds per annum) (Note: Letter from Registrar of the University of Adelaide to Oscar Werner Tiegs dated 1921-09-13; Basser Library, Australian Academy of Science, Manuscript Collection, MS076/76/1/5) as acting head of the department he organised the new department and its teaching. Here he was influenced by Wood Jones, Professor of Anatomy, and the physiologist Professor Brailsford Robertson, one of the pupils of Jacques Loeb. Oscar Tiegs spent three years at Adelaide, during which time he was granted a Bachelor of Science degree in 1922 (Note: 1922-04-04) (Note: Bachelor of Science Certificate, University of Adelaide; Basser Library, Australian Academy of Science, Manuscript Collection, MS076/76/3/1) and obtained his Doctorate of Science degree in 1922 (Note: 1922-12-13) (Note: Doctor of Science Certificate, University of Adelaide; Basser Library, Australian Academy of Science, Manuscript Collection, MS076/76/3/1) both from the University of Adelaide, at the age of 25, his thesis being on the histology of metamorphosis of a pteromalid wasp (Nasonia), specifically Nasonia brevicornis (now designated Nasonia vitripennis).

Oscar Tiegs' doctoral thesis work was to be the basis for much of his later work, in embryological studies, and the study of fine structures in muscle. He found clear evidence that the apparent striation of muscle fibres did not arise from separate disks, but from a helicoidal organisation within the fibre. He also found a similar condition in vertebrate muscles. Later he discovered that former histologists had recorded the same thing, but their observations had received little attention. He contended that helicoidal striation is a general feature of muscles and that muscular conduction takes place along this helicoidal path, even though the evidence for this generality was against him, yet his cinematographic records supported his interpretation for arachnids and other arthropods.

Between 1922 and 1934 Oscar Tiegs was almost entirely concerned with the physiology of nerve and muscle, apparently influenced by Brailsford Robertson.

In 1925 he published the results of experiments regarding the importance of creatine. This line of research was inspired by the lactic acid hypotheses of muscular action at the time and before phosphagen was discovered.

=== University of Melbourne ===
During 1925 Oscar Tiegs moved to Melbourne University's department of Zoology as a senior lecturer, then headed by Professor Wilfred Eade Agar.

Syme Medal
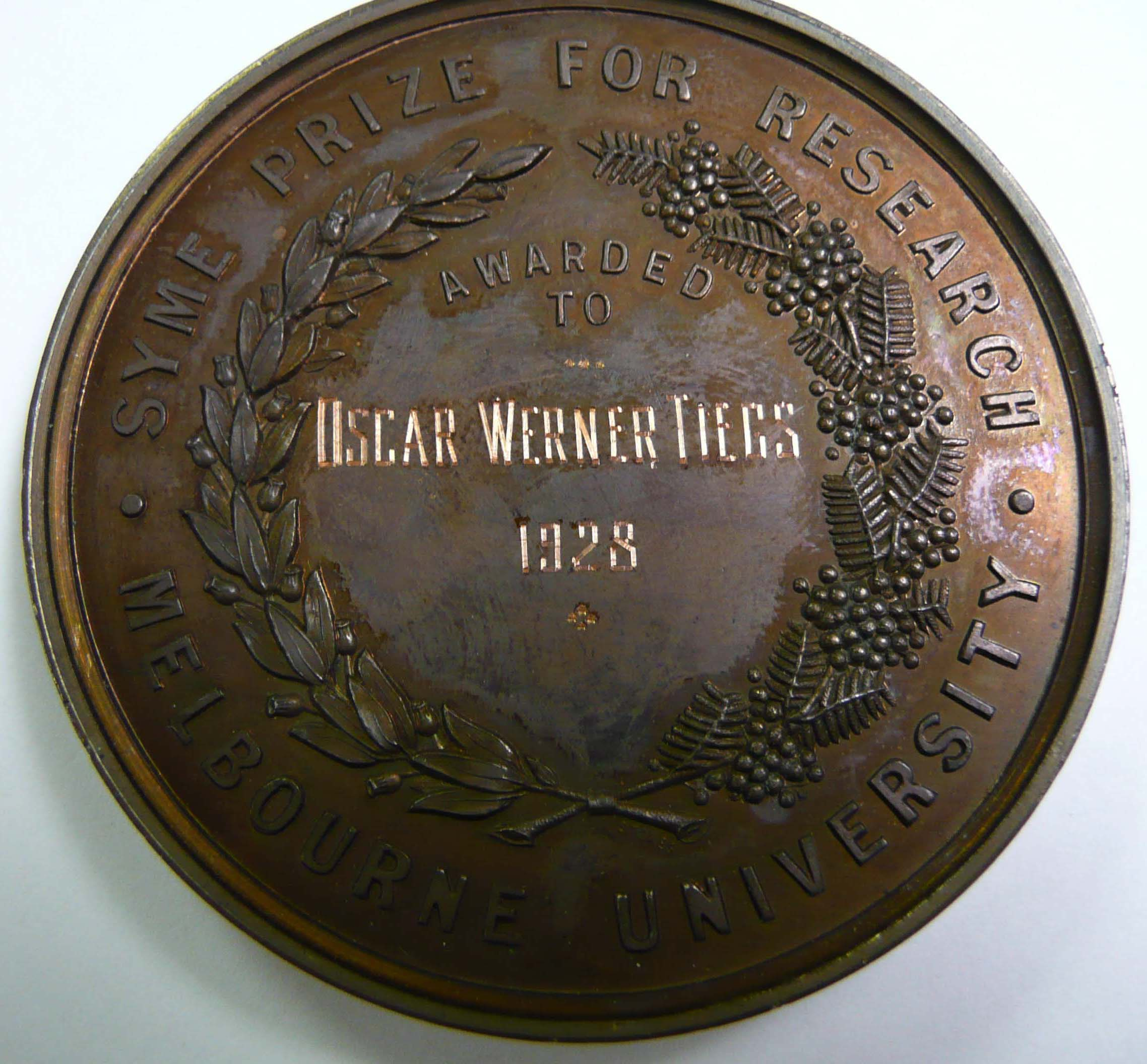

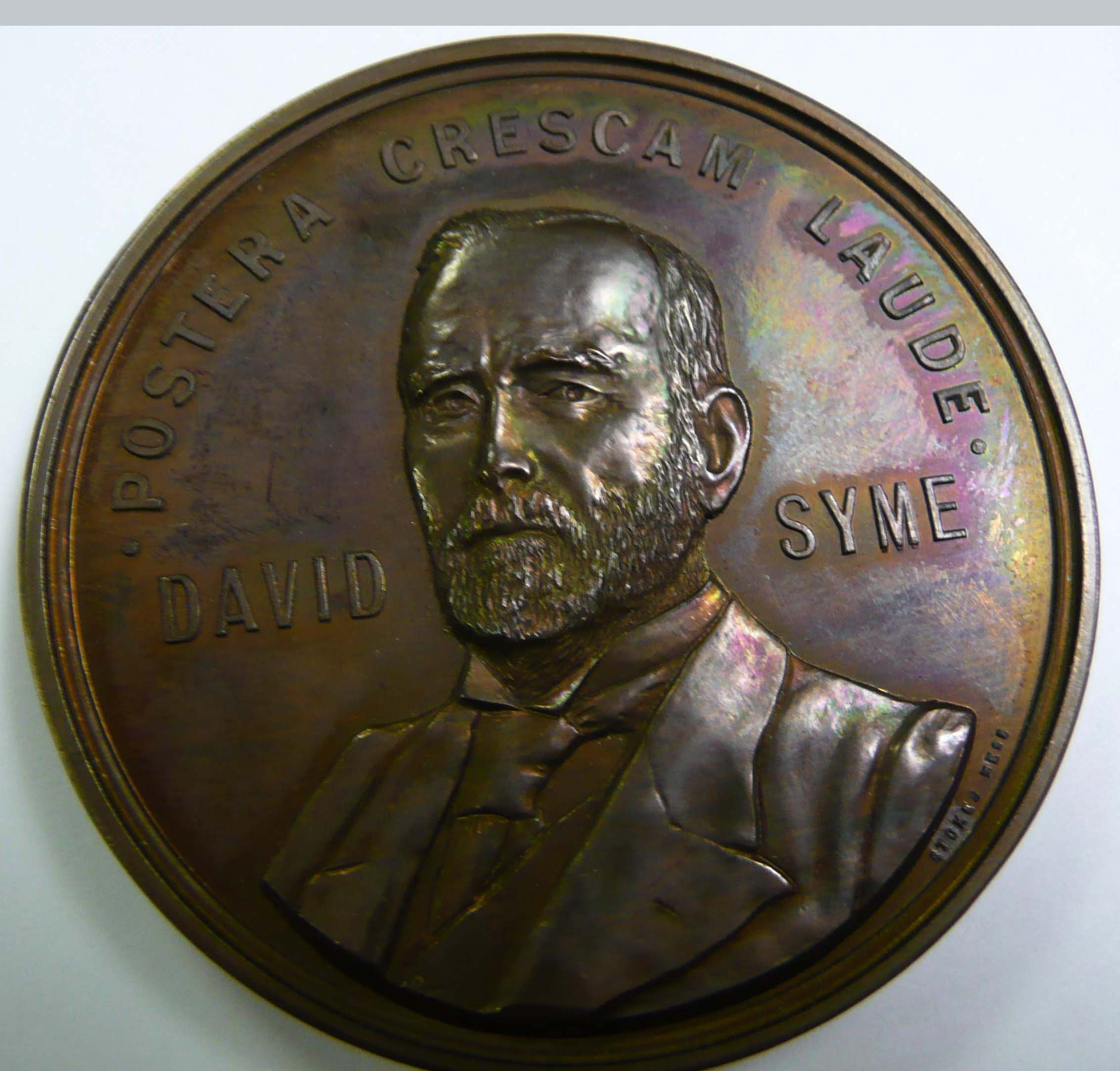
reverse

In 1928 he obtained a Rockefeller Travelling Fellowship to visit Europe, where he worked for a while in the Anatomical School at Cambridge University, England, then headed by Professor Wilson, and in the Anatomical School at Utrecht University, the Netherlands, then headed by Professor Boecke.

Also in 1928, Oscar Tiegs was awarded the David Syme Research Prize.

As a histologist Oscar Tiegs developed an interest in Boecke's suggestion of a double innervation of vertebrate skeletal muscle. From this interest he undertook a physiological investigation of the sympathetic system in the muscle, finding no such action except in blood vessels, all muscular action seemingly being caused by an adrenaline-like substance.

Oscar Tiegs in this work corrected errors and ambiguities in the work of others, and showed the validity of some traditional interpretations.

==== Lamarckian inheritance ====
Similarly, his experiments with Wilfred Eade Agar to test William McDougall's supposed demonstration of Lamarckian inheritance of training in rats were negative and showed the inadequacy of McDougall's controls, the first results being published in 1935.

==== Phylogenetics of arthropoda ====
In 1933 (Note: 1933-04-08) (Note: Master of Science Certificate, University of Melbourne; Basser Library, Australian Academy of Science, Manuscript Collection, MS076/76/3/1) Oscar Tiegs was granted a Master of Science degree from the University of Melbourne, and according to the Royal Society became Associate Professor of Zoology at Melbourne University, whereas according to the Australian Academy of Science and others this appointment occurred in 1931, (Note: Oscar Tiegs' appointment was effective 1931-03-01 and was paid 600 pounds per annum) (Note: Letter from University of Melbourne Registrar to Oscar Werner Tiegs dated 1931-07-1931; Basser Library, Australian Academy of Science, Manuscript Collection, MS076/76/1/5) in particular the University of Melbourne, for recognition of the value of his researches, (Note: Actual wording in the letter is 'in special recognition of work in the University of Melbourne'.) and his interests returned to insect metamorphosis. He followed the development of three species, the beetle calandra, the symphylan hansenialla, and pauropus. He found the concept of rejuvenation to be invalid. He showed the impossibility of reconciling midgut development with a normal gastrulation process. Building on this work he undertook a four-year investigation of the embryology of the symphylan Hanseniella agilis, followed by a three study of the embryology of pauropus silvaticus. He showed contrary to expectation that the progoneate genital ducts did not arise as is usual from coelomoducts in the embryo, but secondarily as epidermal ingrowths late in larval life, the progoneate form was merely a secondary adaptation to the anamorphic mode of growth of some myriapods by which new segments become added to the posterior end of the growing larva.

Oscar Tiegs thus showed that the characteristic of being opisthogoneate, that is with posterior genital openings, and the characteristic of progoneate, that is with the genital opening differently placed, anteriorly, are not dichotomous, and thus reduced the significance of the until then corresponding major classificatory zoological division. He proposed a new classification scheme based on head structure, this being supported by later work by others regarding antennal muscles, and locomotive behaviour and machinery in the relevant animals.

At the time of his death in 1956, Oscar Tiegs left a full draft of a review on the evolution of arthropoda. Its final preparation and publication was undertaken by friends and colleagues. Oscar Tiegs typically also known for this work.

==== Further major work and recognition ====
The Royal Society elected Oscar Tiegs as a fellow in 1944 (Note: 1944-03-17) (Note: Membership of the Royal Society, Royal Society, Basser Library, Australian Academy of Science, Manuscript Collection, MS076/76/3/1) for:

1. his work on insect embryology and metamorphosis, and the embryology of Symphyla;
2. his experimental studies on the innervation of skeletal muscle and the functional relation of the sympathetic system to muscle (Orbeli effect);
3. his histological work on muscle, especially the helicoidal structure of the striated muscle fibre;
4. and other research concerning: histology of the neurosynapse; innervation of teeth; chemical transmission at dorsal root nerve endings.

He was appointed to a Chair of Zoology at the University of Melbourne in 1948 (Note: 1948-03-01. Oscar Tiegs was paid 1,500 pounds per annum) (Note: Letter from University of Melbourne Registrar to OScar Werner Tiegs dated 1947-06-16; Basser Library, Australian Academy of Science, Manuscript Collection, MS076/76/1/5) which he held until his death, and became a full Professor in 1948.

Oscar Tiegs served as Dean of the Faculty of Science the University of Melbourne from 1950 to 1952.

In 1951 Professor Wilfred Agar died and Oscar Tiegs became Professor and took over as head of the Melbourne University Zoological Department.

Others state that Oscar Tiegs took the Chair of Zoology at the University of Melbourne in 1948 upon the retirement of Professor Wilfred Agar.

In 1954 he took sabbatical leave and travelled overseas a second time supported by a British Council travel grant. This second trip provided Oscar Tiegs with the opportunity to be formally admitted to the Royal Society, after being elected as a Fellow 10 years earlier. While in England he also chaired a session of the Sixth Commonwealth Entomological Conference. (Note: 1954-07-15. Session on ????) (Note: Letter from Director, Commonwealth Institute of Entomology to Oscar Werner Tiegs dated 1954-03-26; Basser Library, Australian Academy of Science, Manuscript Collection, MS076/76) He also delivered a series of three lectures on the flight muscles of insects at the University of London during March 1954

Clarke Medal
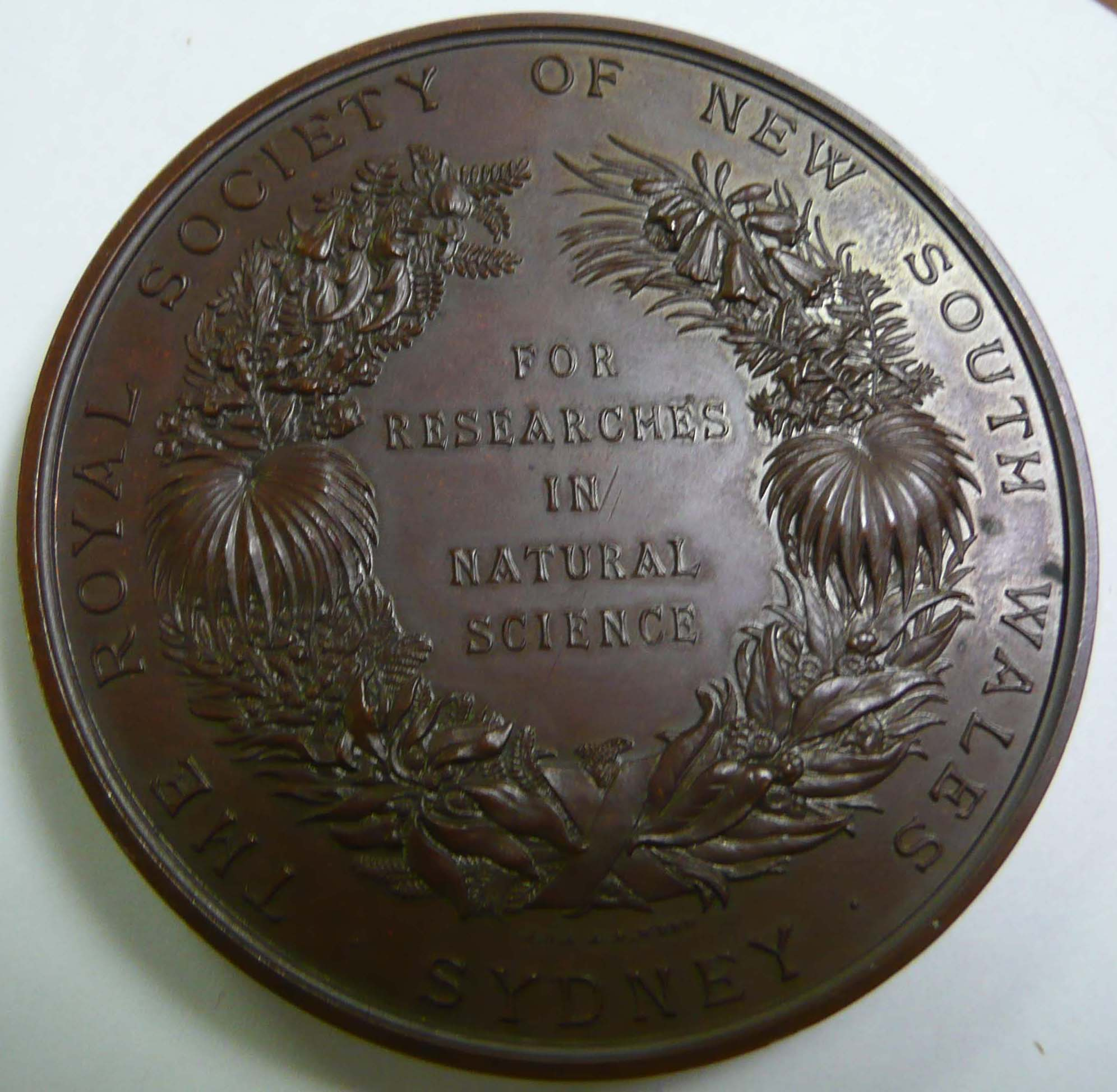

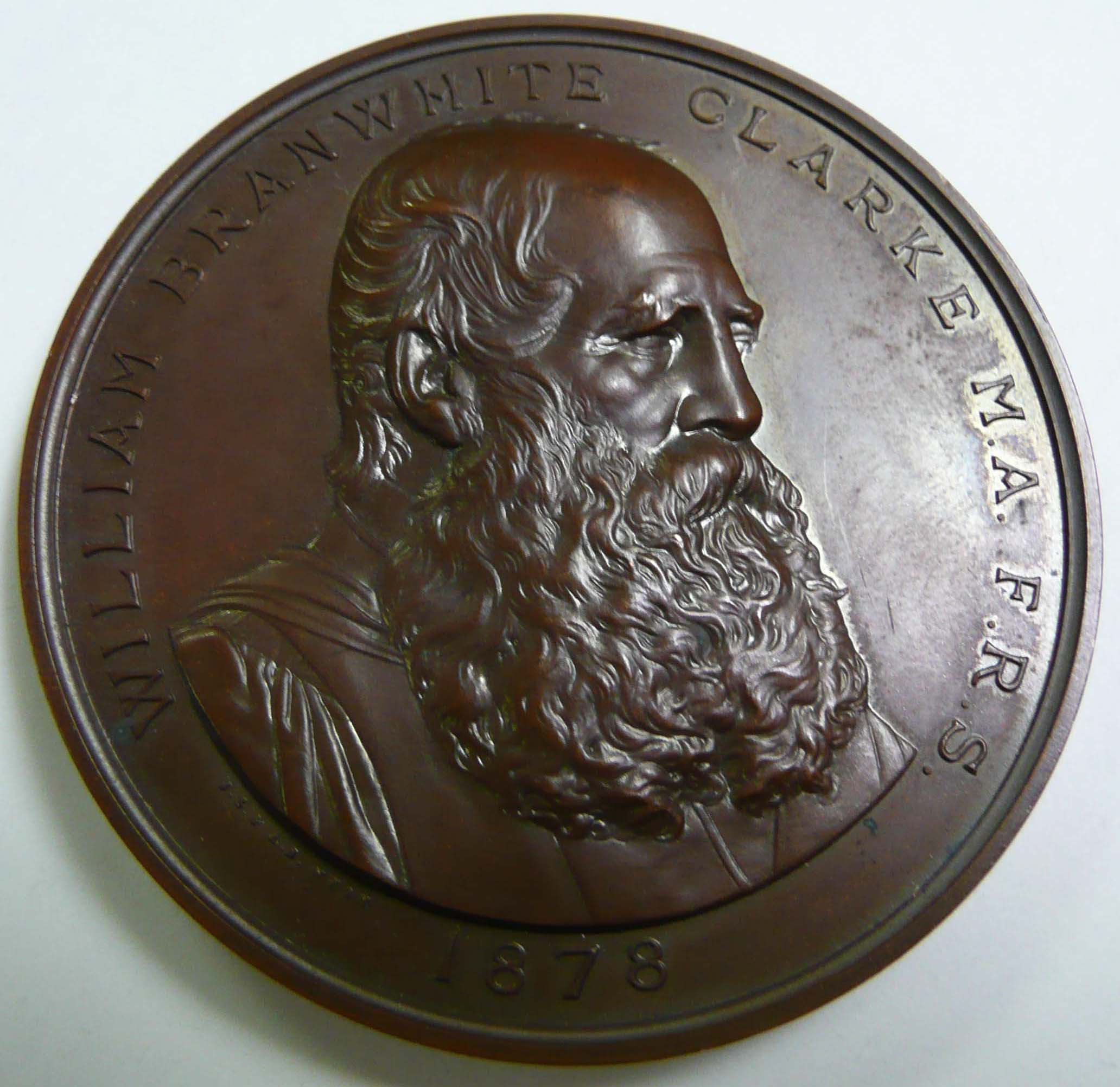
Reverse

Oscar Tiegs returned to his area of doctoral studies for what was to be his last research, an exhaustive study of the flight muscles of insects and other arthropod muscles published in 1955. This analysis of the comparative myology and evolution of wide range of insect's flight muscles showed how such muscles evolved structurally at a histological level. He showed that the histogenesis of muscle in orthoptera (butterflies, moths, etc.) and simpler insects by the repeated division of rudimentary muscle fibres, but in higher orders of insect, free individual myoblasts applicate to young muscle fibres laying down a new fibril, contributing sarcoplasm and nuclei.

In 1956 Oscar Tiegs was awarded the Clarke Medal by the Royal Society of New South Wales, although the Australian Academy of Science has him listed, incorrectly, as receiving this award in 1928.

== Memoria ==
=== Tiegs Museum ===
The University of Melbourne's zoological museum, established in 1887, is now named The Tiegs Museum after Oscar Tiegs. Oscar Tiegs was responsible for substantially improving the museum's collection, which was housed in its own room in the old Zoology Building. The room was called "The Tiegs Museum" and this title was now officially adopted, and followed the museum to its new location in the Zoology Department's new premises in 1988.

=== Tiegs Place ===
Canberra, the national capital of Australia, names its streets after nationally significant people, places, and events. Tiegs Place, a street in the suburb of Florey in Canberra, is named after Oscar Tiegs, notably for:

Biologist; Walter and Eliza Hall Fellow in Economic Biology, 1920; on staff, Zoology Department, Queensland University; Lecturer, Melbourne University, 1925; David Syme Research Prize and Rockefeller Travelling Fellow, 1948; Fellow, Academy of Science; President, Section D meeting, ANZAAS, 1949; Dean of Faculty of Science, 1950–52; important research on insect metamorphosis; published numerous papers and articles.

=== Kangaroo Point Natural History Project ===
Included along a heritage trail through the CT White and James Warner parks at Kangaroo Point, Brisbane, Queensland, are interpretive signs which commemorate the life and work of Oscar Tiegs as one of the pioneering scientists from the area.

== Publications ==
- 1922: Researches on the insect metamorphosis. Doctoral Thesis on the histology of metamorphosis of the Chalcid wasp, Nasonia.
- 1922: On the arrangement of the striations of voluntary muscle fibres in double spirals.
- 1932: "The Innervation of the Striated Musculature in Python", The Australian Journal of Experimental Biology and Medical Science, Vol.9, No.1, (January 1932), pp. 191-201.
- 1938: Memoirs: The Embryonic Development of Calandra oryzae. (with Florence V. Murray) see Sitophilus oryzae the rice weevil.
- 1942: The ‘Dorsal Organ’ of the Embryo of Campodea.
- 1945: Memoirs: The Post-Embryonic Development of Hanseniella agilis (Symphyla).
- 1947: The development and affinities of the Pauropoda, based on a study of Pauropus silvaticus.
- 1955: The Path of the Slow Contractile Wave in Arthropod Muscle Fibre. (with E. Matthaei) Photographic records are consistent with the hypothesis that the slow waves move along the helicoid.

== Chronology ==
=== Life events summary ===
| Date | Event |
|---|---|
| 12 March 1897 | Born, Kangaroo Point, Brisbane, Australia. |
| Mar 1916 | Commenced at University of Queensland. |
| 2 May 1919 | BSc Hons, University of Queensland. |
| 1 April 1920 | Walter and Eliza Hall Fellowship in economic biology (for 2 years). |
| 29 April 1921 | MSc, University of Queensland. |
| 1922 | Acting Chair of Zoology, University of Adelaide. |
| 4 April 1922 | BSc, University of Adelaide. |
| 13 December 1922 | DSc, University of Adelaide. First such graduate from University of Queensland. |
| 1925 | Senior Lecturer, University of Melbourne. |
| 14 August 1926 | Married Ethel Mary Hamilton, Hawthorn. |
| 1928 | Rockefeller Travelling Fellowship, Cambridge, England, Utrecht, Netherlands. |
| 1928 | David Syme Research Prize. |

| Date | Event |
|---|---|
| 1 March 1931 | Associate Professor of Zoology, University of Melbourne. |
| 8 April 1933 | MSc, University of Melbourne. |
| 17 March 1944 | Elected a Fellow of the Royal Society. |
| 1 March 1948 | Chair of Zoology, University of Melbourne. |
| 1948 | Full Professor of Zoology. |
| 1950 | Dean of Faculty of Science (until 1952). |
| 1951 | Head of Department of Zoology, University of Melbourne. |
| 1954 | Founding Fellow of the Australian Academy of Science. |
| 1954 | British Council travel grant, England. |
| 1956 | Clarke Medal |
| 5 November 1956 | Died, Hawthorn, Melbourne, Australia. |

=== Award lineage ===
Awards
| Preceded by Rutherford Ness Robertson | Clarke Medal; 1956 | Succeeded by Irene Crespin |
