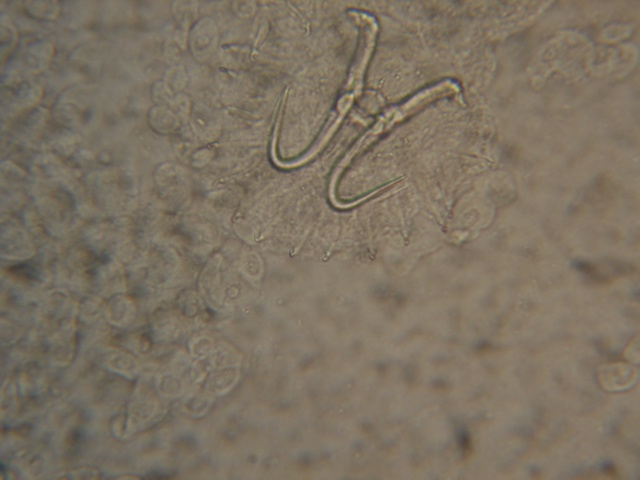
- An unidentified gyrodactylid

Scientific classification
- Kingdom: Animalia
- Phylum: Platyhelminthes
- Class: Monogenea
- Order: Gyrodactylidea
- Family: Gyrodactylidae; Cobbold, 1864

= Gyrodactylidae =

Family of flatworms

Gyrodactylidae is a family of flatworms in the order Gyrodactylidea.

== Genera ==
- Acanthoplacatus Ernst, Jones & Whittington, 2001
- Archigyrodactylus Mizelle & Kritsky, 1967
- Citharodactylus Přikrylová, Shinn & Paladini, 2017
- Fundulotrema Kritsky & Thatcher, 1977
- Gyrocerviceanseris Cone, Abbott, Gilmore & Burt, 2010
- Gyrodactyloides Bychowsky, 1947
- Gyrodactylus von Nordmann, 1832
- Isancistrum de Beauchamp, 1912
- Laminiscus Palsson & Beverley-Burton, 1983
- Micropolyclithrum Skinner, 1975
- Paragyrodactylus Gvozdev & Matrechov, 1953
- Polyclithrum Rogers, 1967
- Swingleus Rogers, 1969
