= Satyu Yamaguti =

Japanese parasitologist (1894–1976)

- 山口 左仲
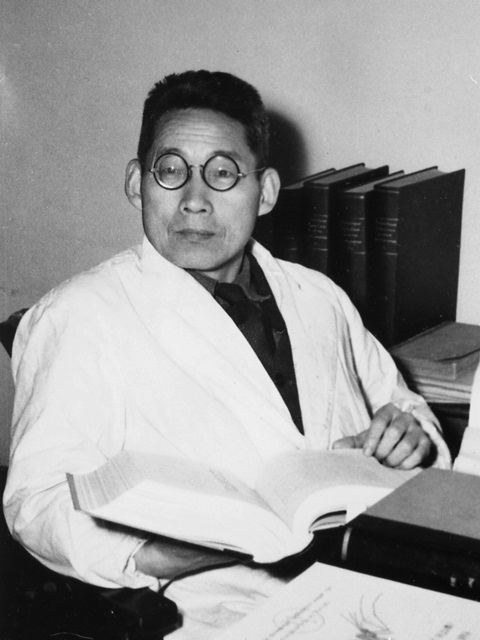
- Satyu Yamaguti
- Born: 21 April 1894; Nagano Prefecture, Japan
- Died: 11 March 1976 (aged 81); Kyoto, Japan
- Scientific career
- Fields: Parasitology
- Workplaces: Kyoto University, Okayama University, University of Hawaii, Tulane University

Satyu Yamaguti (山口 左仲, Yamaguchi Sachū; 21 April 1894 – 11 March 1976) was a Japanese parasitologist, entomologist, and helminthologist. He was a specialist of mosquitoes and helminths such as digeneans, monogeneans, cestodes, acanthocephalans and nematodes. He also worked on the parasitic crustaceans Copepoda and Branchiura. Satyu Yamaguti wrote more than 60 scientific papers and, more importantly, several huge monographs which are still in use by scientists all over the world and were cited over 1,000 times each.

== Education and career ==
Satyu Yamaguti was born in Nagano Prefecture, Japan, 21 April 1894.

He graduated from Okayama Medical College (1918), studied pathology at Tokyo University (1918-1925) and parasitology at the Institut für Tropenkrankheiten in Hamburg, Germany (1925-1926). He received his MD from Tokyo University in 1926 and was Dr. Sc. of Kyoto University in 1935. He was lecturer in parasitology in Kyoto University (1927-1943), parasitologist at the Naval Institute of Tropical Hygiene in Macassar (then "Celebes" – now Sulawesi, Indonesia) with the Japanese Navy (1943-1944), and special consultant of the Malaria Survey Detachment of the US Army (1946-1950). He became Professor of parasitology in Okayama University Medical School (1950), was a visiting professor at the University of Hawaii (1962-1966) and a Graduate Professor of Biology at Tulane University (1968-1969).

He wrote 166 papers and 26 books during his lifetime. He described 1,426 new species.

He died on 11 March 1976 in Kyoto, Japan.

== Awards and honours ==
- Councilor, The Japanese Society of Parasitology since 1927.
- President, The Japanese Society of Parasitology, 1938.
- Honorary Member, The Japanese Society of Parasitology, 1963.
- Honorary Member, American Society of Parasitologists, 1957.
- Honorary Member, Helminthological Society of India, 1957.
- Honorary Member, Zoological Society of India, 1957.
- Honorary Member, American Microscocopical Society, 1971.
- Honorary Member, The 3rd International Congress of Parasitology, 1974, München, Germany.
- Fulbright-Smith-Mundt grantee, 1954-1955.
- National Science Foundation grantee, 1955-1956, 1960-1962, 1962-1969.

== Important publications ==
- Studies on the helminth fauna of Japan Pt. 1-57, 1933-1961.
- Parasitic worms mainly from Celebes Pt. 1-11, 1952-1956.
- Parasitic copepods from fishes of Japan, 13 papers.
- Mosquito fauna of Japan and Korea, 213 pp., 1950 (monograph)
- Mosquito fauna of Guam, 101 pp., 1950 (monograph)
- Mosquito fauna of North America, Pt. I, 51 pp., 1950 (monograph).
- Mosquito fauna of North America, Pt. II, 85 pp., 1950 (monograph)
- Mosquito fauna of North America, Pt. Ill, 92 pp., 1950 (monograph).
- Mosquito fauna of North America, Pt. IV, 136 pp., 1950 (monograph).
- Mosquito fauna of North America. Pt. V, 265 pp., 1950 (monograph).
- Illustrated Keys to adult Culidne mosquitoes of America north of Mexico, 1952.
- Systema Helminthum. Vol. I, The Digenetic Trematodes of Vertebrates (in 2 Parts), 1958 (monograph)
- Systema Helminthum. Vol. II. The Cestodes of Vertebrates, 1959 (monograph).
- Systema Helminthum. Vol. III, The Nematodes of Vertebrates (in 2 Parts), 1961 (monograph).
- Systema He1minthum. Vol. IV ( Monogenea and Aspidocotylea, 1963 (monograph).
- Systema Helminthun1. Vol. V. Acanthocephala, 1963 (monograph).
- Parasitic Copepoda and Branchiura of Fishes, 1963 (monograph).
- Monogenetic Trematodes of Hawaiian Fishes, 1968 (monograph).
- Digenetic Trematodes of Hawaiian Fishes, 1970 (monograph).
- Synopsis of Digenetic Trematodes of Vertebrates, 1971 (monograph).
- A Synoptical Review of Life Histories of Digenetic Trematodes of Vertebrates, 1975 (monograph).

== Eponymous taxa ==
Numerous taxa were named in the honour of Satyu Yamaguti. Most are parasites. A few examples of genera are:

- Yamaguticotyla Price, 1959 (Monogenea, Bychowskicotylidae)
- Yamagutia Srivastava, 1939 (Digenea, Faustulidae)
- Yamagutiplectognathotrema Parukhin, 1977 (Digenea, Zoogonidae)
- Yamagutisentis Golvan, 1969 (Acanthocephala, Echinorhynchidae).

Many species were dedicated to Satyu Yamaguti and are generally named yamagutii (List in ION), such as Acleotrema yamagutii, or, more rarely, satyui (List in ION), such as Pseudorhabdosynochus satyui.

== Zoological nomenclature ==
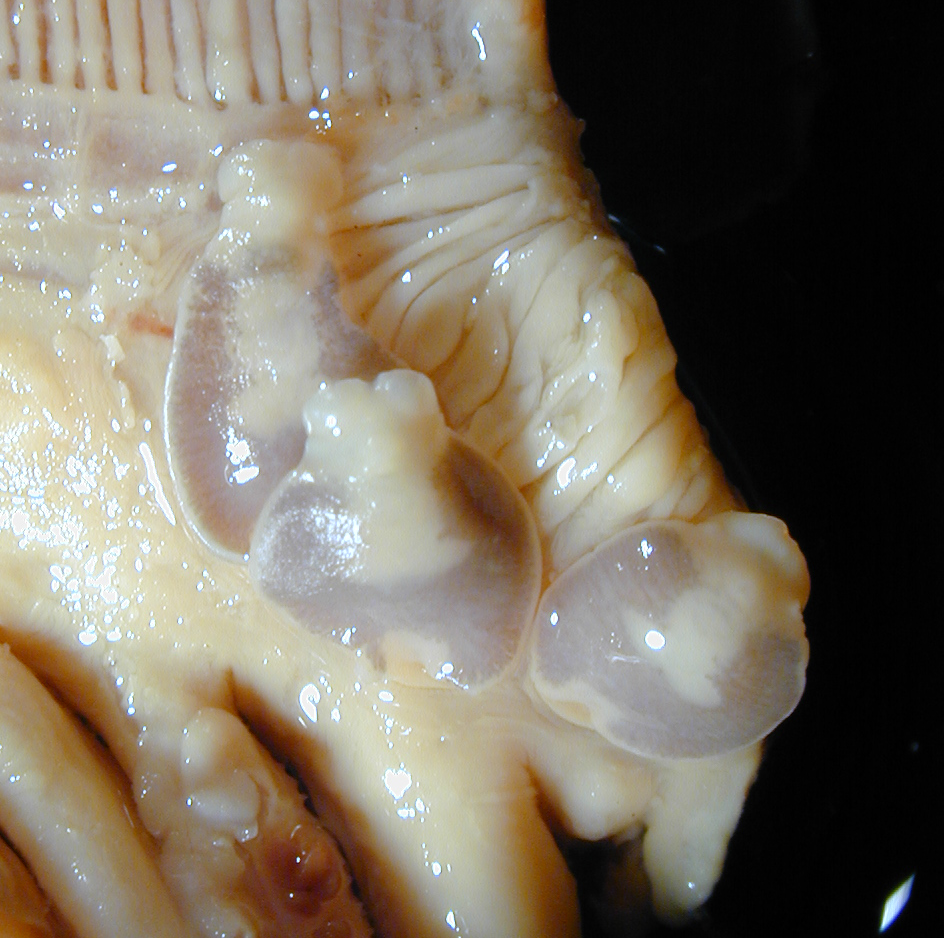
Lagenivaginopseudobenedenia sp.

Satyu Yamaguti created what is probably the longest currently valid genus name of the zoological nomenclature, Lagenivaginopseudobenedenia Yamaguti, 1966. This is a monogenean of the family Capsalidae, parasite on the gills of deep-sea fish of the family Lutjanidae.

== Obituaries ==
- Guillermina R. Caballero (1976), Satyu Yamaguti (1894-1976). Anales del Instituto de Biologia, Universidad Nacional Autonoma de México, 47 (2), 211-212 (dated 1976, published 1978)
- Anonymous (1976), Necrologia, Curriculum Vitae of Dr. Satyu Yamaguti. Revista Ibérica de Parasitologia, 36(1-2), 159-161
- The Meguro Parasitological Museum News, 1976, 121,6-13 (in Japanese) PDF
- Bauer, O. N., Gussev, A. V., Kurochkin, Yu. V., Polyansy, Yu. I. (1977) Professor Satyu Yamaguti (1894-1976). Folia Parasitologica, 24, 105-106.
