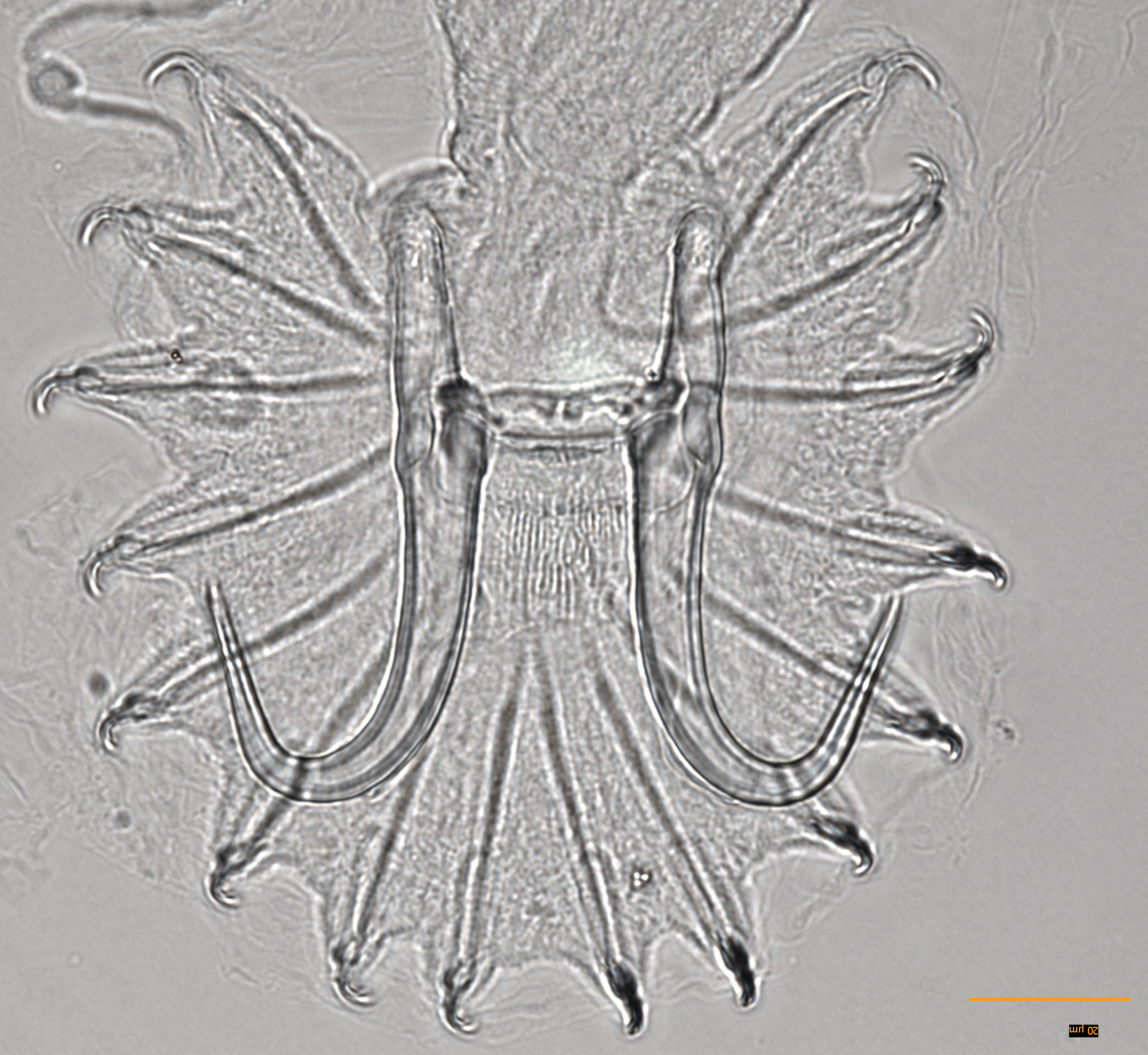
- Haptor of Gyrodactylus alexanderi found on Gasterosteus aculeatus (three-spined stickleback)

Scientific classification
- Kingdom: Animalia
- Phylum: Platyhelminthes
- Class: Monogenea
- Subclass: Monopisthocotylea
- Order: Gyrodactylidea

Families
- Acanthocotylidae Monticelli, 1903; Anoplodiscidae Tagliani, 1912; Bothitrematidae Price, 1936; Gyrodactylidae; Tetraonchoididae; Udonellidae Taschenberg, 1879

= Gyrodactylidea =

Order of flatworms

Gyrodactylidea is an order of monogenean parasitic flatworms in the subclass Monopisthocotylea.
