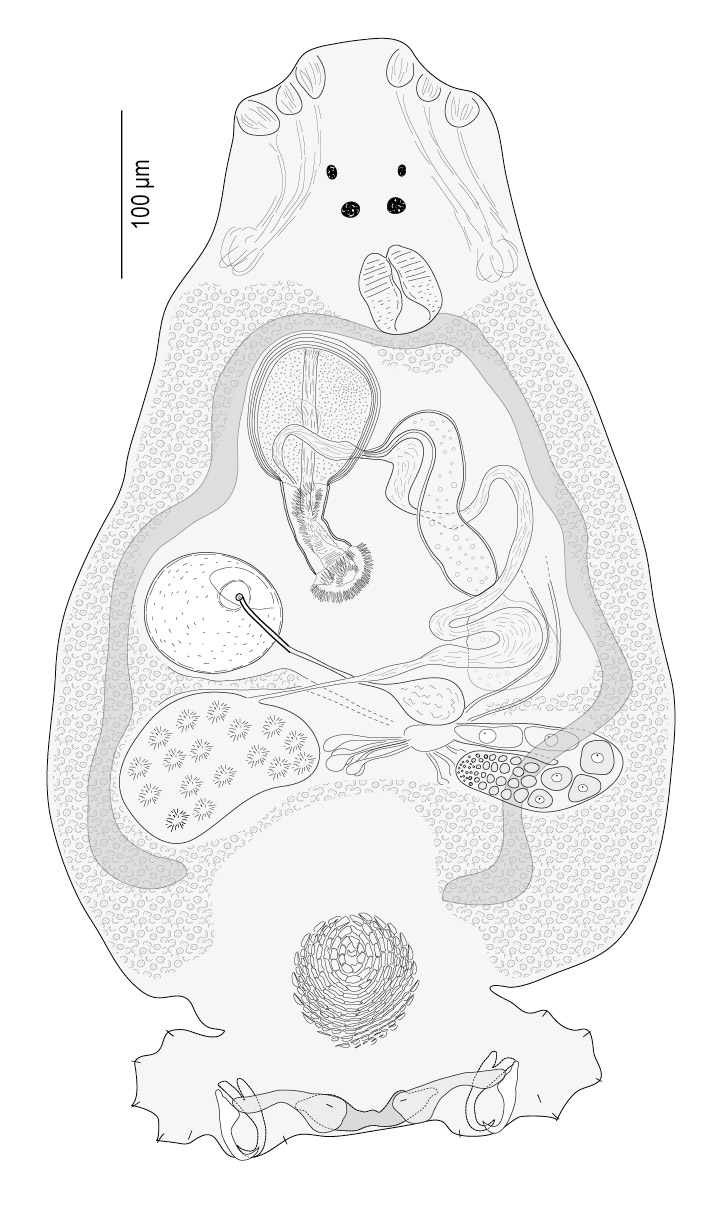
- Echinoplectanum laeve, a member of family Diplectanidae

Scientific classification
- Domain: Eukaryota
- Kingdom: Animalia
- Phylum: Platyhelminthes
- Class: Monogenea
- Subclass: Monopisthocotylea

= Monopisthocotylea =

Inferior class of parasitic flatworms in the class Monogenea

The Monopisthocotylea are an inferior class of parasitic flatworms in the class Monogenea.

== Classification ==
There are only two inferior classes in the class Monogenea:

- Monopisthocotylea. The name means "a huge sucker" - the attachment organ (the haptor) is simple.
- Polyopisthocotylea. The name means "a little sucker" - the attachment organ (the haptor) is complex, with several clamps or suckers.

The inferior class Monopisthocotylea contains these orders:

- Order Capsalidea
- Order Dactylogyridea
- Order Gyrodactylidea
- Order Monocotylidea
- Order Montchadskyellidea

== Example of species ==
- Entobdella soleae, a capsalid from the sole Solea solea off the United Kingdom
- Gyrodactylus salaris, a gyrodactylid, or "salmon fluke", a deadly parasite of salmon in Norway
- Calydiscoides euzeti, a diplectanid from the emperor, Lethrinus rubrioperculatus
- Pseudorhabdosynochus epinepheli, a diplectanid from groupers, and many other species of Pseudorhabdosynochus
- Cichlidogyrus evikae and many other species of the genus Cichlidogyrus, which are parasites on the gills of cichlid fish
