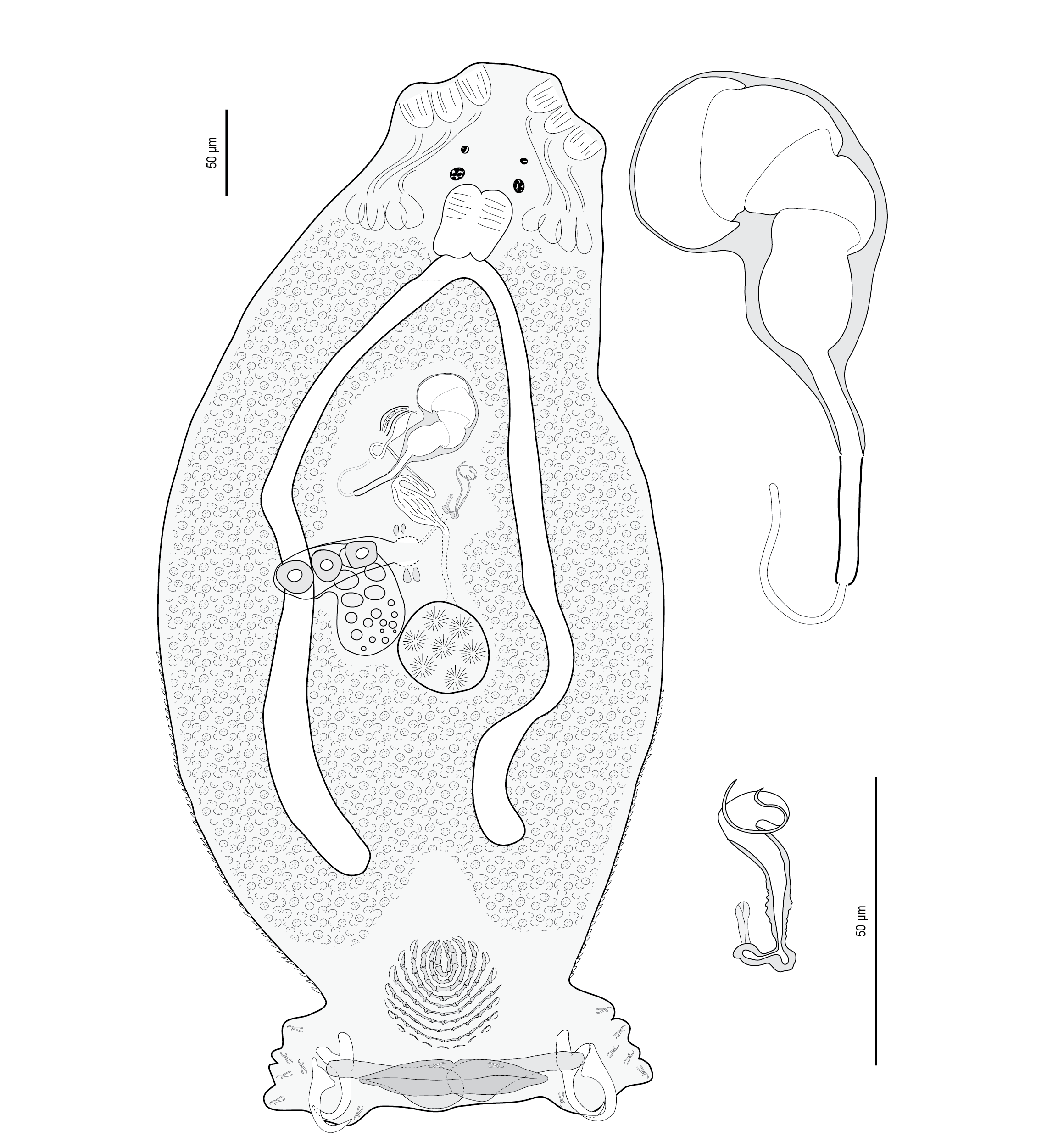
- Pseudorhabdosynochus manifestus

Scientific classification
- Kingdom: Animalia
- Phylum: Platyhelminthes
- Class: Monogenea
- Order: Dactylogyridea
- Family: Diplectanidae
- Genus: Pseudorhabdosynochus
- Species: P. manifestus

Binomial name
- Pseudorhabdosynochus manifestus Justine & Sigura, 2007

= Pseudorhabdosynochus manifestus =

Species of flatworm

Pseudorhabdosynochus manifestus is a diplectanid monogenean parasite first found in host Epinephelus malabaricus near Nouméa, between its secondary gill lamellae. It can infest its host by the hundreds. It was ascribed that name because it was the most abundant species found while its descriptive study was taking place. As appreciated from studying juvenile specimens, the development of female organs precedes that of male organs in this species and is likely the case in other Pseudorhabdosynochus species.

Pseudorhabdosynochus huitoe, Pseudorhabdosynochus shenzhenensis and Pseudorhabdosynochus serrani all share with P. manifestus: a sclerotised vagina with a conical primary canal with one lonely coil anteriorly, and small primary and secondary chambers. P. huitoe, furthermore, shares P. manifestus' characteristic spherical primary chamber with a think internal wall. P. manifestus is different by having a longer vagina, and morphological differences in the quadriloculate organ and hamuli.

P. shenzhenensis and P. serrani also differ from P. manifestus by measurements of hamuli and quadriloculate organs, which are greater in the latter. At the same time, the former do not show a distinctive ring in the posterior part of the primary canal, while the shape of their chambers is different as well. Finally, tegumental scales could also show morphological differences amongst these species.

== Description ==
It has an elongate body, with a length of about 670 μm and a width of about 290 μm. It possesses a scaly tegument, 3 pairs of head organs and 2 pairs of eyespots. The haptor is differentiated from its body, being less wide (about 220 μm), and exhibits 2 round squamodiscs, 2 pairs of lateral hamuli, 3 bars and 14 hooklets. There is a groove visible on the ventral side of its flat ventral bar.

It has a subspherical pharynx, with a length of about 50 μm, and lacks an esophagus, its intestinal bifurcation following the latter organ. It shows a simple caeca that terminates at the level of the posterior margin of its vitellarium. Its testis are also subspherical and intercaecal, with a length of approximately 70 μm; its quadriloculate organ with an inner length of about 51 μm. At the same time, its ovary is subequatorial, intercaecal and pretesticular, encircling the right caecum, with a width of about 80 μm. Its oviduct forms the ootype and is surrounded by the Mehlis gland; the ootype opens into the uterus. It counts with an unsclerotised, dorsally question mark-shaped vagina that is elongate; its total length is about 35 μm.

== Etymology ==
Pseudorhabdosynochus malabaricus is part of a series of six species of Pseudorhabdosynochus, all described from the malabar grouper, Epinephelus malabaricus. The authors indicated that "names of all new species described begin all by ‘ma-’ to provide an easy way to identify these species from E. malabaricus among the numerous species of Pseudorhabdosynochus already described or to be described". The species are P. maaensis, P. malabaricus, P. manifestus, P. manipulus, P. marcellus, and P. maternus. More precisely, for this species, the name manifestus is derived from the Latin word meaning "clear, evident", referring to the fact that this was the most abundant of the species.
