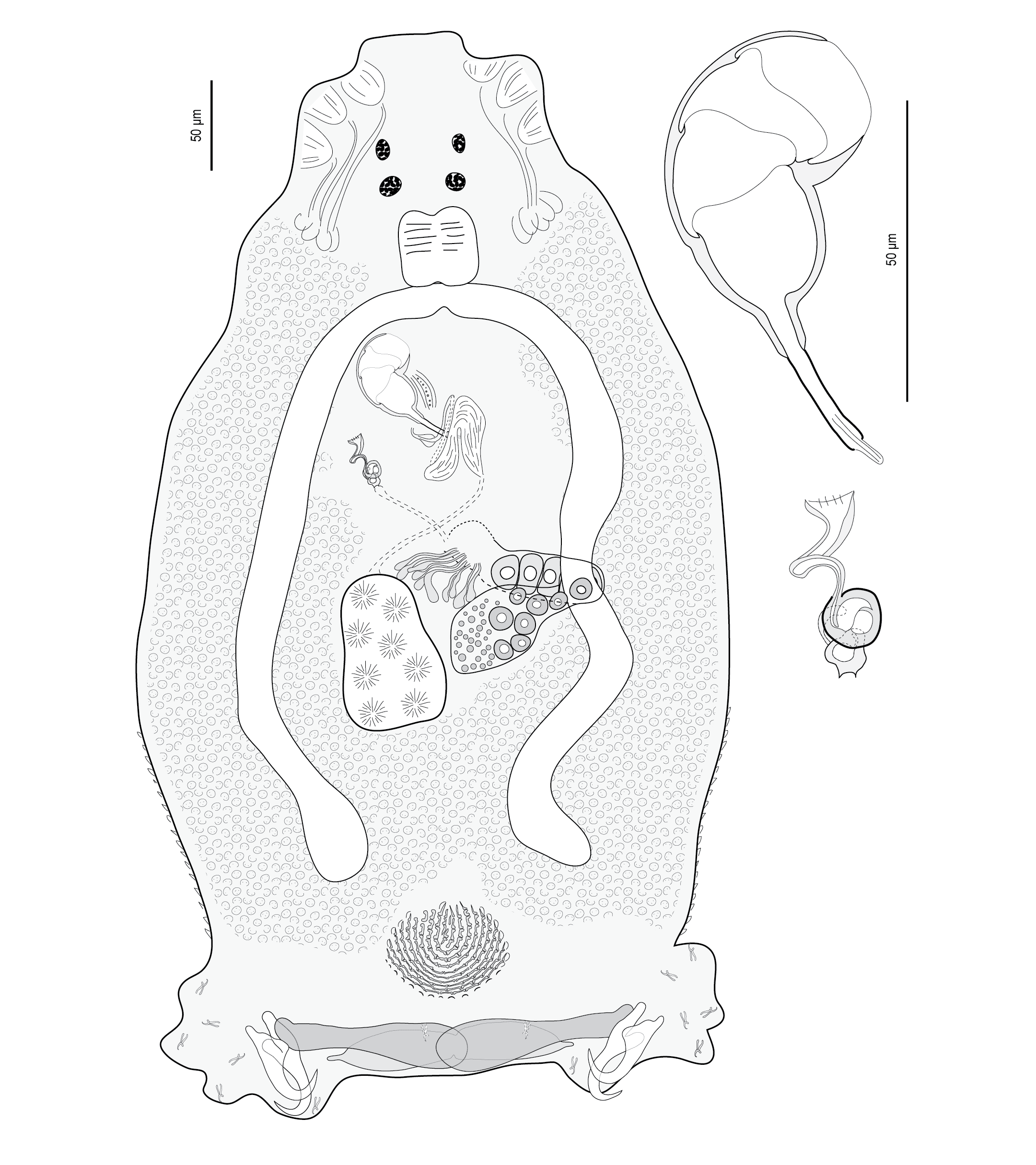

Scientific classification
- Kingdom: Animalia
- Phylum: Platyhelminthes
- Class: Monogenea
- Order: Dactylogyridea
- Family: Diplectanidae
- Genus: Pseudorhabdosynochus
- Species: P. maternus

Binomial name
- Pseudorhabdosynochus maternus Justine & Sigura, 2007

= Pseudorhabdosynochus maternus =

Species of flatworm

Pseudorhabdosynochus maternus is a diplectanid monogenean parasitic on the gills of the Malabar grouper, Epinephelus malabaricus. It has been described in 2007.

== Description ==
Pseudorhabdosynochus maternus is a small monogenean, 0.6 mm in length. The species has the general characteristics of other species of Pseudorhabdosynochus, with a flat body and a posterior haptor, which is the organ by which the monogenean attaches itself to the gill of is host. The haptor bears two squamodiscs, one ventral and one dorsal. The sclerotized male copulatory organ, or "quadriloculate organ", has the shape of a bean with four internal chambers, as in other species of Pseudorhabdosynochus. The vagina includes a sclerotized part, which is a complex structure. In this species, the sclerotised vagina has a big spherical primary chamber and a small spherical secondary chamber.

== Etymology ==
Pseudorhabdosynochus maternus is part of a series of six species of Pseudorhabdosynochus, all described from the Malabar grouper, Epinephelus malabaricus. The authors indicated that "names of all new species described begin all by ‘ma-’ to provide an easy way to identify these species from E. malabaricus among the numerous species of Pseudorhabdosynochus already described or to be described". The species are P. maaensis, P. malabaricus, P. manifestus, P. manipulus, P. marcellus, and P. maternus. More precisely, for this species, the name maternus is derived from the local French name of the host, ‘mère loche’ which translates as ‘mother grouper’.

== Hosts and localities ==
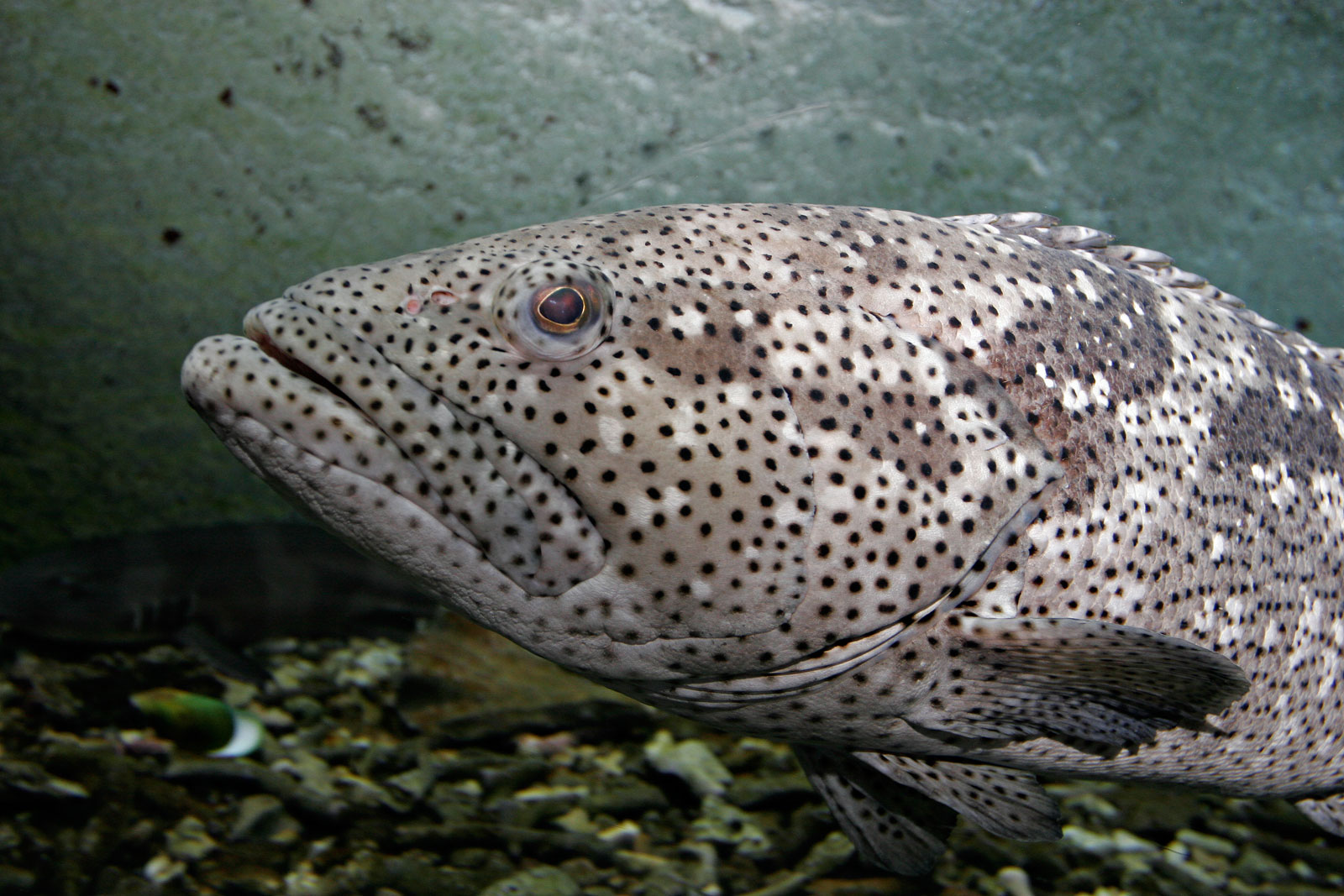
The Malabar grouper, Epinephelus malabaricus is the type-host of Pseudorhabdosynochus maternus

The type-host and only recorded host of P. maternus is the Malabar grouper, Epinephelus malabaricus (Serranidae: Epinephelinae). The type-locality and only recorded locality is the Barrier Reef off Nouméa, New Caledonia where it was considered a rare species.
