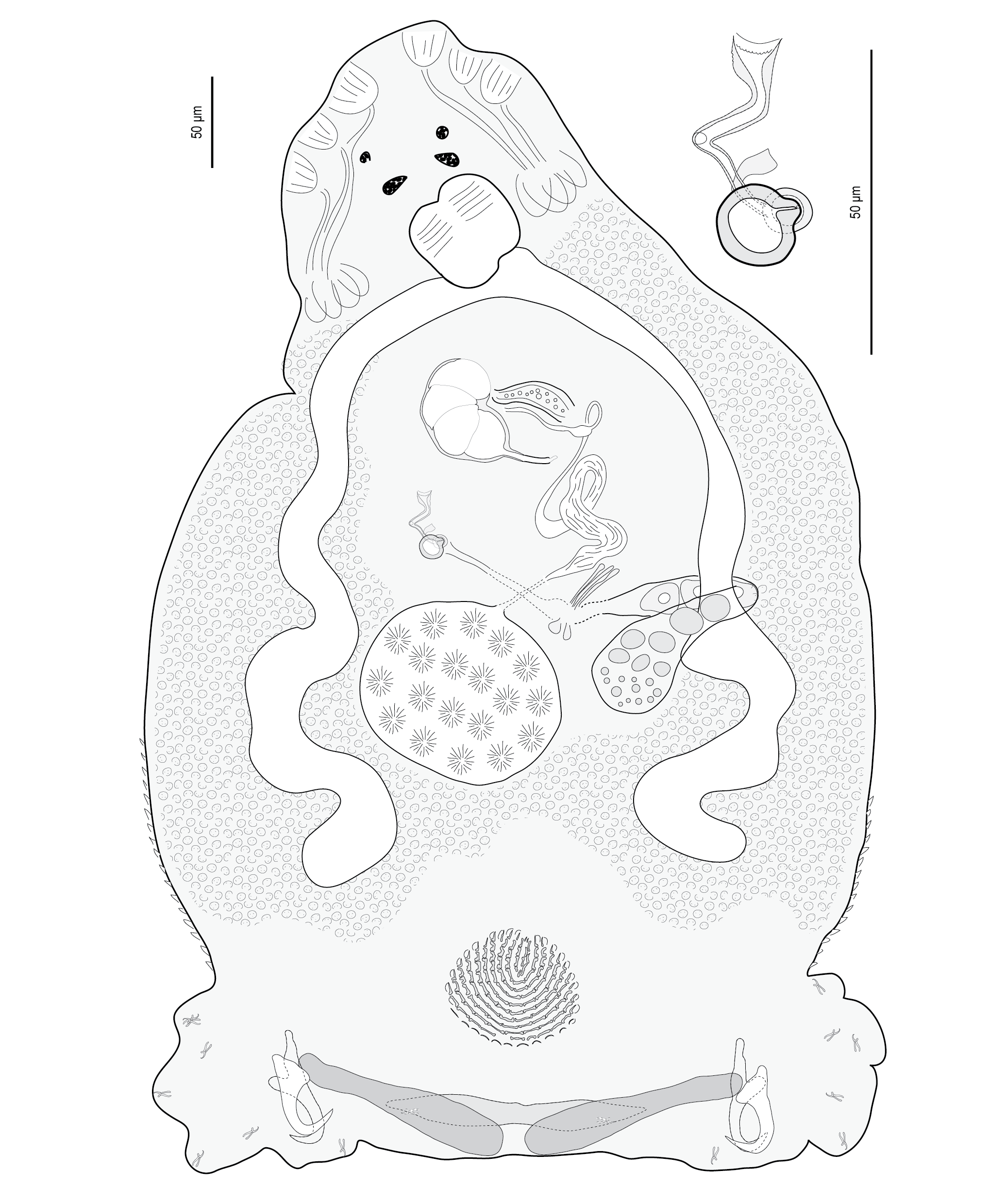

Scientific classification
- Kingdom: Animalia
- Phylum: Platyhelminthes
- Class: Monogenea
- Order: Dactylogyridea
- Family: Diplectanidae
- Genus: Pseudorhabdosynochus
- Species: P. malabaricus

Binomial name
- Pseudorhabdosynochus malabaricus Justine & Sigura, 2007

= Pseudorhabdosynochus malabaricus =

Species of flatworm

Pseudorhabdosynochus malabaricus is a diplectanid monogenean parasitic on the gills of the malabar grouper, Epinephelus malabaricus. It has been described in 2007.

== Description ==
Pseudorhabdosynochus malabaricus is a small monogenean, 0.6 mm in length. The species has the general characteristics of other species of Pseudorhabdosynochus, with a flat body and a posterior haptor, which is the organ by which the monogenean attaches itself to the gill of is host. The haptor bears two squamodiscs, one ventral and one dorsal. The sclerotized male copulatory organ, or "quadriloculate organ", has the shape of a bean with four internal chambers, as in other species of Pseudorhabdosynochus. The vagina includes a sclerotized part, which is a complex structure. In this species, both primary and secondary chambers of the sclerotised vagina are spherical.

== Etymology ==
Pseudorhabdosynochus malabaricus is part of a series of six species of Pseudorhabdosynochus, all described from the malabar grouper, Epinephelus malabaricus. The authors indicated that "names of all new species described begin all by ‘ma-’ to provide an easy way to identify these species from E. malabaricus among the numerous species of Pseudorhabdosynochus already described or to be described". The species are P. maaensis, P. malabaricus, P. manifestus, P. manipulus, P. marcellus, and P. maternus. More precisely, for this species, the name malabaricus is derived from the name of the host.

== Hosts and localities ==
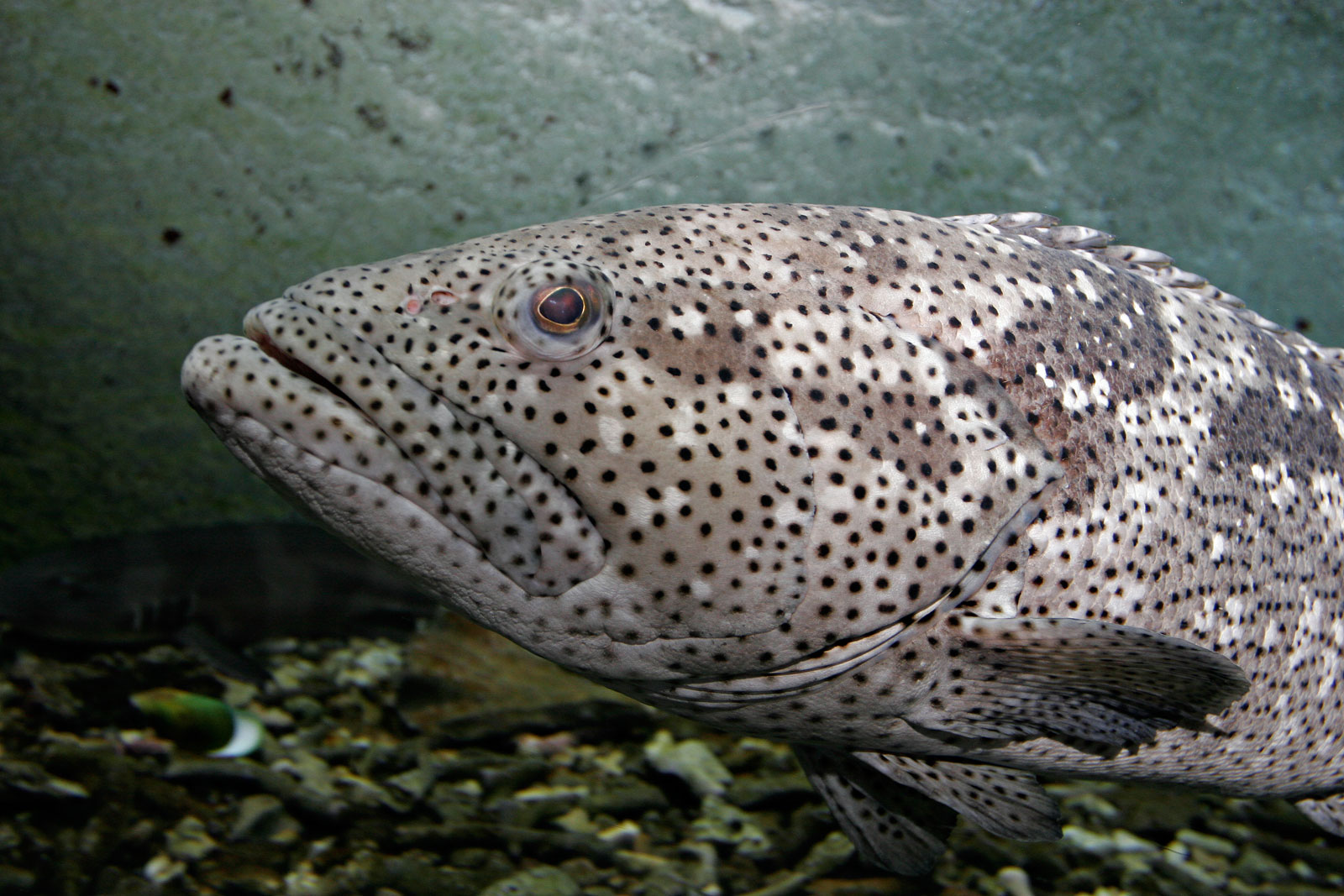
The Malabar grouper, Epinephelus malabaricus is the type-host of Pseudorhabdosynochus malabaricus

The type-host and only recorded host of P. malabaricus is the Malabar grouper, Epinephelus malabaricus (Serranidae: Epinephelinae). The type-locality and only recorded locality is the Barrier Reef off Nouméa, New Caledonia where it was considered a rare species.
