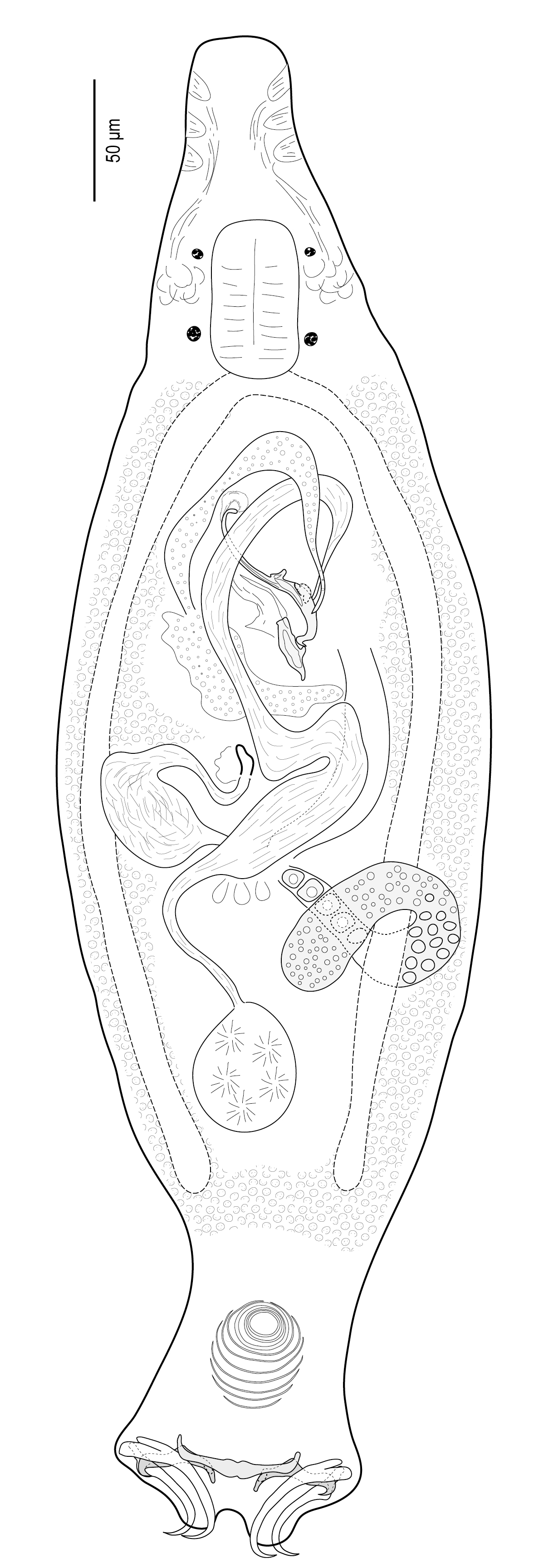
- Calydiscoides euzeti

Scientific classification
- Kingdom: Animalia
- Phylum: Platyhelminthes
- Class: Monogenea
- Order: Dactylogyridea
- Family: Diplectanidae
- Genus: Calydiscoides; Young, 1969

Species
- See text

= Calydiscoides =

Genus of flatworms

Calydiscoides is a genus of monopisthocotylean monogeneans, included in the family Diplectanidae.

The genus currently includes 16 species, which are all parasitic on the gills of marine fish of the family Lethrinidae and Nemipteridae. All species are from the Indo-Pacific Ocean. The type-species of the genus is Calydiscoides australis Young, 1969.

== Morphology ==
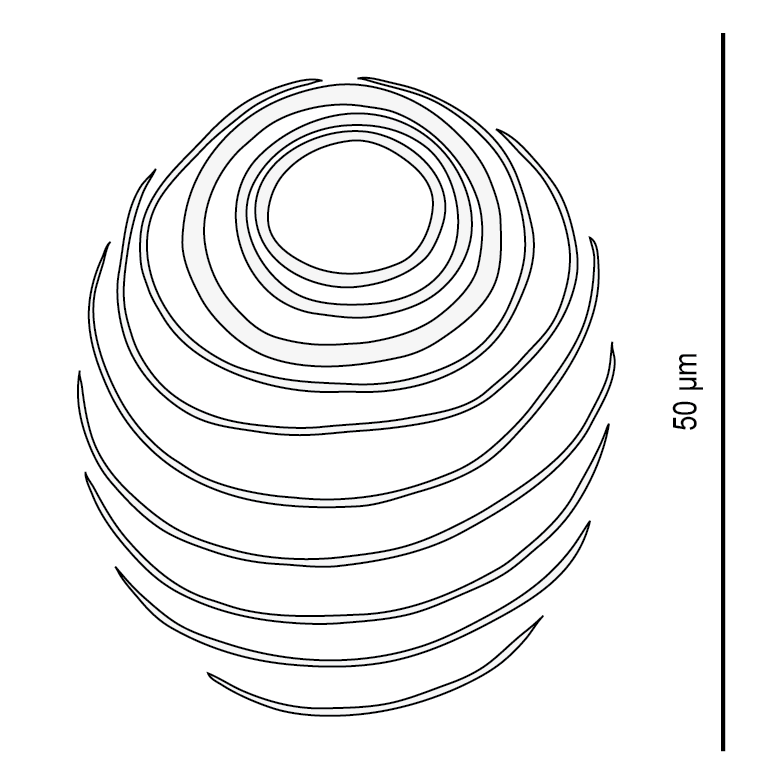
Lamellodisc of Calydiscoides euzeti

All species of Calydiscoides are small animals, ranging 0.5–1 mm in length.

As with most monogeneans, they are flat, with an anterior head bearing four oculi and head glands, a main elongate body and a posterior haptor. The digestive system includes an anterior muscular pharynx, and two lateral intestinal branches (or caeca); as in all Platyhelminthes, there is no anus. The haptor, in the posterior part of the body, is a specialized organ used to attach to the host. The haptor includes sclerotized elements, namely a ventral bar, two lateral (dorsal) bars, two ventral hooks, and two dorsal hooks, and fourteen hooklets. As in most diplectanids, the haptor bears characteristic, structures called squamodiscs (one ventral and one dorsal).

The squamodiscs of species of Calydiscoides are special: they are lamellodiscs, which are made up of concentric lamellae, not separate rodlets as in regular squamodiscs. The diameter of the lamellodiscs range 25–60 μm. When observed from its concentric axis (ventral or dorsal observation of the specimen, 'polar' view of the lamellodisc), the lamellodisc appears as concentric circles. Generally, central lamellae are circles, but peripheral lamellae may be circles or semicircles.

Adults are hermaphroditic. The reproductive organ include a single ovary and a single testis. As in all diplectanids, the ovary (or germarium) is anterior to the testis and loops around the right intestinal caecum. Species of Calydiscoides are characterized by a sclerotized male copulatory organ, which is used in systematics to differentiate species.

== Systematics ==
The characteristics of the lamellodisc, without paired elements, is the main character which differentiate Calydiscoides from other genera of the family Diplectanidae. Relationships of Calydiscoides Young, 1969 with Protolamellodiscus Oliver, 1969 are not clear; the two genera were described almost simultaneously, and it might be that they are synonym.

== Hosts ==
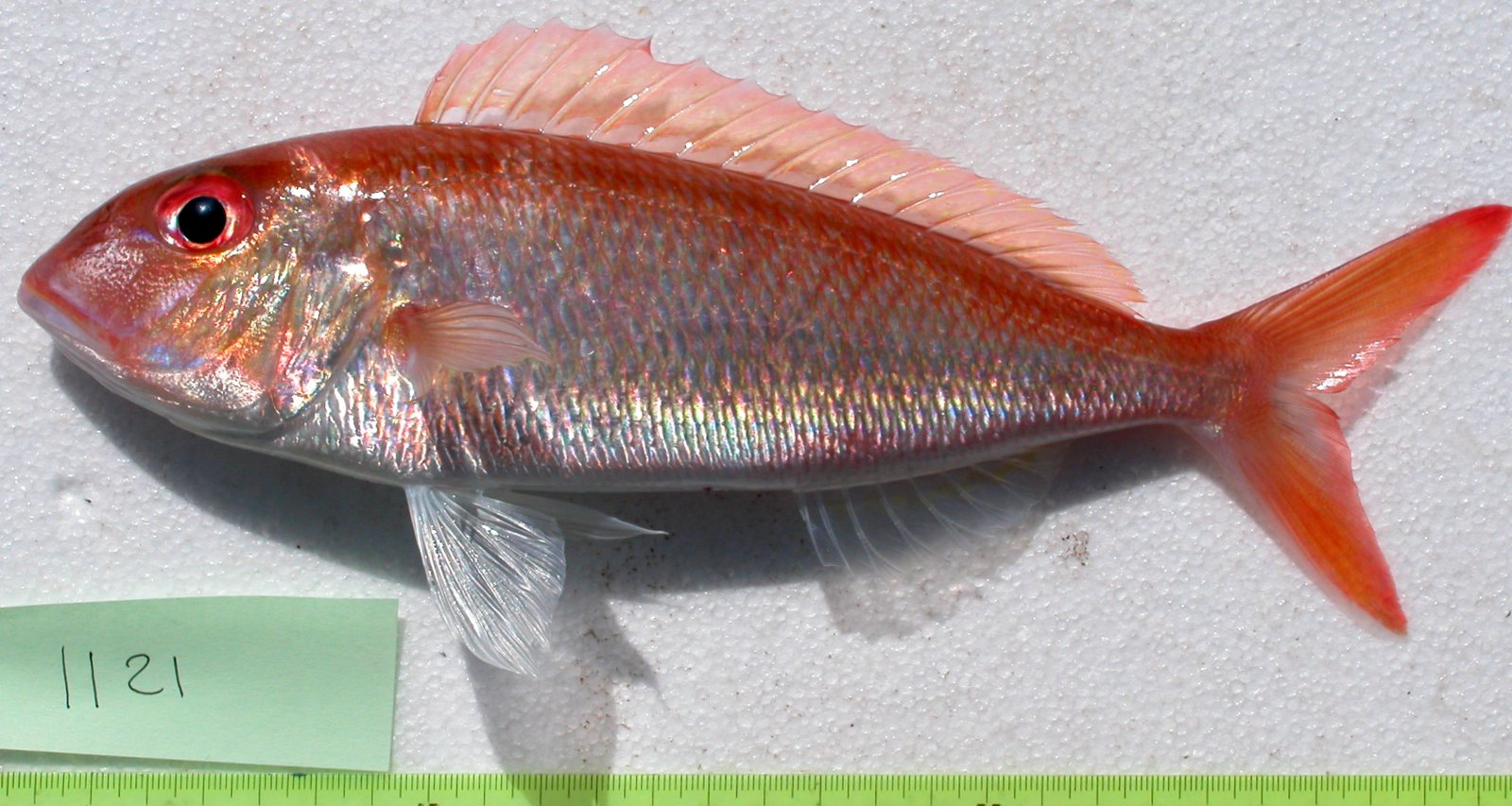

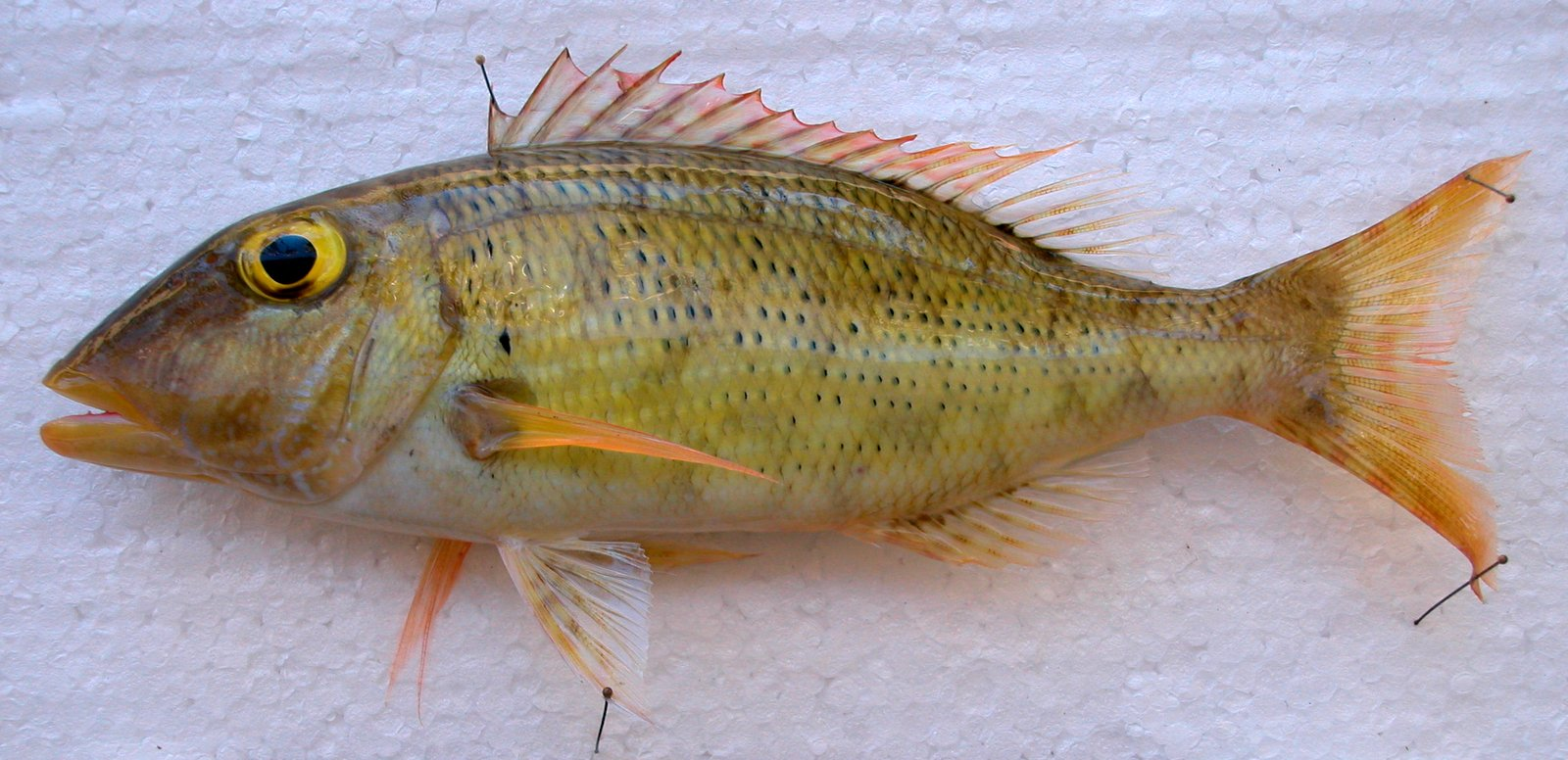
Threadfin breams (Nemipteridae) (up) and emperors (Lethrinidae) (bottom) are hosts of species of Calydiscoides in the Indo-Pacific Ocean

Hosts of species of Calydiscoides are only members of the families Nemipteridae (threadfin breams) and Lethrinidae (emperors). These families are restricted to the Indo-Pacific Ocean. Lethrinids known to harbour Calydiscoides species include Lethrinus miniatus, Lethrinus nebulosus and Lethrinus atkinsoni; nemipterids include Nemipterus japonicus, Scolopsis temporalis, Scolopsis monogramma, Scolopsis margaritifera and Pentapodus aureofasciatus. In all cases, species of Calydiscoides were only found on the gills of the fish.

== List of species ==
List according to the World Register of Marine Species

- Calydiscoides australis Young, 1969
- Calydiscoides conus Lim, 2003
- Calydiscoides cymbidioides Ding & Zhang, 1996
- Calydiscoides difficilis (Yamaguti, 1953) Young, 1969
- Calydiscoides duplicostatus (Yamaguti, 1953) Young, 1969
- Calydiscoides euzeti Justine, 2007
- Calydiscoides flexuosus (Yamaguti, 1953) Young, 1969
- Calydiscoides gussevi Oliver, 1984
- Calydiscoides japonicus (Pillai & Pillai, 1976) Thoney, 1989
- Calydiscoides kemamanensis Lim, 2003
- Calydiscoides limae Justine & Brena, 2009
- Calydiscoides monogrammae Lim, 2003
- Calydiscoides nemipteris Thoney, 1989
- Calydiscoides rohdei Oliver, 1984
- Calydiscoides scolopsidis Lim, 2003
- Calydiscoides terpsichore Rascalou & Justine, 2007
