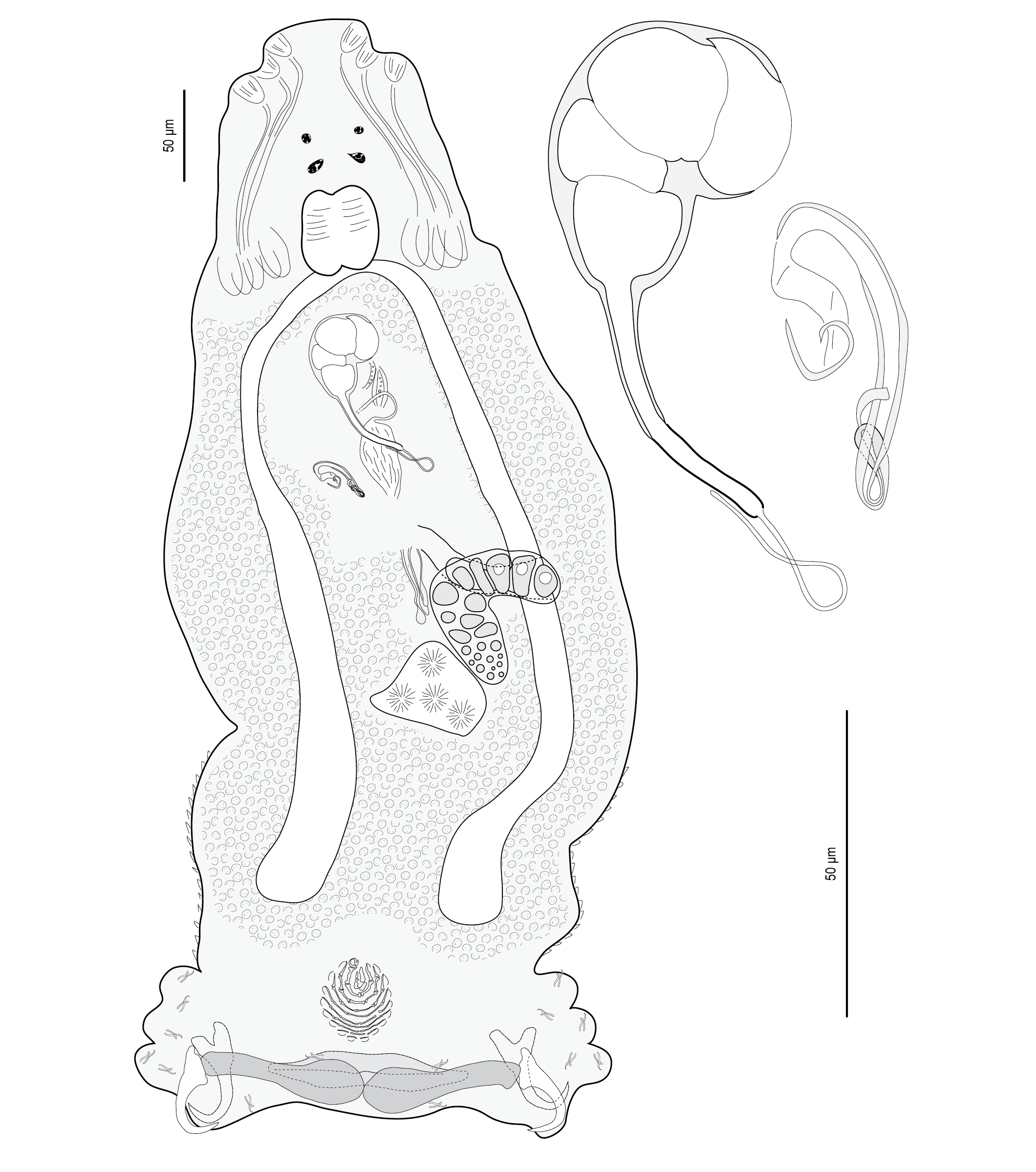

Scientific classification
- Kingdom: Animalia
- Phylum: Platyhelminthes
- Class: Monogenea
- Order: Dactylogyridea
- Family: Diplectanidae
- Genus: Pseudorhabdosynochus
- Species: P. marcellus

Binomial name
- Pseudorhabdosynochus marcellus Justine & Sigura, 2007

= Pseudorhabdosynochus marcellus =

Species of flatworm

Pseudorhabdosynochus marcellus is a diplectanid monogenean parasitic on the gills of the malabar grouper, Epinephelus malabaricus. It was described in 2007.

== Description ==
Pseudorhabdosynochus marcellus is a small monogenean, 0.6 mm in length. The species has the general characteristics of other species of Pseudorhabdosynochus, with a flat body and a posterior haptor, which is the organ by which the monogenean attaches itself to the gill of is host. The haptor bears two squamodiscs, one ventral and one dorsal. The sclerotized male copulatory organ, or "quadriloculate organ", has the shape of a bean with four internal chambers, as in other species of Pseudorhabdosynochus. The vagina includes a sclerotized part, which is a complex structure. In this species, the sclerotised vagina has a long primary canal and the primary chamber and secondary chamber are embedded in same distal sclerotised part.

== Etymology ==
Pseudorhabdosynochus marcellus is part of a series of six species of Pseudorhabdosynochus, all described from the malabar grouper, Epinephelus malabaricus. The authors indicated that "names of all new species described begin all by ‘ma-’ to provide an easy way to identify these species from E. malabaricus among the numerous species of Pseudorhabdosynochus already described or to be described". The species are P. maaensis, P. malabaricus, P. manifestus, P. manipulus, P. marcellus, and P. maternus. More precisely, for this species, the name marcellus refers to Tonton Marcel, a character of a locally well-known New Caledonian comic strip series, La Brousse en folie.

== Hosts and localities ==
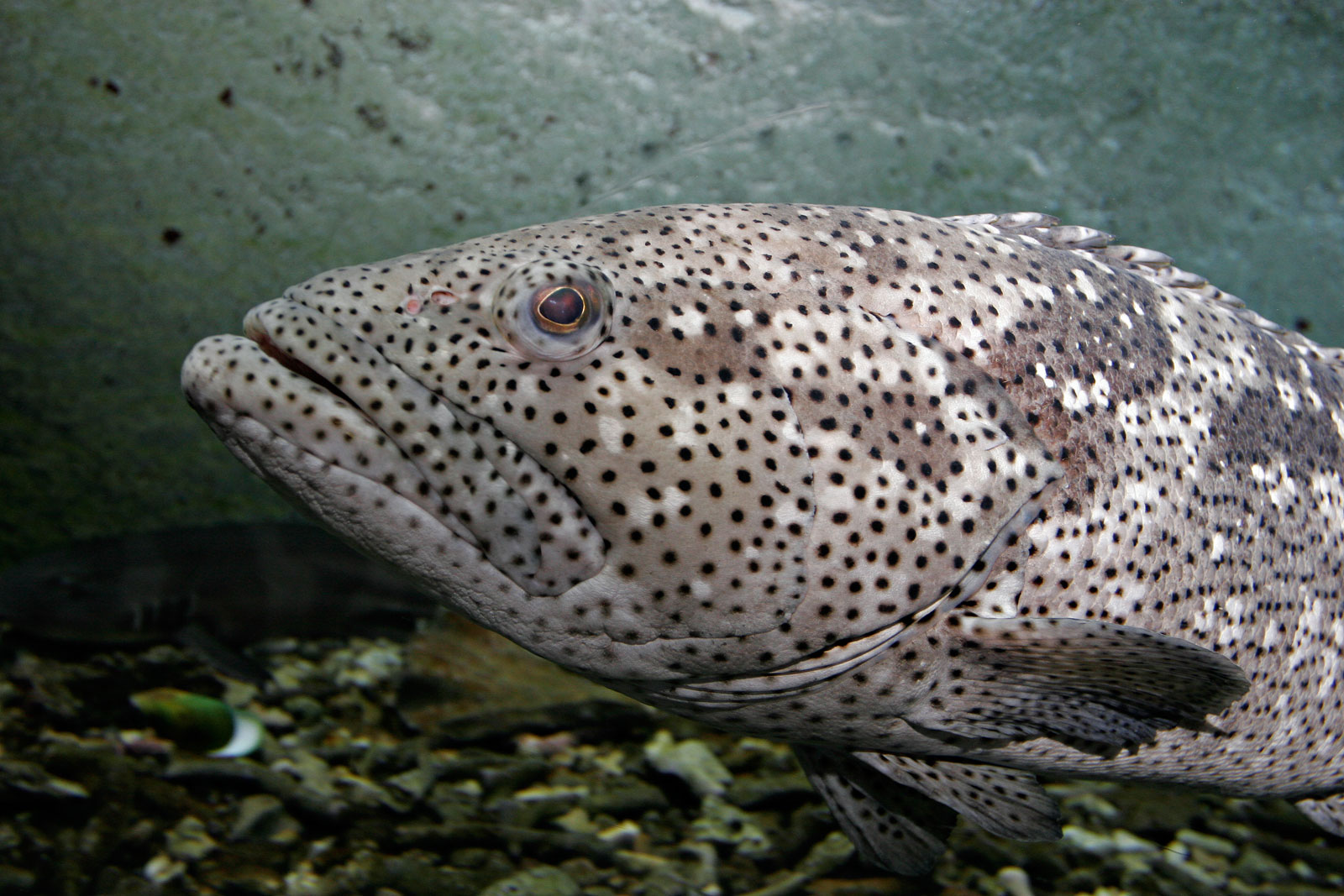
The malabar grouper, Epinephelus malabaricus is the type-host of Pseudorhabdosynochus marcellus

The type-host and only recorded host of P. marcellus is the malabar grouper, Epinephelus malabaricus (Serranidae: Epinephelinae). The type-locality is near Nouméa, New Caledonia where it was considered a very rare species (only 1% of the diplectanids found).
