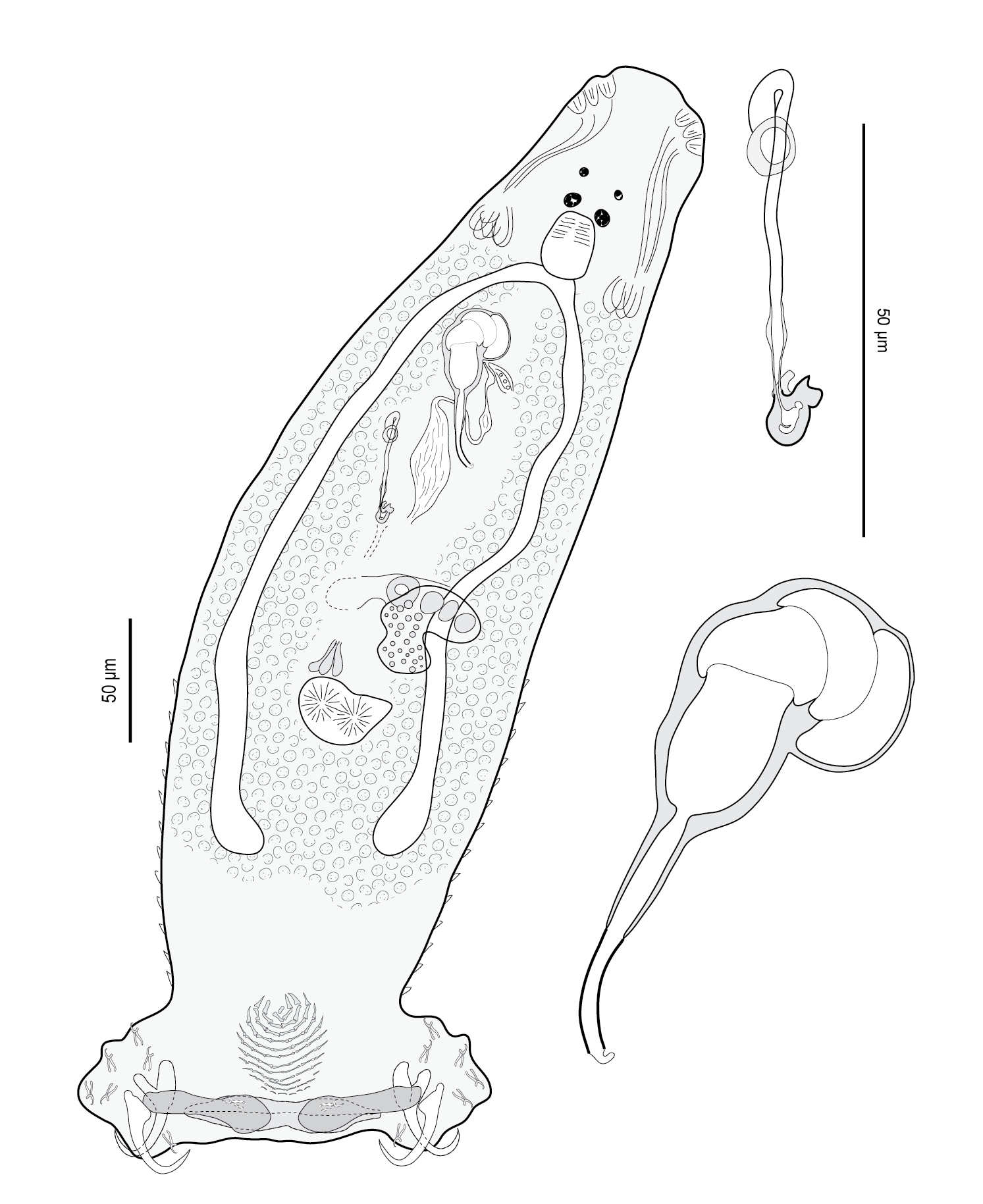

Scientific classification
- Kingdom: Animalia
- Phylum: Platyhelminthes
- Class: Monogenea
- Order: Dactylogyridea
- Family: Diplectanidae
- Genus: Pseudorhabdosynochus
- Species: P. maaensis

Binomial name
- Pseudorhabdosynochus maaensis Justine & Sigura, 2007

= Pseudorhabdosynochus maaensis =

Species of flatworm

Pseudorhabdosynochus maaensis is a diplectanid monogenean parasitic on the gills of the malabar grouper, Epinephelus malabaricus. It has been described in 2007.

== Description ==
Pseudorhabdosynochus maaensis is a small monogenean, 0.5 mm in length. The species has the general characteristics of other species of Pseudorhabdosynochus, with a flat body and a posterior haptor, which is the organ by which the monogenean attaches itself to the gill of is host. The haptor bears two squamodiscs, one ventral and one dorsal. The sclerotized male copulatory organ, or "quadriloculate organ", has the shape of a bean with four internal chambers, as in other species of Pseudorhabdosynochus. The vagina includes a sclerotized part, which is a complex structure. In this species, the sclerotised vagina includes a thin primary canal and a distal heavily sclerotised part including primary chamber and secondary chamber.

== Etymology ==
Pseudorhabdosynochus maaensis is part of a series of six species of Pseudorhabdosynochus, all described from the malabar grouper, Epinephelus malabaricus. The authors indicated that "names of all new species described begin all by ‘ma-’ to provide an easy way to identify these species from E. malabaricus among the numerous species of Pseudorhabdosynochus already described or to be described". The species are P. maaensis, P. malabaricus, P. manifestus, P. manipulus, P. marcellus, and P. maternus. More precisely, for this species, the name maaensis is derived from the type-locality, Baie Maa, a bay near Nouméa, New Caledonia.

== Hosts and localities ==
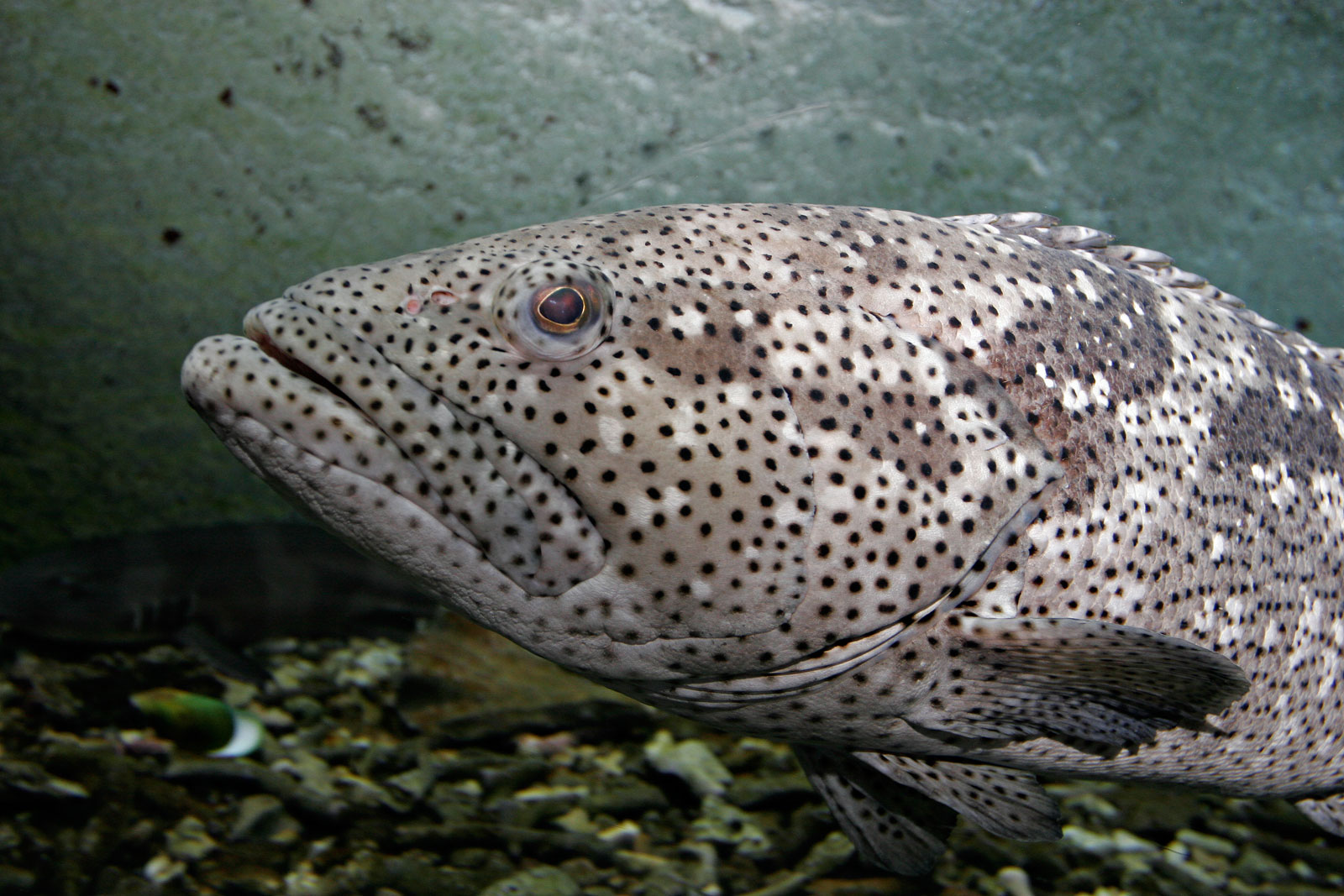
The malabar grouper, Epinephelus malabaricus is the type-host of Pseudorhabdosynochus maaensis

The type-host and only recorded host of P. maaensis is the malabar grouper, Epinephelus malabaricus (Serranidae: Epinephelinae). The type-locality is Bay Maa near Nouméa, New Caledonia where it was considered a rare species.
