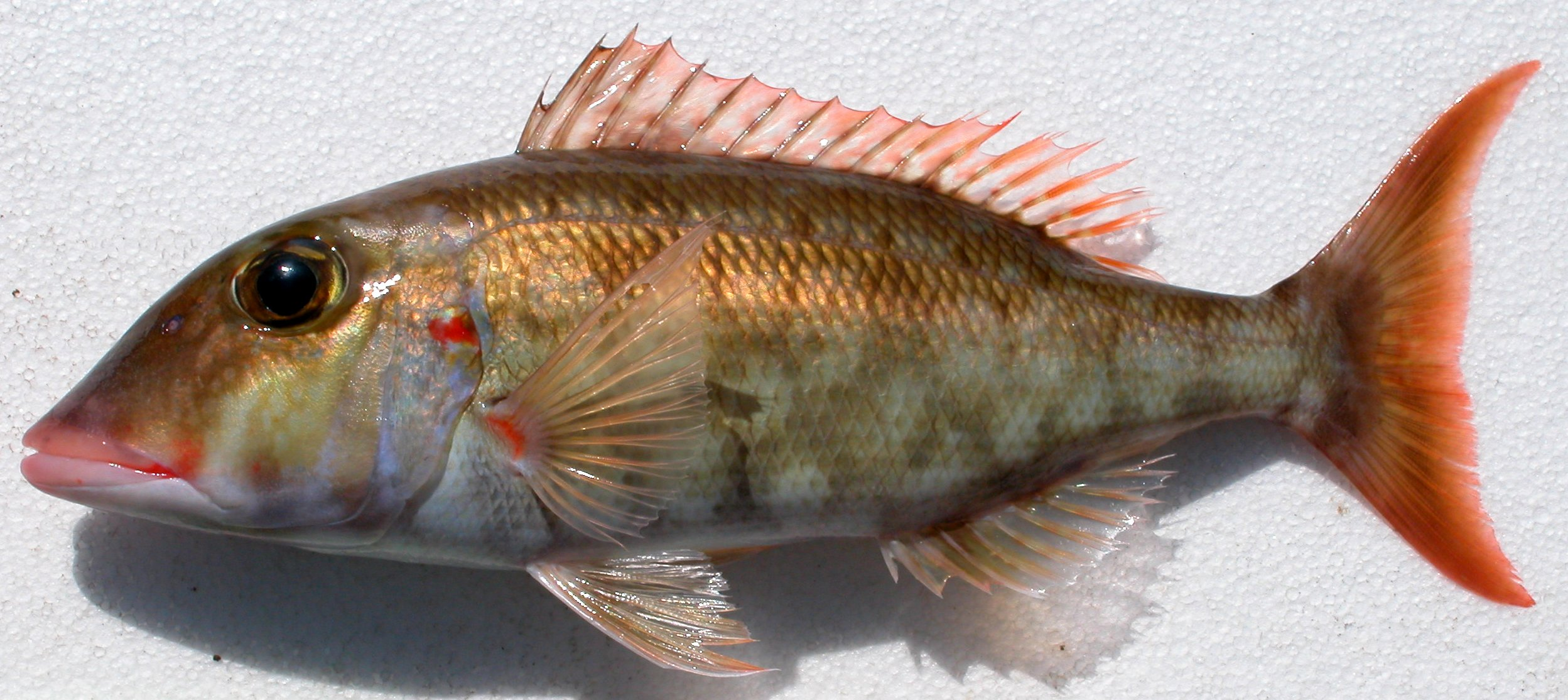

Conservation status
- Least Concern (IUCN 3.1)

Scientific classification
- Kingdom: Animalia
- Phylum: Chordata
- Class: Actinopterygii
- Division: Teleostei
- Order: Acanthuriformes
- Family: Lethrinidae
- Genus: Lethrinus
- Species: L. rubrioperculatus

Binomial name
- Lethrinus rubrioperculatus Sato, 1978

= Lethrinus rubrioperculatus =

Species of fish

Lethrinus rubrioperculatus, the spotcheek emperor, red-eared emperor, red-ears, red-edged emperor, scarlet-cheek emperor, and spot cheek emperor, is a species of marine ray-finned fish belonging to the family Lethrinidae, the emperors or emperor breams. This species has a wide Indo-Pacific distribution.

== Description ==
Lethrinus rubrioperculatus grows to and is brown or olive-grey in colour. It has small, scattered blotches that are irregular in chape. The Body depth 2.94 to 3.18 times in standard length. Body color is olive-gray or brown, with scattered irregular small black blotches. There is normally a red spot present on the top edge of the operculum. The lips are normally red. The fins are pinkish or pale in colour.

== Distribution ==
Lethrinus rubrioperculatus is found in numerous locations, including East African waters, southern Japan and Taiwan, the Marquesas Islands, New Caledonia and the northern half of Australia.

== Habitat ==
Lethrinus rubrioperculatus lives over sandy bottoms, in areas where rubble is present, and along the slopes of outer reefs. Although reef-associated, Lethrinus rubrioperculatus also occurs at depths of up to 160 metres, much deeper than most other species in this genus. This species is non-migratory.

== Diet ==
Lethrinus rubrioperculatus eats mostly crustaceans, mollusks, echinoderms, and other fishes.

== Human uses ==
Lethrinus rubrioperculatus is caught commercially.

== Parasites ==
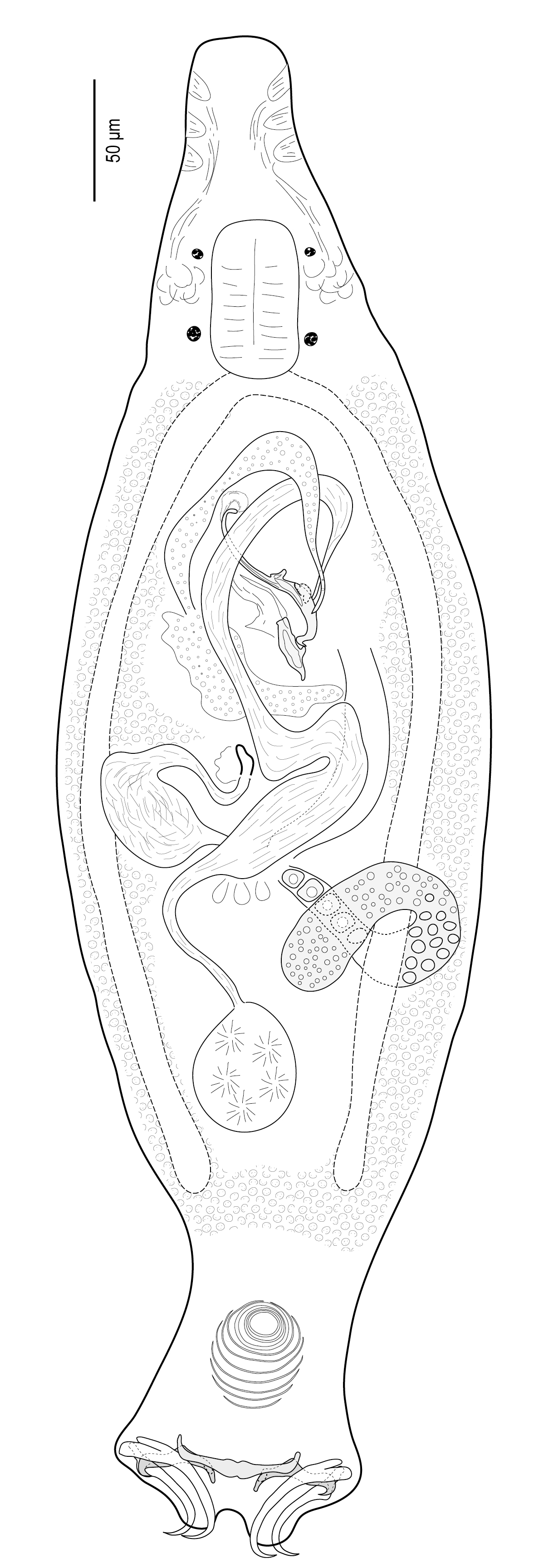
Calydiscoides euzeti, a monogenean parasite of L. rubrioperculatus

Lethrinus rubrioperculatus, as in most fish, is the host of many species of parasites. Monogeneans parasitic on the gills include the diplectanid Calydiscoides euzeti, the ancyrocephalids Lethrinitrema gibbus and Lethrinitrema dossenus and several capsalids. Copepods parasitic on the gills include the caligid Caligus lethrinicola and the lernanthropid Sagum vespertilio. The gills also harbour unidentified gnathiid isopod larvae. The digestive tract harbours an unidentified Acanthocephala, unidentified tetraphyllid cestodes, species of the anisakid nematode Raphidascaris (Ichthyascaris), and a variety of digeneans, including the acanthocolpid Stephanostomum aaravi, the hemiurid Lecithochirium sp. and Tubulovesicula angusticauda, the opecoelid Pseudoplagioporus interruptus and three other opecoelids. The abdominal cavity contains two species of larval tetrarhynch cestodes, the otobothriid Otobothrium parvum and the tentaculariid Nybelinia goreensis. In New Caledonia, where its parasites were particularly studied, Lethrinus rubrioperculatus has a total of twenty species of parasites.
