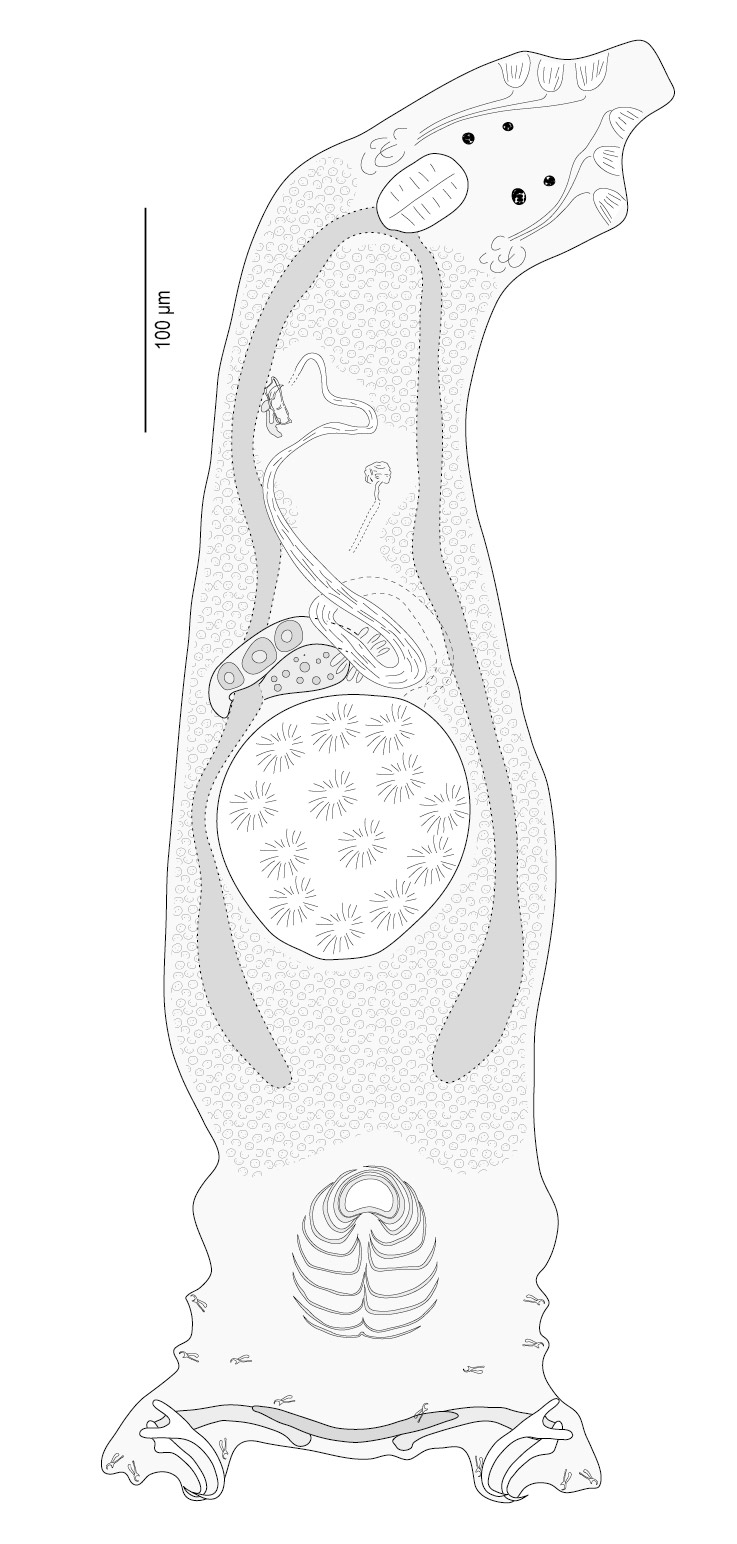
- Lamellodiscus parvicornis

Scientific classification
- Kingdom: Animalia
- Phylum: Platyhelminthes
- Class: Monogenea
- Order: Dactylogyridea
- Family: Diplectanidae
- Genus: Lamellodiscus; Johnston & Tiegs, 1922

= Lamellodiscus =

Genus of flatworms

Lamellodiscus is a genus of monopisthocotylean monogeneans in the family Diplectanidae; all species of Lamellodiscus are small worms, parasitic on the gills of teleost fish.

The type-species of the genus is Lamellodiscus typicus Johnston & Tiegs, 1922, a parasite of a sparid fish caught in Moreton Bay, Queensland, Australia.

== Etymology ==
T. Harvey Johnston & Oscar Werner Tiegs, who created the genus in 1922, did not formally explain the etymology of the new name. However, their definition of the new genus "disc well developed, with the accessory locomotory disc (squamodisc) peculiarly modified in such a way as to present numerous concentric rows consisting each of a pair of laterally elongated lamellae" shows that the name refers to the lamellae of the squamodisc (an attachment organ). Such an organ is now called a lamellodisc.

== Hosts ==
Hosts of Lamellodiscus species are mainly sparids and lethrinids, with very rare cases reported from centracanthids, pomacanthids and pomacentrids.

== Species ==
Species include:

- Lamellodiscus acanthopagri Roubal, 1981
- Lamellodiscus baeri Oliver, 1974
- Lamellodiscus bidens Euzet, 1984
- Lamellodiscus butcheri Byrnes, 1987
- Lamellodiscus caballeroi Venkatanarsaiah & Kullkarni, 1980
- Lamellodiscus cirrusspiralis Byrnes, 1987
- Lamellodiscus confusus Amine, Euzet & Kechemir-Issad, 2007
- Lamellodiscus corallinus Paperna, 1965
- Lamellodiscus coronatus Euzet & Oliver, 1966
- Lamellodiscus crampus Neifar, 2008
- Lamellodiscus dentexi Aleshkina, 1984
- Lamellodiscus donatellae Aquaro, Riva & Galli, 2009
- Lamellodiscus drummondi Euzet & Oliver, 1967
- Lamellodiscus echeneis (Wagener, 1857)
- Lamellodiscus elegans Bychowsky, 1957
- Lamellodiscus epsilon Yamaguti, 1968
- Lamellodiscus ergensi Euzet & Oliver, 1966
- Lamellodiscus erythrini Euzet & Oliver, 1966
- Lamellodiscus euzeti Diamanka, Boudaya, Toguebaye & Pariselle, 2011
- Lamellodiscus falcus Amine, Euzet & Kechemir-Issad, 2006
- Lamellodiscus flagellatus Boudaya, Neifar & Euzet, 2009
- Lamellodiscus fraternus Bychowsky, 1957
- Lamellodiscus furcillatus Kritsky, Jimenez-Ruiz & Sey, 2000
- Lamellodiscus furcosus Euzet & Oliver, 1966
- Lamellodiscus gracilis Euzet & Oliver, 1966
- Lamellodiscus hilii Euzet, 1984
- Lamellodiscus ignoratus Palombi, 1943
- Lamellodiscus impervius Euzet, 1984
- Lamellodiscus indicus Tripathi, 1959
- Lamellodiscus kechemirae Amine & Euzet, 2005
- Lamellodiscus knoepffleri Oliver, 1969
- Lamellodiscus louiseuzeti Diamanka, Drame & Pariselle, 2026
- Lamellodiscus magnicornis Justine & Briand, 2010
- Lamellodiscus major Murray, 1931
- Lamellodiscus mirandus Euzet & Oliver, 1966
- Lamellodiscus mormyri Euzet & Oliver, 1967
- Lamellodiscus neifari Amine, Euzet & Kechemir-Issad, 2006
- Lamellodiscus niedashui Li, Zhang & Yang, 1995
- Lamellodiscus pagrosomi Murray, 1931
- Lamellodiscus parisi Oliver, 1969
- Lamellodiscus parvicornis Justine & Briand, 2010
- Lamellodiscus rastellus Neifar, Euzet & Oliver, 2004
- Lamellodiscus sanfilippoi Amine, Neifar & Euzet, 2006
- Lamellodiscus sarculus Neifar, Euzet & Oliver, 2004
- Lamellodiscus sigillatus Neifar, Euzet & Oliver, 2004
- Lamellodiscus spari Zhukov, 1970
- Lamellodiscus squamosus Roubal, 1981
- Lamellodiscus takitai Ogawa & Eugusa, 1978
- Lamellodiscus theroni Amine, Euzet & Kechemir-Issad, 2007
- Lamellodiscus toguebayei Diamanka, Neifar, Pariselle & Euzet, 2011
- Lamellodiscus tomentosus Amine & Euzet, 2005
- Lamellodiscus triacies Diamanka, Neifar, Pariselle & Euzet, 2011
- Lamellodiscus tubulicornis Justine & Briand, 2010
- Lamellodiscus typicus Johnston & Tiegs, 1922
- Lamellodiscus vaginalis Byrnes, 1987
- Lamellodiscus verberis Euzet & Oliver, 1967
- Lamellodiscus vicinus Diamanka, Neifar, Pariselle & Euzet, 2011
- Lamellodiscus virgula Euzet & Oliver, 1967
