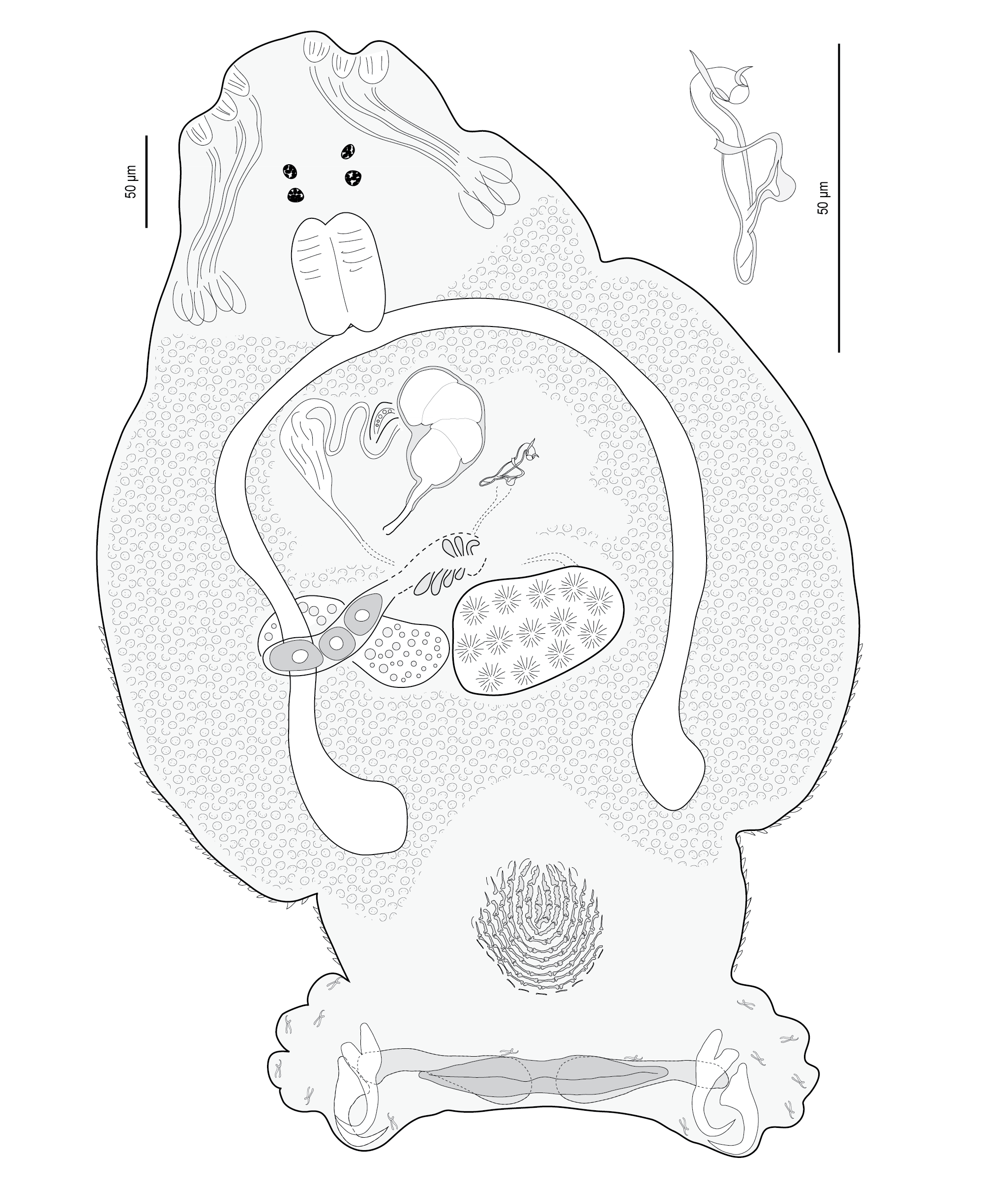

Scientific classification
- Kingdom: Animalia
- Phylum: Platyhelminthes
- Class: Monogenea
- Order: Dactylogyridea
- Family: Diplectanidae
- Genus: Pseudorhabdosynochus
- Species: P. manipulus

Binomial name
- Pseudorhabdosynochus manipulus Justine & Sigura, 2007

= Pseudorhabdosynochus manipulus =

Species of flatworm

Pseudorhabdosynochus manipulus is a diplectanid monogenean parasitic on the gills of the malabar grouper, Epinephelus malabaricus. It was first described in 2007.

== Description ==
Pseudorhabdosynochus manipulus is a small monogenean, 0.6 mm in length. The species has the general characteristics of other species of Pseudorhabdosynochus, with a flat body and a posterior haptor, which is the organ by which the monogenean attaches itself to the gill of is host. The haptor bears two squamodiscs, one ventral and one dorsal. The sclerotized male copulatory organ, or "quadriloculate organ", has the shape of a bean with four internal chambers, as in other species of Pseudorhabdosynochus. The vagina includes a sclerotized part, which is a complex structure. In this species, the sclerotised vagina has a cylindrical primary canal and the primary and secondary chambers are both elongate.

== Etymology ==
Pseudorhabdosynochus manipulus is part of a series of six species of Pseudorhabdosynochus, all described from the malabar grouper, Epinephelus malabaricus. The authors indicated that "names of all new species described begin all by ‘ma-’ to provide an easy way to identify these species from E. malabaricus among the numerous species of Pseudorhabdosynochus already described or to be described". The species are P. maaensis, P. malabaricus, P. manifestus, P. manipulus, P. marcellus, and P. maternus. More precisely, for this species, the name ‘manipulus’ (Latin), meaning handful, refers to the small number of specimens found.

== Hosts and localities ==
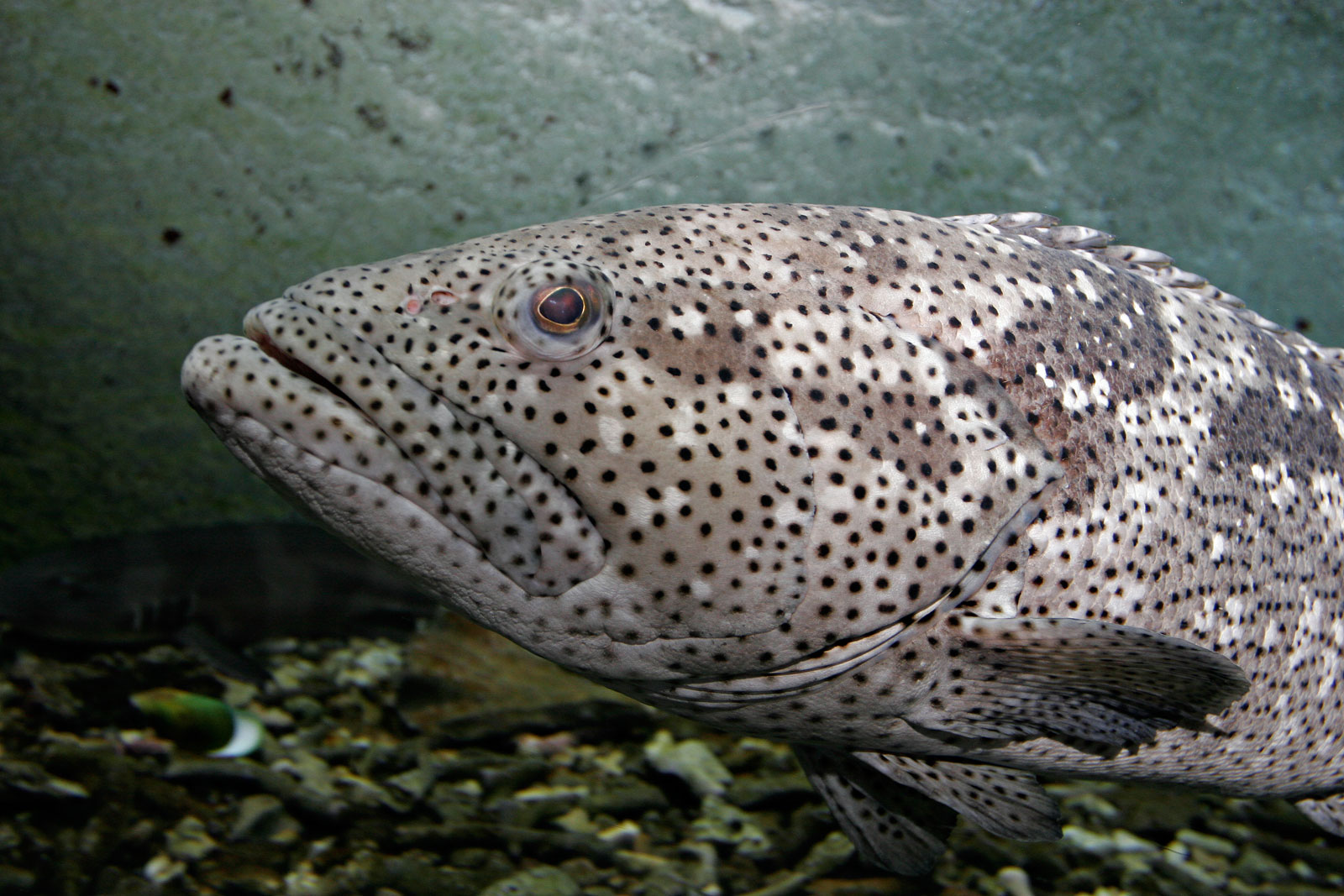
The malabar grouper, Epinephelus malabaricus is the type-host of Pseudorhabdosynochus manipulus

The type-host and only recorded host of P. manipulus is the malabar grouper, Epinephelus malabaricus (Serranidae: Epinephelinae). The type-locality and only recorded locality is off Nouméa, New Caledonia where it was considered a rare species, with only 5% of the specimens collected.
