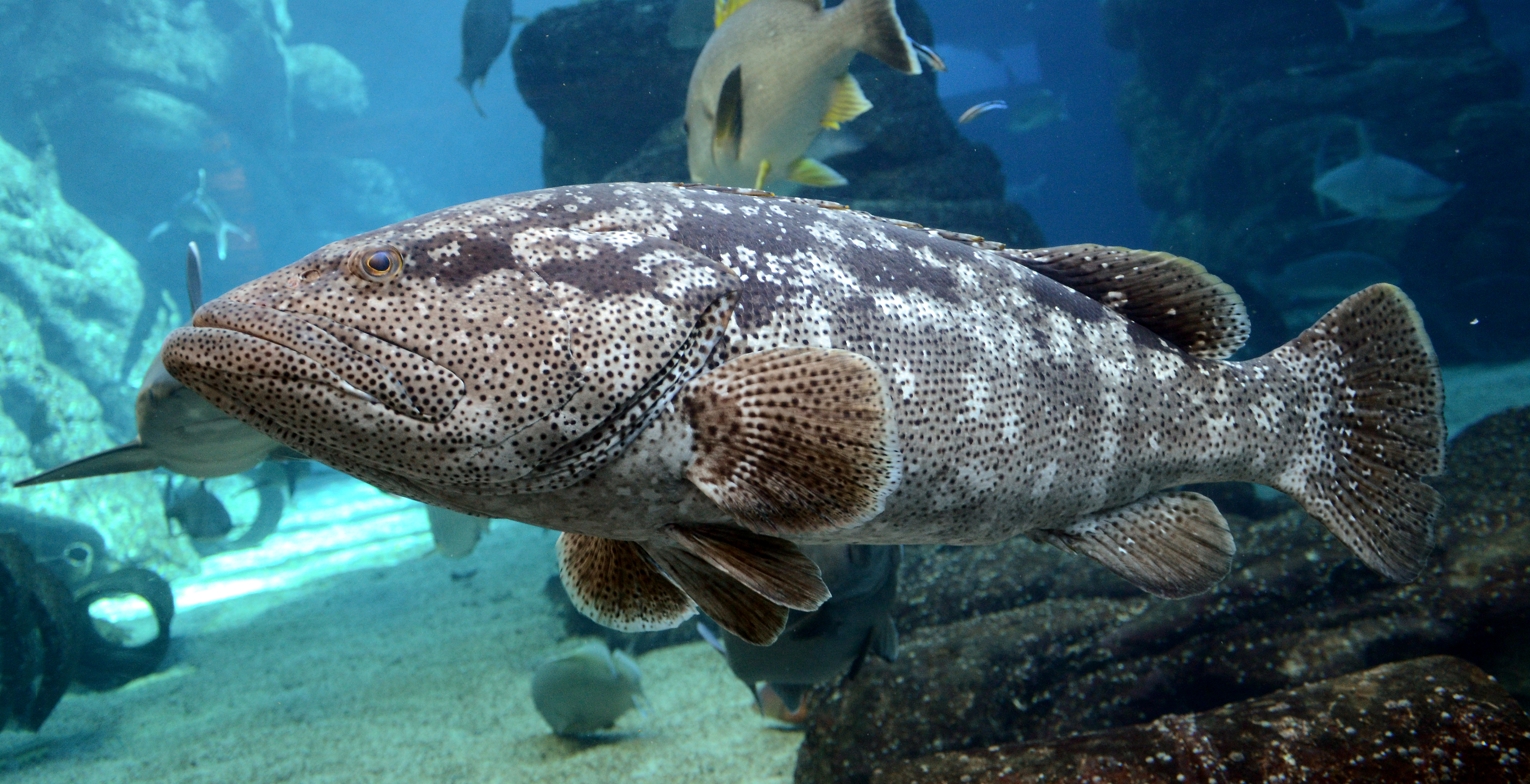
- Epinephelus malabaricus in uShaka Marine World

Conservation status
- Least Concern (IUCN 3.1)

Scientific classification
- Kingdom: Animalia
- Phylum: Chordata
- Class: Actinopterygii
- Order: Perciformes
- Suborder: Percoidei
- Family: Epinephelidae
- Genus: Epinephelus
- Species: E. malabaricus

Binomial name
- Epinephelus malabaricus (Bloch & Schneider, 1801)

Synonyms
- Holocentrus malabaricus Bloch & Schneider, 1801; Cephalopholis malabaricus (Bloch & Schneider, 1801); Holocentrus salmoides Lacépède, 1802; Epinephelus salmoides (Lacépède, 1802); Epinephelus salmonoides (Valenciennes, 1828); Serranus crapao Cuvier, 1829; Serranus polypodophilus Bleeker, 1849; Serranus estuarius Macleay, 1883; Epinephelus cylindricus Postel, 1965

= Malabar grouper =

Species of fish

The Malabar grouper (Epinephelus malabaricus) also known as blackspot rockcod, estuary rockcod, giant rock cod, greasy grouper, Malabar rockcod, Morgan's cod or speckled grouper, is a species of marine ray-finned fish, a grouper from the subfamily Epinephelinae which is part of the family Serranidae, which also includes the anthias and sea basses. It is found in the Indo-Pacific region. It has entered the Mediterranean Sea from the Red Sea by way of the Suez Canal as a Lessepsian migrant.

== Distribution and habitat ==
The Malabar grouper is widespread throughout the tropical waters of the Indo-West Pacific area from the eastern coast of Africa to the Tonga Islands, Red Sea included. It was first recorded in the eastern Mediterranean Sea in 1969 where it remains extremely rare. Mariculture and shipping are possible vectors of introduction. This grouper lives in various habitats, such as lagoons, mangroves, coral and rocky reefs, sandy and muddy bottom areas, between 2 and 150 m deep. The juveniles prefers lagoon or brackish areas.

== Description ==
The Malabar grouper can reach a length up to 234 cm (92 in), but average size is usually around 100 cm (39 in). It has a light grey to light brownish background color, with a number of dark brown spots randomly scattered, which increase in number with age. The body has also a various number of brown diagonal stripes. Younger fish have a number of wide, broken vertical bands of darker shade across their bodies, but in maturity they seem to become a uniform darker colour. Young fish have numerous brown spots. The tail fin is rounded.

== Biology ==
Epinephelus malabaricus is a protogynous hermaphrodite, as these fishes at some point in their lifespan change sex from female to male. Malabar grouper are voracious predators, they feed on fish, crustaceans, and occasionally, cephalopods.

=== Parasites ===
As most fish, the Malabar grouper harbours a variety of parasites, including the diplectanid monogeneans Pseudorhabdosynochus manifestus, P. maaensis, P. malabaricus, P. manipulus, P. marcellus, and P. maternus.

== Uses ==
Malabar groupers are harvested for food, sport, and commercially; some are grown in aquaculture.

== Gallery ==
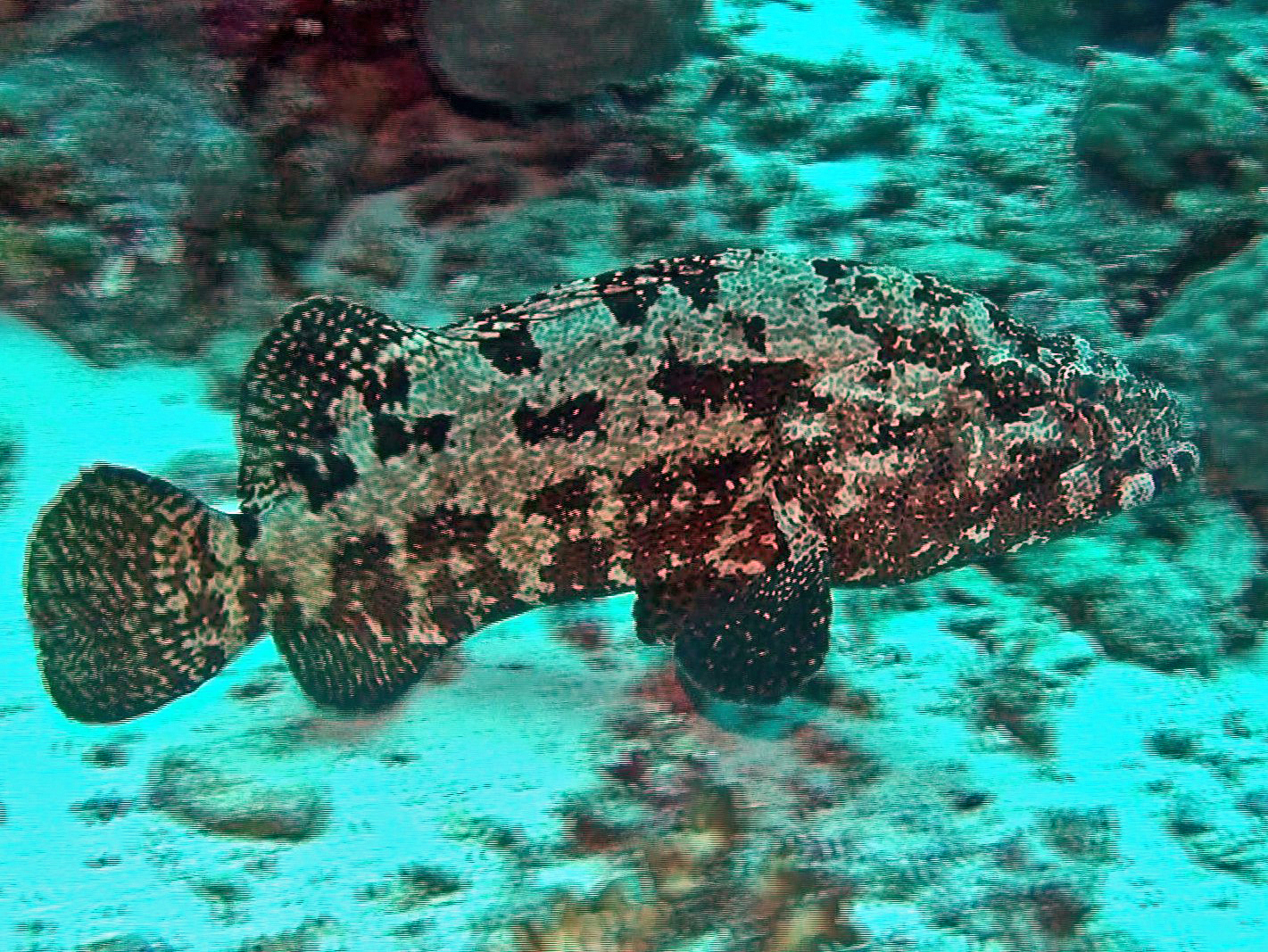
Epinephelus malabaricus from Sudan Coast

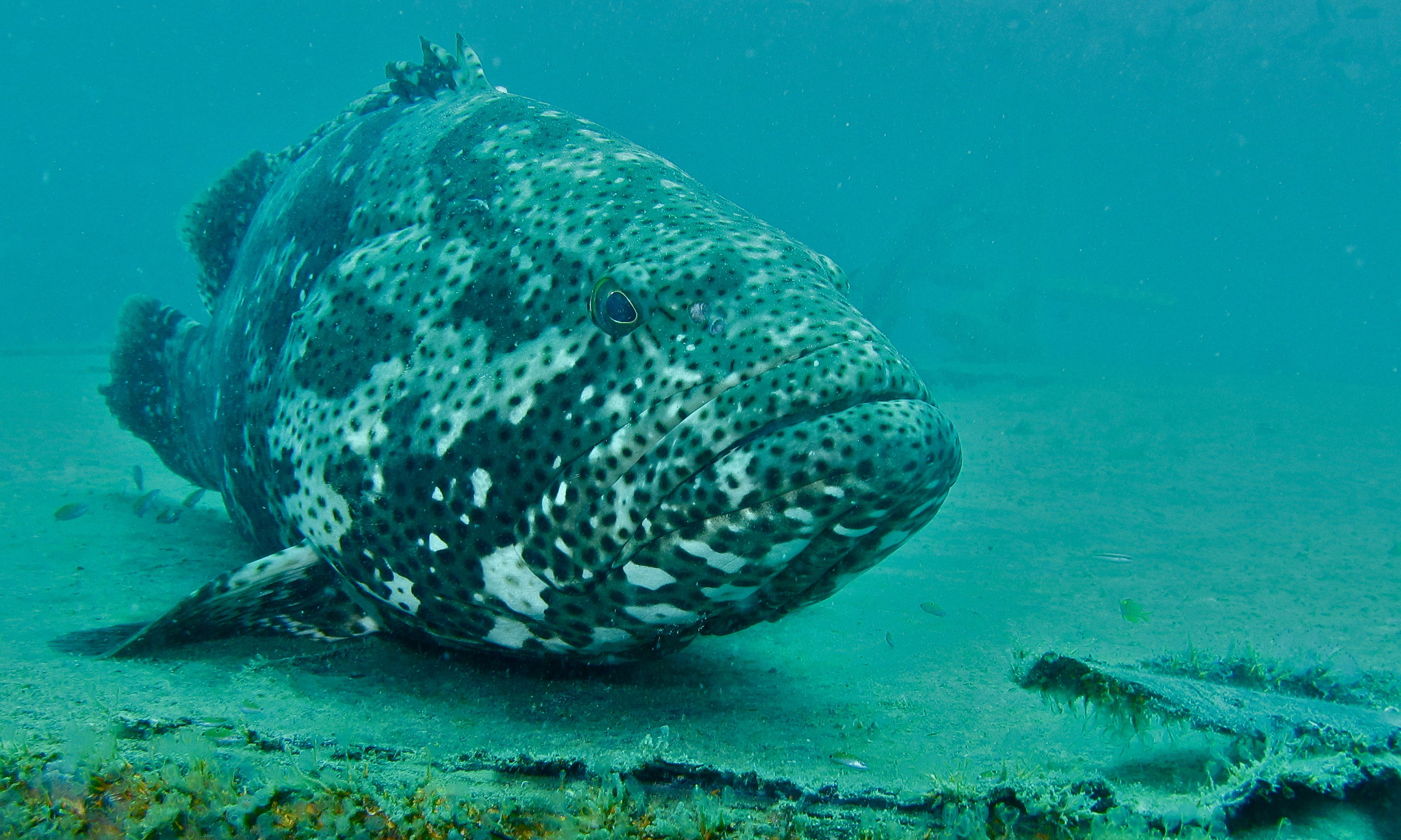
Epinephelus malabaricus from Sabah, Malaysia

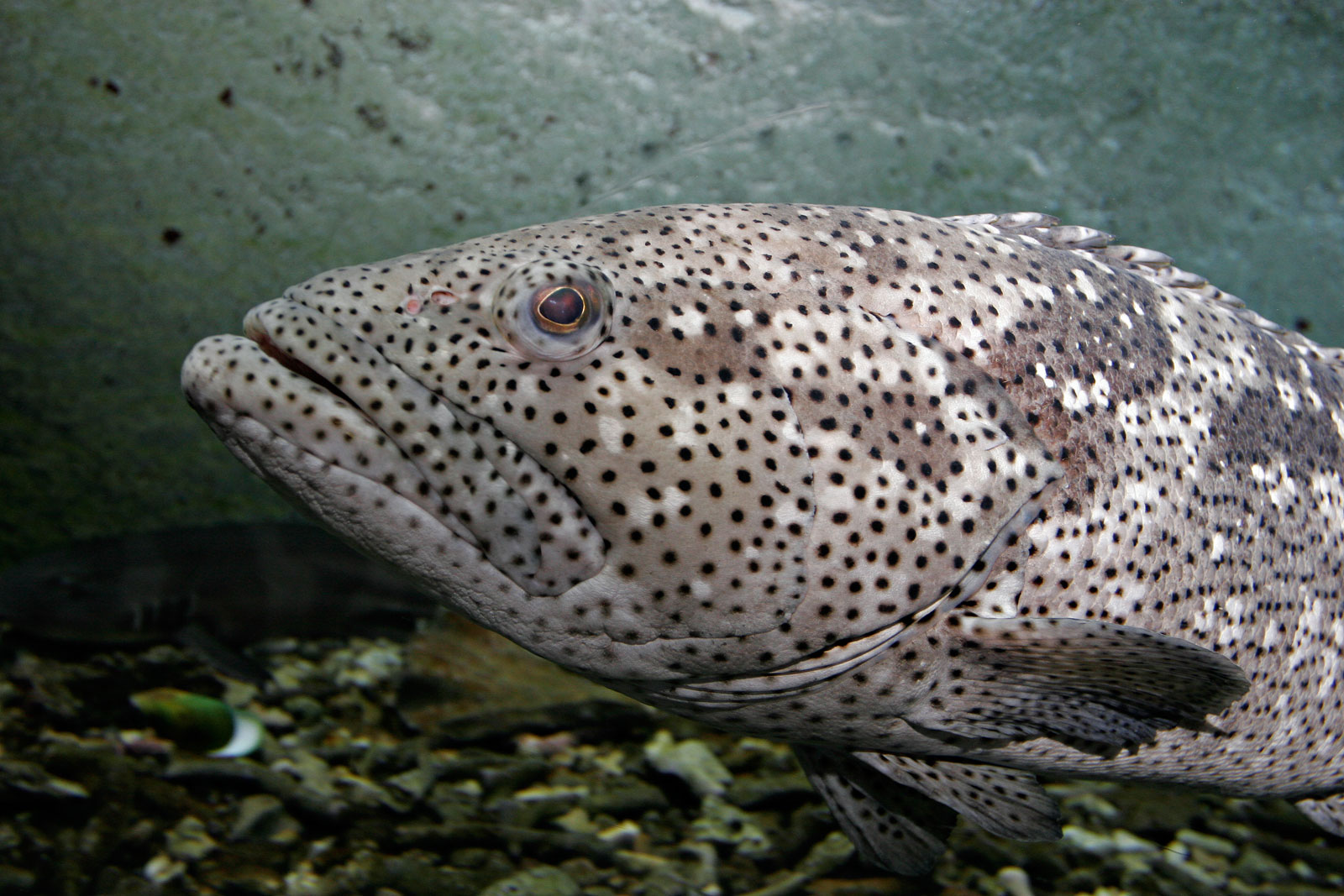
Close-up

Video clip
