= Pseudorhabdosynochus serrani =

Scientific classification
- Kingdom: Animalia
- Phylum: Platyhelminthes
- Class: Monogenea
- Order: Dactylogyridea
- Family: Diplectanidae
- Genus: Pseudorhabdosynochus
- Species: P. serrani

Binomial name
- Pseudorhabdosynochus serrani (Yamaguti, 1953) Kritsky & Beverley-Burton, 1986

Species of worm

Pseudorhabdosynochus serrani is a species of diplectanid monogenean parasitic on the gills of a fish. It was described in 1953 by Satyu Yamaguti as Diplectanum serrani and later transferred to the genus Pseudorhabdosynochus. The species has been redescribed in 2005.

== Description ==
Pseudorhabdosynochus serrani is a small monogenean, 0.3-0.4 mm in length. The species has the general characteristics of other species of Pseudorhabdosynochus, with a flat body and a posterior haptor, which is the organ by which the monogenean attaches itself to the gill of its host. The haptor bears two squamodiscs, one ventral and one dorsal. The sclerotized male copulatory organ, or "quadriloculate organ", has the shape of a bean with four internal chambers, as in other species of Pseudorhabdosynochus. The vagina includes a sclerotized part, which is a complex structure.

== Etymology ==
The etymology of the specific epithet is not explained in the original description but obviously refers to the genus of the host fish, Serranus.

== Hosts and localities ==
The type-locality is off Makassar (Indonesia), and the type-host is an unnamed fish of the genus Serranus. The species has been recorded from wild and maricultured grouper, Epinephelus coioides and Epinephelus bruneus, in Daya Bay, South China Sea.
