= Lamellodisc =

Organ of diplectanid monogeneans

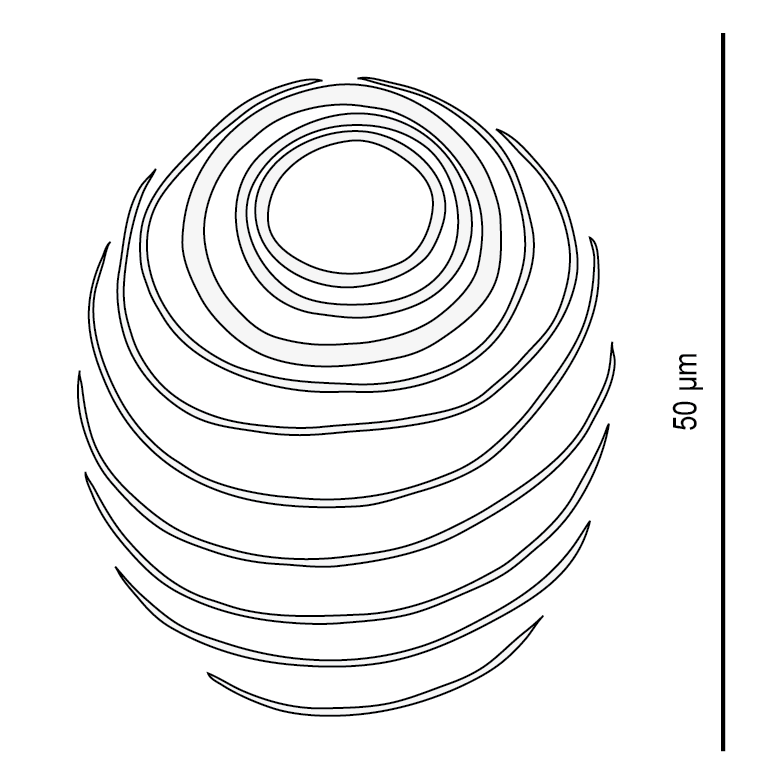
Lamellodisc of the diplectanid Calydiscoides euzeti

Lamellodiscs are epidermal structures, which are typical of and found only in certain monogeneans of the family Diplectanidae. There are, typically, two lamellodiscs, one ventral and one dorsal, located on the haptor of the monogenean. Lamellodiscs are made up of concentric lamellae embedded in the epidermis. Lamellodiscs are considered as special type of squamodiscs, which are homologous structure found in many diplectanid monogeneans but formed of rows of rodlets instead of lamellae.

Lamellodiscs are found in members of the diplectanid genera Lamellodiscus or Calydiscoides. Furnestinia echeneis is peculiar in that it has a single lamellodisc, not two.
