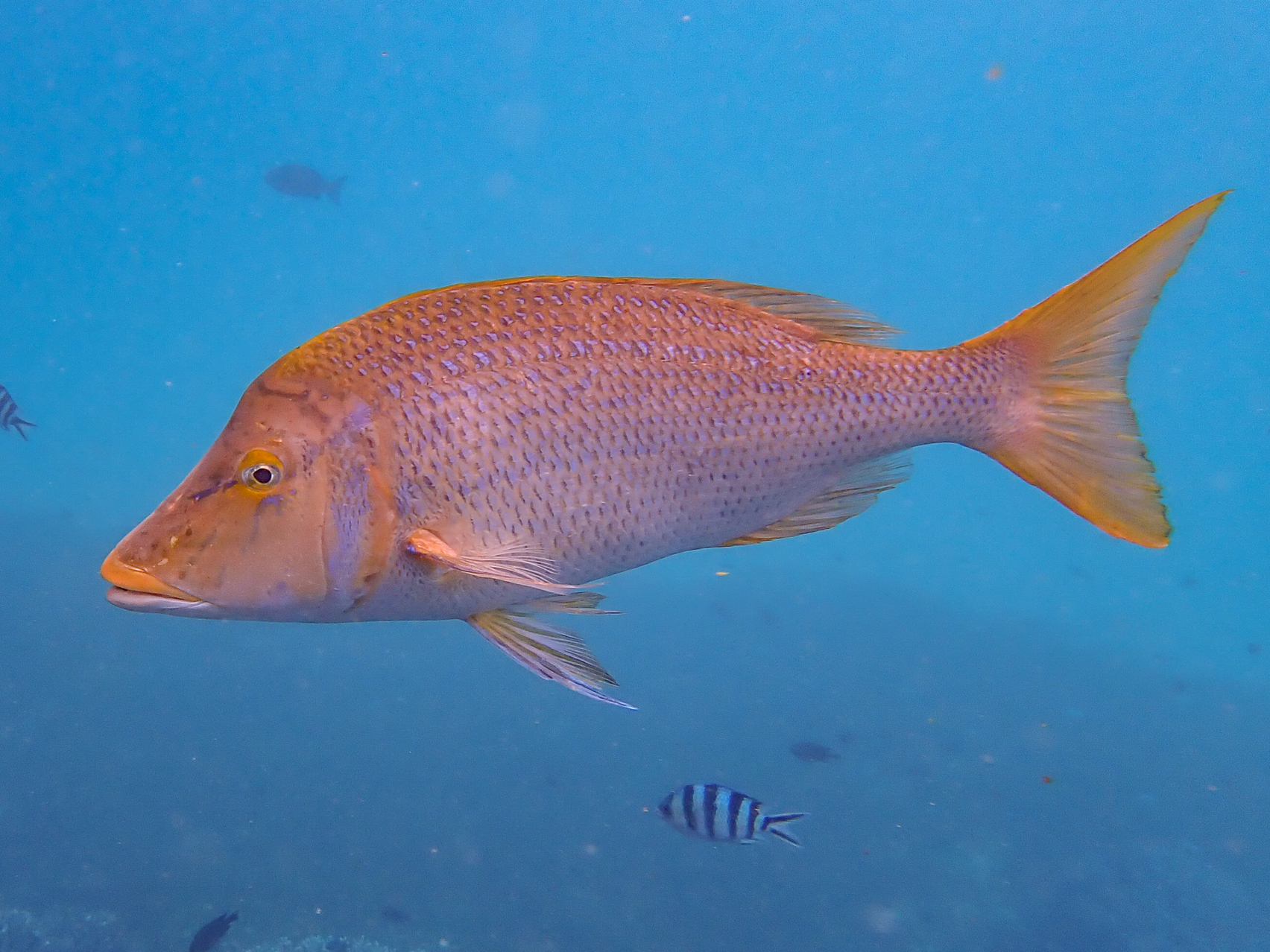
- At Lord Howe Island

Conservation status
- Least Concern (IUCN 3.1)

Scientific classification
- Kingdom: Animalia
- Phylum: Chordata
- Class: Actinopterygii
- Division: Teleostei
- Order: Acanthuriformes
- Family: Lethrinidae
- Genus: Lethrinus
- Species: L. nebulosus

Binomial name
- Lethrinus nebulosus (Forsskål, 1775)

Synonyms
- List: Sciaena nebulosa Forsskål, 1775; Sparus choerorynchus Bloch & Schneider, 1801; Lethrinus choerorynchus (Bloch & Schneider, 1801); Lethrinus maculatus Valenciennes, 1830; Lethrinus erythrurus Valenciennes, 1830; Lethrinus gothofredi Valenciennes, 1830; Lethrinus korely Valenciennes, 1830; Lethrinus centurio Valenciennes, 1830; Lethrinus esculentus Valenciennes, 1830; Lethrinus karwa Valenciennes, 1830; Lethrinus alboguttatus Valenciennes, 1830; Lethrinus fasciatus Valenciennes, 1830; Lethrinus fraenatus Valenciennes, 1830; Lethrinus cyanoxanthus Richardson, 1843; Lethrinus anatarius Richardson, 1845; Lethrinus guentheri Bleeker, 1873; Lethrinus aurolineatus Macleay, 1882; Lethrinus carinatus Weber, 1913; Lethrinus devisianus Whitley, 1929; Lethrinus perselectus Whitley, 1933

= Lethrinus nebulosus =

Species of fish

Lethrinus nebulosus, the spangled emperor, green snapper, morwong, north-west snapper, sand bream, sand snapper, sixteen-pounder, sharie, sheri and yellow sweetlip, is a species of marine ray-finned fish belonging to the family Lethrinidae, the emperors and emperor breams. This species is found the Indo-West Pacific region.

== Taxonomy ==
Lethrinus nebulosus was first formally described as Sciaena nebulosa by the Swedish-speaking Finnish explorer, orientalist, naturalist Peter Forsskål and published in 1775 in Descriptiones animalium edited by Carsten Niebuhr with no Type locality being given but it is assumed to be the Red Sea. In 2022 the population of this species found off the coast of Southern Africa south of northern KwaZulu-Natal was recognised as a valid separate species from L. nebulosus, Lethrinus scoparius. Some authors place the genus Lethrinus in the monotypic subfamily Lethrininae, with all the other genera of Lethrinidae placed in the Monotaxinae, however, the 5th edition of Fishes of the World does not recognise the subfamilies traditionally accepted within the family Lethrinidae as valid. The family Lethrinidae is classified by the 5th edition of Fishes of the World as belonging to the order Spariformes.

== Etymology ==
Lethrinus nebulosus has the specific name nebulosus which means "cloudy", Forsskål described it as having "longitudinal clouds of blue and yellow-brown" which is thought to be an allusion to the irregular dark bars that sometimes appear on its flanks.

== Distribution ==
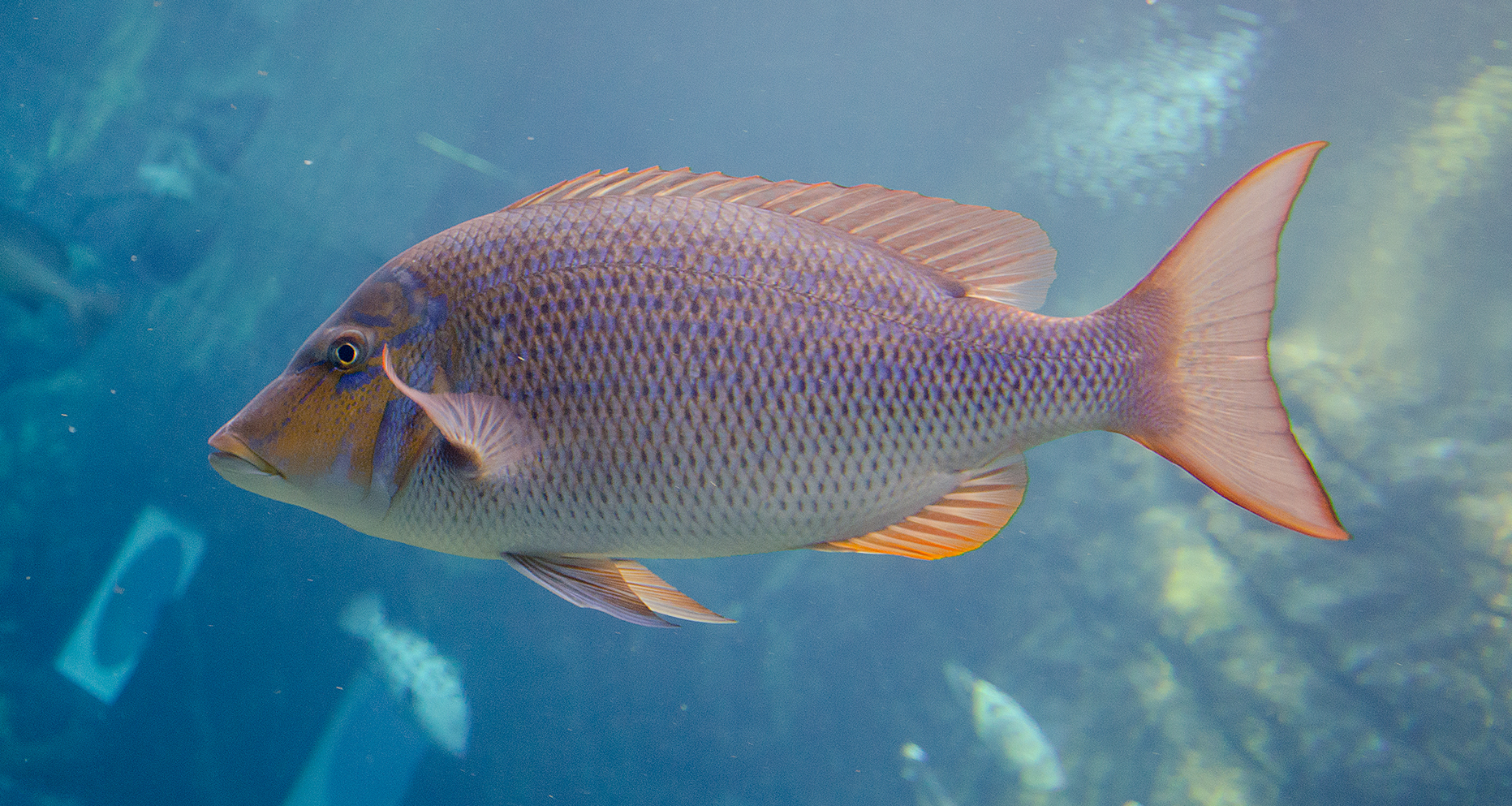
At uShaka Marine World

This fish occurs in the waters of East Africa to the southern parts of Japan. It also lives in Australian coastal waters, and has been recorded in the Red Sea, Persian Gulf and New Caledonia, where it is one of the major commercial fish.

== Habitat ==
Lethrinus nebulosus inhabits both marine and brackish waters at depths of between 10 and 75 metres. It is a non-migratory species, and is found on coral and rocky reefs, seagrass beds, mangrove swamps, as well as over sandy substrates. Juveniles may be found in large schools.

== Description ==
This species commonly grows to approximately 70 cm in length, however the largest individuals have been found to be 87 cm.^{[clarification needed]} It is yellow to yellowish-brown or bronze in colour, the belly being lighter. It has scattered blue markings over the body. The cheeks have no scales and may have a vertical blue markings. It has whitish or yellowish fins with a yellowish-edged dorsal fin.

== Diet ==
This species feeds mainly on mollusks, echinoderms, and crustaceans. It also eats polychaetes and other fish, but less commonly.

== As food ==
Lethrinus nebulosus is sought after by recreational fishers and is considered to be delicious.

== Parasites ==
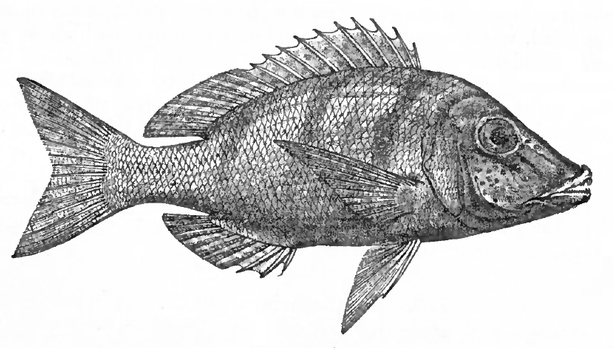
1889 illustration

As with most fish, Lethrinus nebulosus is the host of many species of parasites. Monogeneans parasitic on the gills include the diplectanids Calydiscoides difficilis, Calydiscoides duplicostatus and Calydiscoides terpsichore, an ancyrocephalid, and an unidentified polyopisthocotylean. The pharyngeal teeth harbour a species of the capsalid monogenean Encotyllabe which is specialised to this special habitat. Copepods parasitic on the gills include three species of the hatschekiid Hatschekia including Hatschekia gracilis. The digestive tract harbours the opecoelid Macvicaria macassarensis and the zoogonid Diphterostomum tropicum.

In New Caledonia, where its parasites were studied, Lethrinus nebulosus has a total of eleven species of parasites.

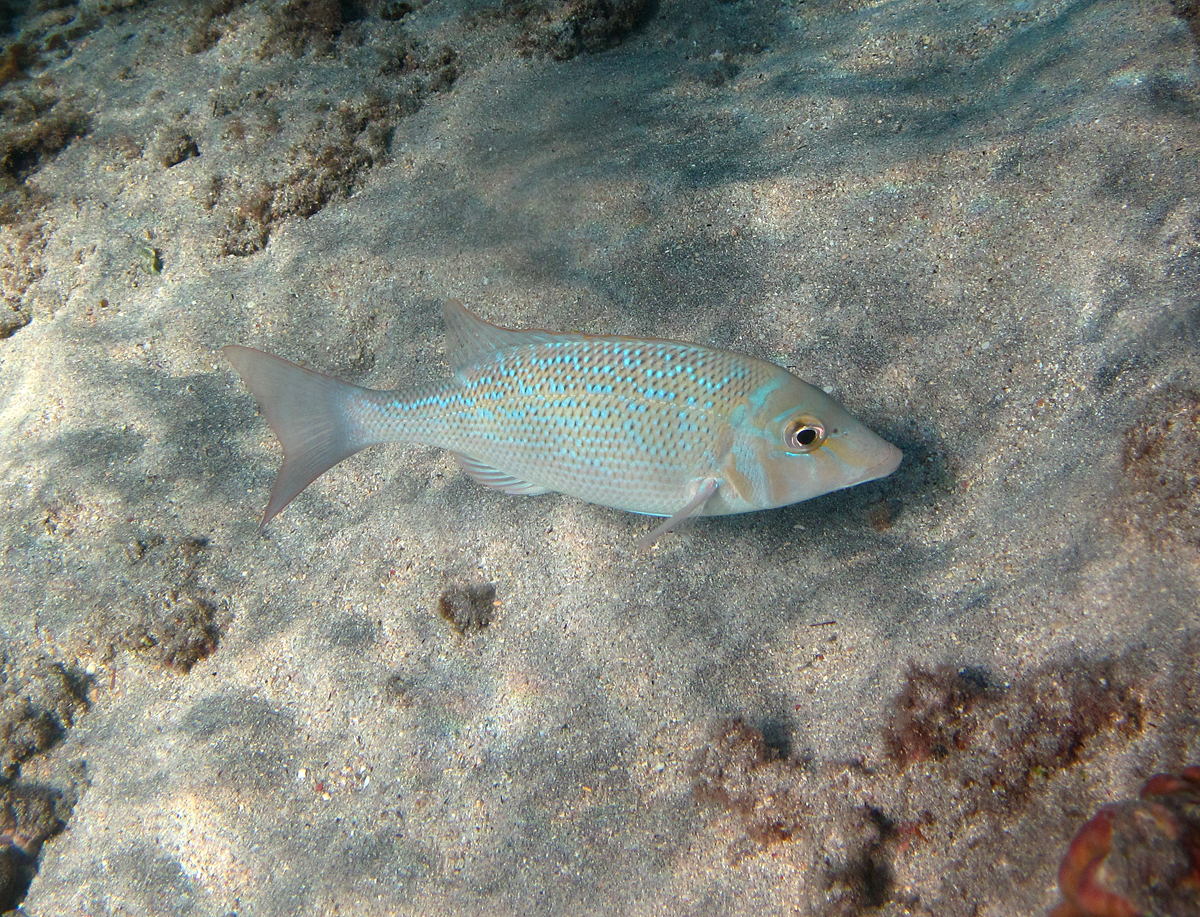
Lethrinus nebulosus

== Distribution and population ==
Spangled Emperor are a very commonly found fish in many locations. They can be found around East Africa, Japan, Australia, the Persian Gulf and the Red Sea. They usually inhabit waters 20-300 meters deep, but can be found shallower, more commonly near structure.

Being a good eating fish, over exploitation of this species has significantly decreased the population especially in the Persian Gulf, where the development of Emirati fishing vessels has considerably decreased the amount of 'Sheri' or 'Sherry' caught. However, it is still being caught at near sustainable numbers, and its offshore populations remain of lower concern. Around 3000 tons of Lethrinus nebulosus is caught every year around the Persian Gulf.
