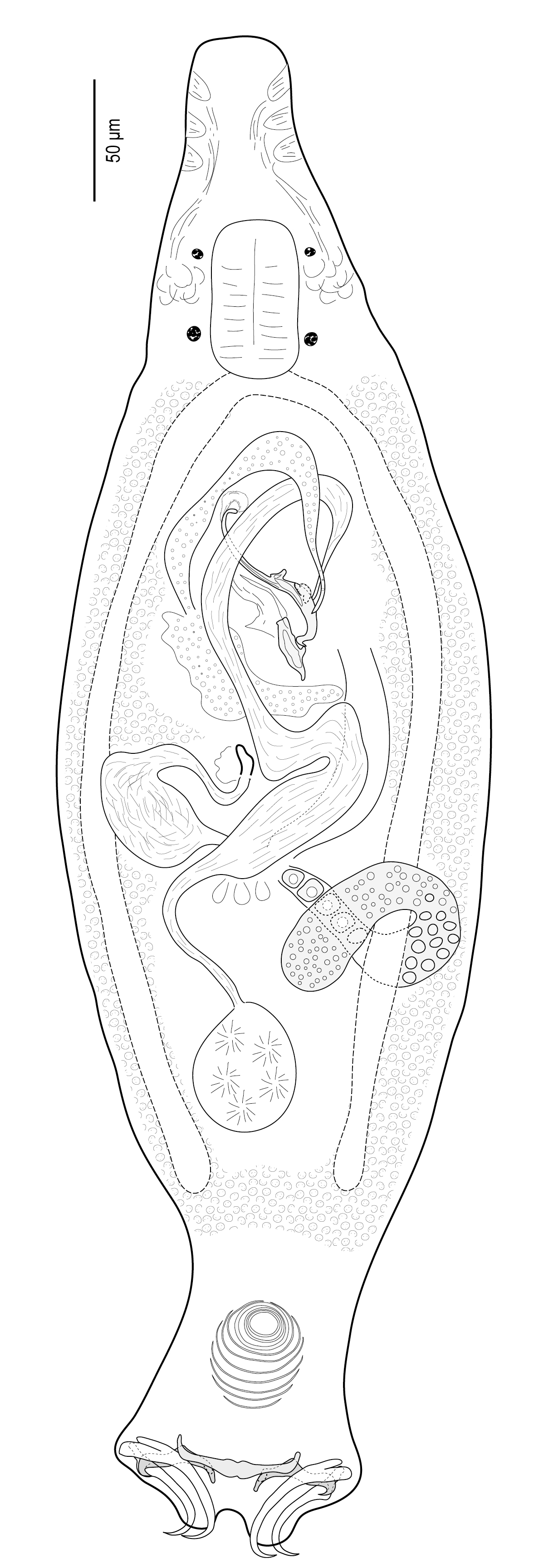
- Calydiscoides euzeti Justine, 2007

Scientific classification
- Kingdom: Animalia
- Phylum: Platyhelminthes
- Class: Monogenea
- Order: Dactylogyridea
- Family: Diplectanidae
- Genus: Calydiscoides
- Species: C. euzeti

Binomial name
- Calydiscoides euzeti Justine, 2007

= Calydiscoides euzeti =

Species of flatworm

Calydiscoides euzeti is a species of monogenean of the family Diplectanidae.

As all members of the family Diplectanidae, it has a single posterior testis and a single ovary that wraps the lateral caecum of the intestine. As all members of the genus Calydiscoides, it is characterized by the presence of lamellodiscs, which are specialized attachment organs made up of concentric lamellae, on the posterior part of its body.
The species is distinguished from other species of the genus Calydiscoides by the shape and size of its male copulatory organ, which is elongate in shape with an anterior curved whip, and 70–83 μm in length.

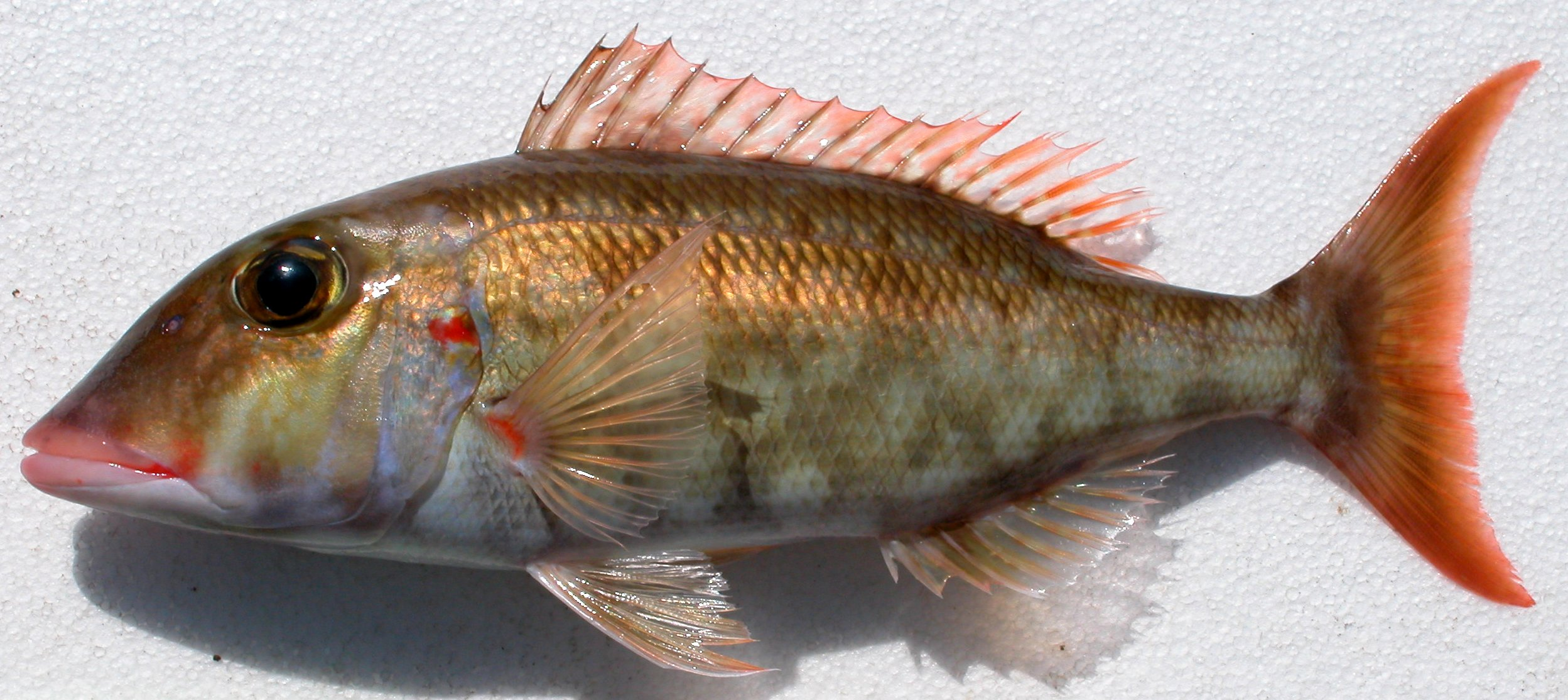
Spotcheek emperor, Lethrinus rubrioperculatus, the host fish of Calydiscoides euzeti off New Caledonia

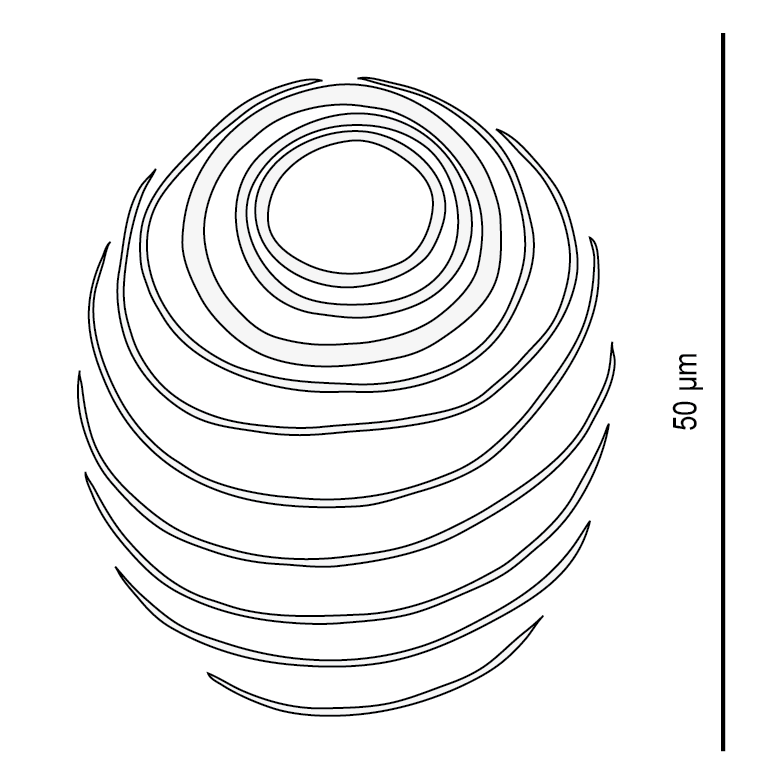
Lamellodisc of Calydiscoides euzeti

It is ectoparasite on the gills of two species of marine fish, emperors, namely the spotcheek emperor Lethrinus rubrioperculatus and the Yellowlip emperor Lethrinus xanthochilus. It has been found off New Caledonia, in the South Pacific Ocean.

The name of the species, euzeti, means that it was named in honour of Professor Louis Euzet, a famous French parasitologist.
