= Squamodisc =

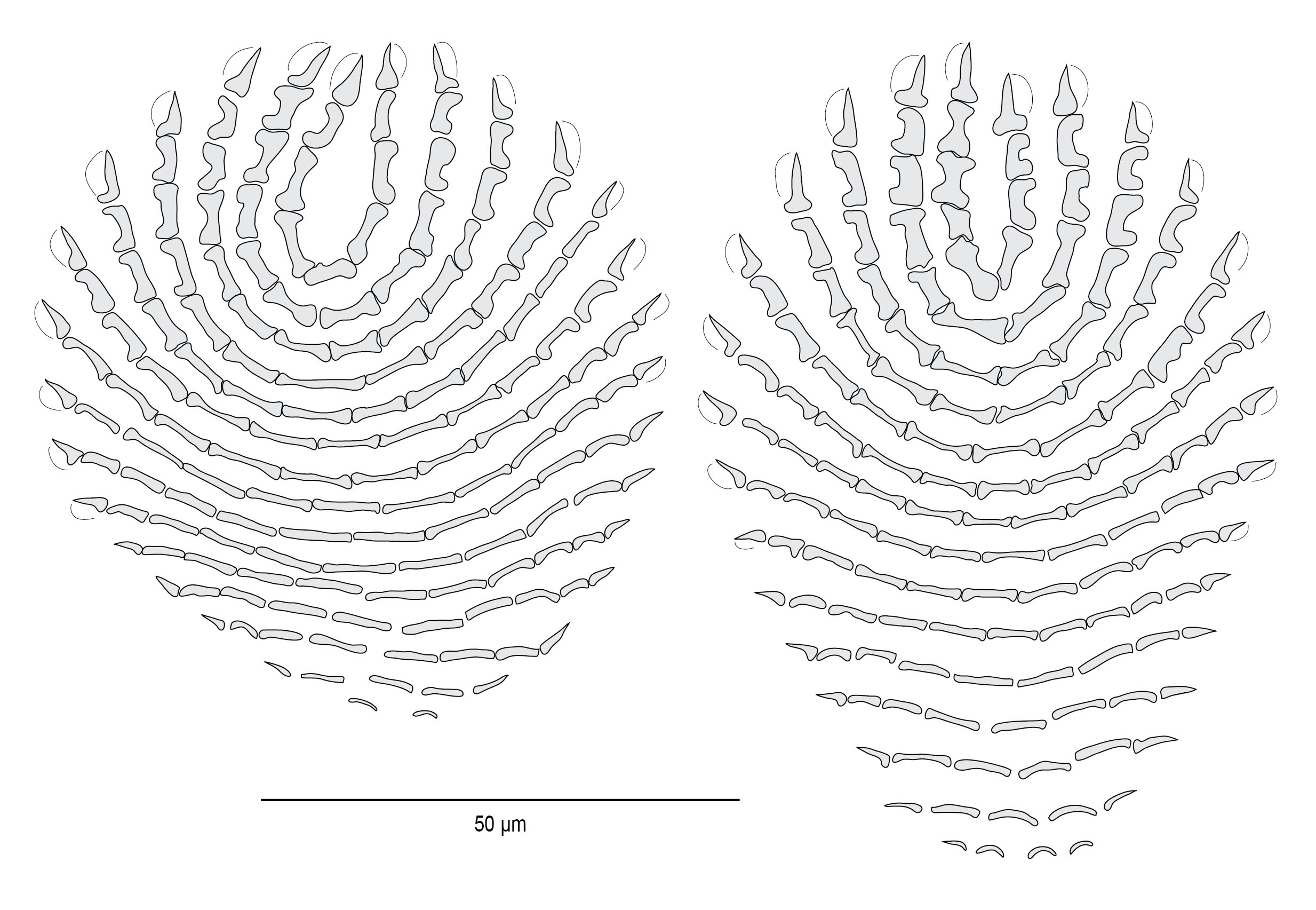
Squamodiscs of the diplectanid Pseudorhabdosynochus epinepheli. Left, ventral squamodisc; right, dorsal squamodisc.

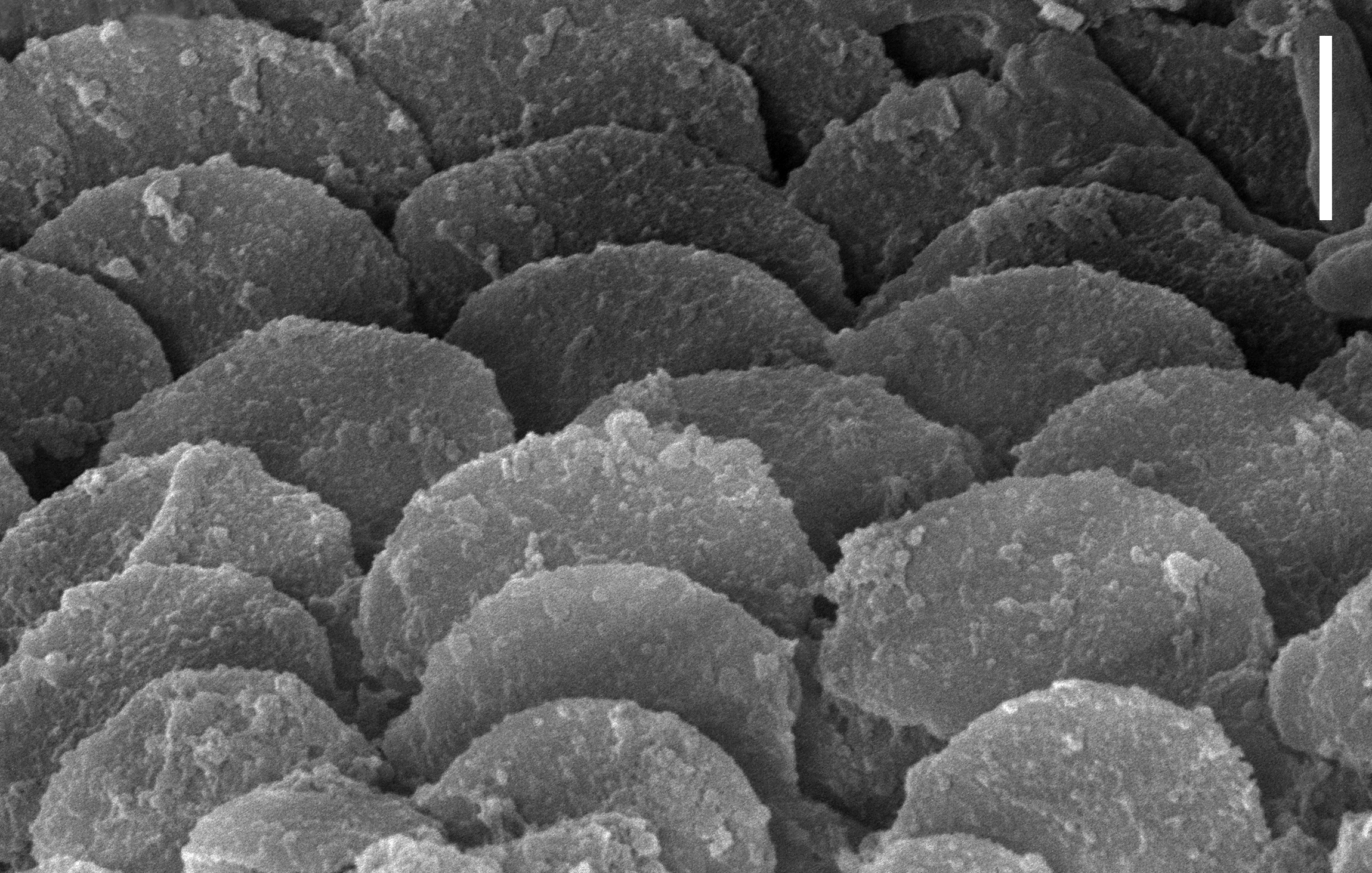
Scanning electron microscopy of the scales in the squamodisc of the diplectanid Pseudorhabdosynochus jeanloui Bar: 2 μm.

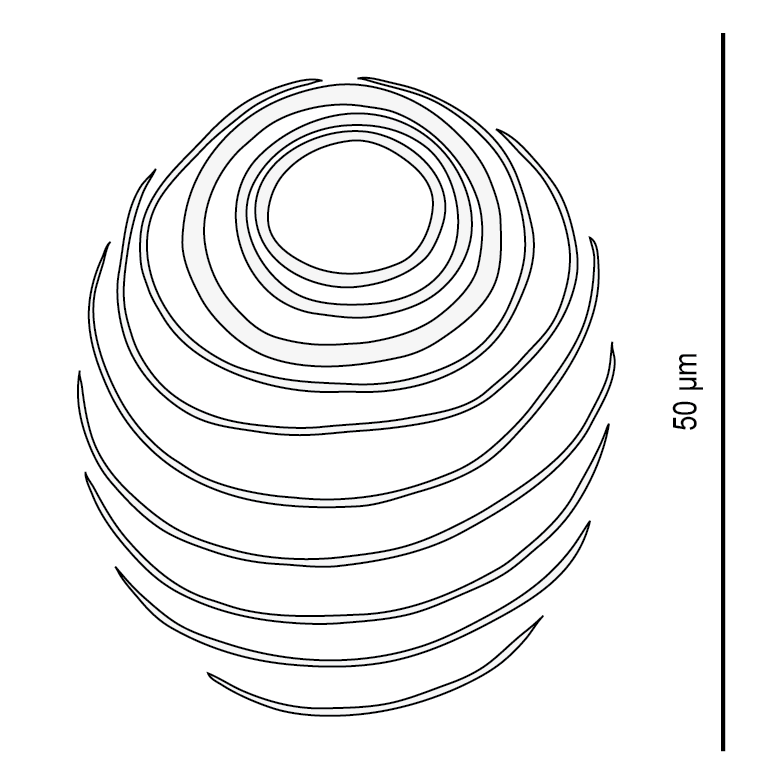
Lamellodisc of the diplectanid Calydiscoides euzeti

Squamodiscs are epidermal structures, which are typical of and found only in certain monogeneans of the family Diplectanidae. There are, typically, two squamodiscs, one ventral and one dorsal, located on the haptor of the monogenean. Squamodiscs are usually made up of scales embedded in the epidermis, which appear from the outside as rodlets arranged in rows.

According to the classical book of Bychowsky (1967), “the Diplectanidae] have special paired attaching formations lying above the disc and also partially on it, on the dorsal and ventral sides in the shape of small rounded convexities equipped with numerous [...] thorn-shaped little hooks or thin thread-like plates located more or less in concentric rows ("squamodisc")".

Ultrastructural studies of squamodiscs have shown that they include epidermally-embedded spines which are covered by the outer epidermal membrane. The spines are composed of a moderately electron-dense material with denser fibrils embedded within it.

A diplectanid genus Squamodiscus Yamaguti, 1934 was created but is now considered a synonym of Diplectanum Diesing, 1858.

Some diplectanids, such as members of the genera Lamellodiscus or Calydiscoides, have a similar structure which is composed of lamellae, not rodlets; in this case the structure is called a lamellodisc.
