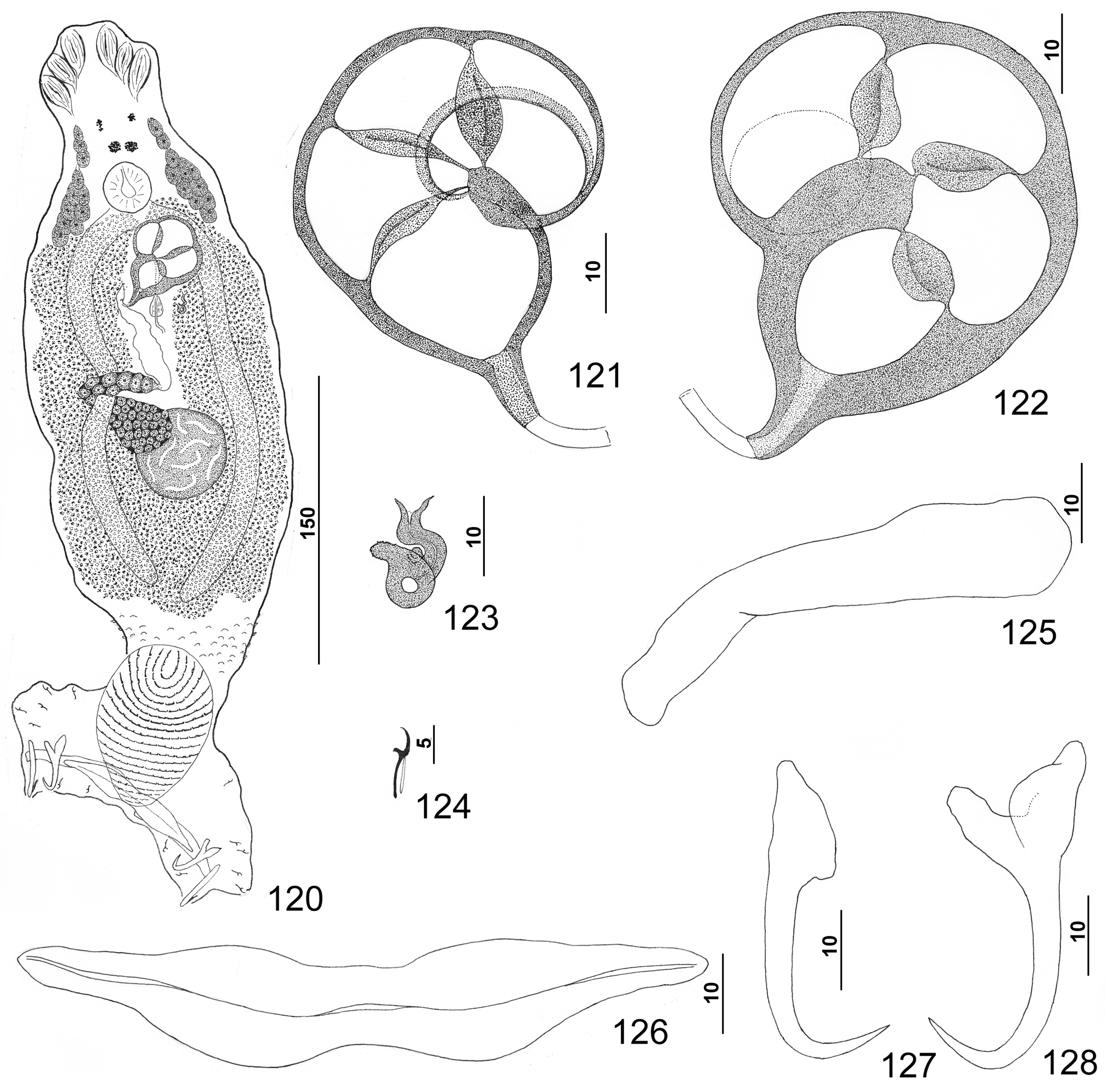
- Body and sclerotised parts

Scientific classification
- Kingdom: Animalia
- Phylum: Platyhelminthes
- Class: Monogenea
- Order: Dactylogyridea
- Family: Diplectanidae
- Genus: Pseudorhabdosynochus
- Species: P. williamsi

Binomial name
- Pseudorhabdosynochus williamsi Kritsky, Bakenhaster & Adams, 2015

= Pseudorhabdosynochus williamsi =

Species of flatworm

Pseudorhabdosynochus williamsi is a diplectanid monogenean parasitic on the gills of the rock hind, Epinephelus adscensionis. It has been described by Kritsky, Bakenhaster and Adams in 2015.

== Description ==
Pseudorhabdosynochus williamsi is a small monogenean, half a millimetre in length. The species has the general characteristics of other species of Pseudorhabdosynochus, with a flat body and a posterior haptor, which is the organ by which the monogenean attaches itself to the gill of is host. The haptor bears two squamodiscs, one ventral and one dorsal. The sclerotized male copulatory organ, or "quadriloculate organ", has the shape of a bean with four internal chambers, as in other species of Pseudorhabdosynochus. The vagina includes a sclerotized part, which is a complex structure.

== Etymology ==
According to Kritsky, Bakenhaster & Adams (2015), Pseudorhabdosynochus williamsi was named for Dr. Ernest (Bert) H. Williams Jr., professor (retired), University of Puerto Rico, Lajas, Puerto Rico, in recognition of his extensive research on the parasites of fishes in the Caribbean region. Dr. Williams was one of the investigators who collected the voucher specimen (a paratype of P. monaensis) of this species from rock hind in Puerto Rico.

== Diagnosis ==
Kritsky, Bakenhaster & Adams (2015) wrote that Pseudorhabdosynochus williamsi differs from P. monaensis by possessing a small male copulatory organ (about 51 μm in P. williamsi vs. 121 μm in P. monaensis), and dorsal bars with a minimally expanded medial end (medial end of dorsal bar about twice as wide as the proximal end in P. monaensis). P. williamsi most closely resembles P. justinella and P. meganmarieae based on the comparative morphology of the respective vaginal sclerites. It differs from P. justinella by having a delicate cone of the male copulatory organ(cone robust in P. justinella) and a ventral bar with a moderately constricted medial region (constriction minimal in P. justinella). It differs from P. meganmarieae by the minimally expanded medial end of the dorsal bars (medial end of dorsal bar about twice as wide as the distal end in P. meganmarieae) and by having the shaft of the ventral anchor forming a gentle arc (shaft comparatively straight in P. meganmarieae).

== Hosts and localities ==
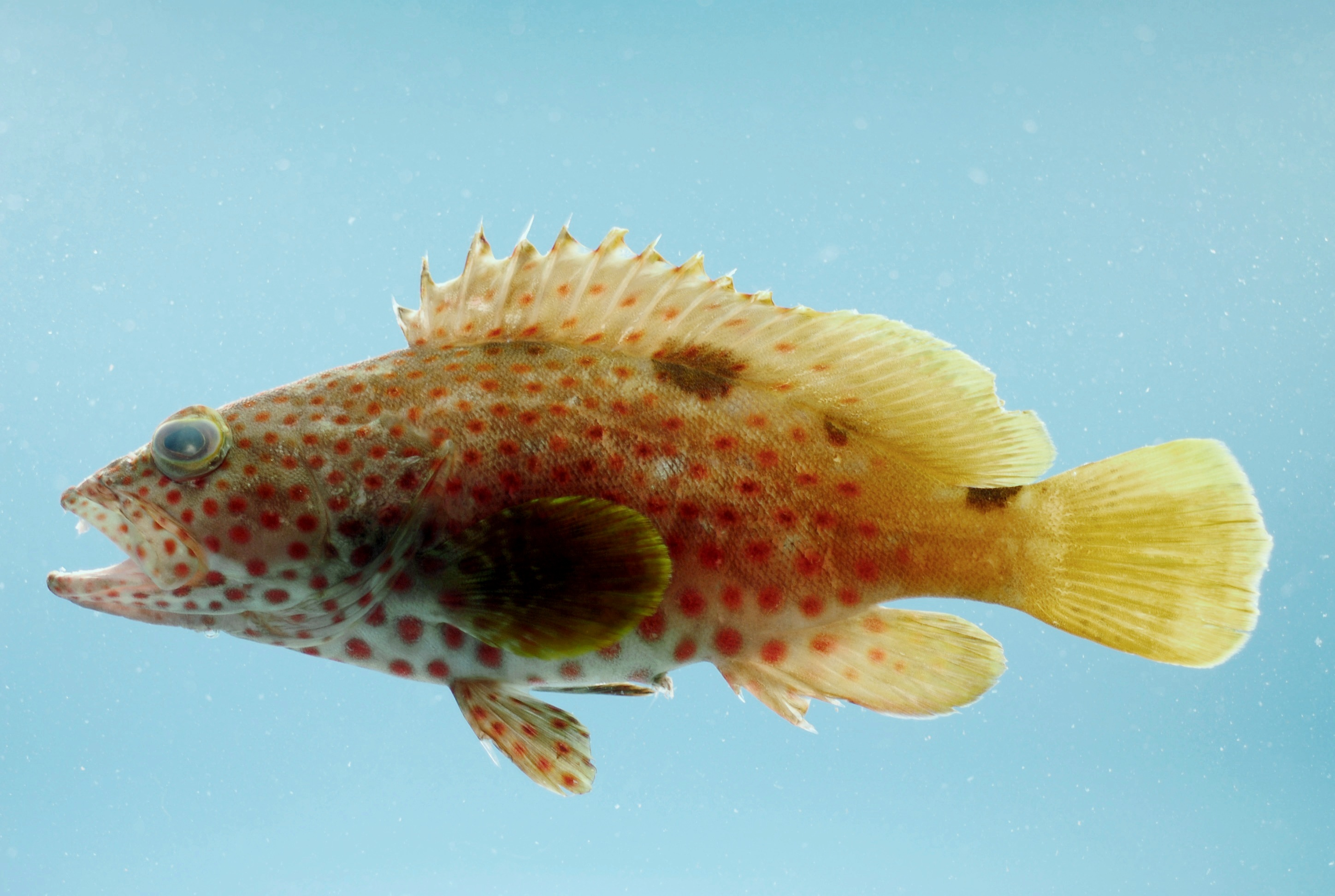
The rock hind, Epinephelus adscensionis is the type-host of Pseudorhabdosynochus williamsi

The type-host and only recorded host of P. williamsi is the rock hind, Epinephelus adscensionis (Serranidae: Epinephelinae). The type-locality and only locality is ca 40 miles offshore from St. Andrews Bay, Panama City, Florida.
