= Pseudorhabdosynochus mizellei =

- Body and sclerotised parts

Scientific classification
- Kingdom: Animalia
- Phylum: Platyhelminthes
- Class: Monogenea
- Order: Dactylogyridea
- Family: Diplectanidae
- Genus: Pseudorhabdosynochus
- Species: P. mizellei

Binomial name
- Pseudorhabdosynochus mizellei Kritsky, Bakenhaster & Adams, 2015

Species of flatworm

Pseudorhabdosynochus mizellei is a diplectanid monogenean parasitic on the gills of the red hind, Epinephelus guttatus. It has been described by Kritsky, Bakenhaster and Adams in 2015. The species was named Diplectanum epinepheli by Mizelle & Wood but this name was not published and is a nomen nudum according to Kritsky, Bakenhaster & Adams (2015).

== Description ==
Pseudorhabdosynochus mizellei is a small monogenean, 316–437 μm in length. The species has the general characteristics of other species of Pseudorhabdosynochus, with a flat body and a posterior haptor, which is the organ by which the monogenean attaches itself to the gill of is host. The haptor bears two squamodiscs, one ventral and one dorsal. The sclerotized male copulatory organ, or "quadriloculate organ", has the shape of a bean with four internal chambers, as in other species of Pseudorhabdosynochus. The vagina includes a sclerotized part, which is a complex structure.

== Etymology ==
According to Kritsky, Bakenhaster & Adams (2015), Pseudorhabdosynochus mizellei was named for the late Dr. John D. Mizelle, mentor of the senior author (Delane Kritsky) and codiscoverer of this new species in Bermuda, in recognition of his extensive research on Monogeneans occurring in North and South America.

== Diagnosis ==
According to Kritsky, Bakenhaster & Adams (2015), Pseudorhabdosynochus mizellei most closely resembles P. williamsi in the basic morphology of the vaginal sclerite and male copulatory organ. In both species, the sclerite has small chambers and the cone of the male copulatory organ is elongate. P. mizellei is easily differentiated from P. williamsi by the deep root of the ventral anchor being shorter than the superficial root and the shaft of the dorsal anchor forming a gentle curve (vs dorsal-anchor shaft comparatively straight in P. williamsi). In addition, the ventral and dorsal bars of P. mizellei are noticeably shorter than those of P. williamsi. P. mizellei differs from P. woodi by having a comparatively small vaginal sclerite with two small chambers. The vaginal sclerite of P. woodi has a larger single ovate chamber.

== Hosts and localities ==
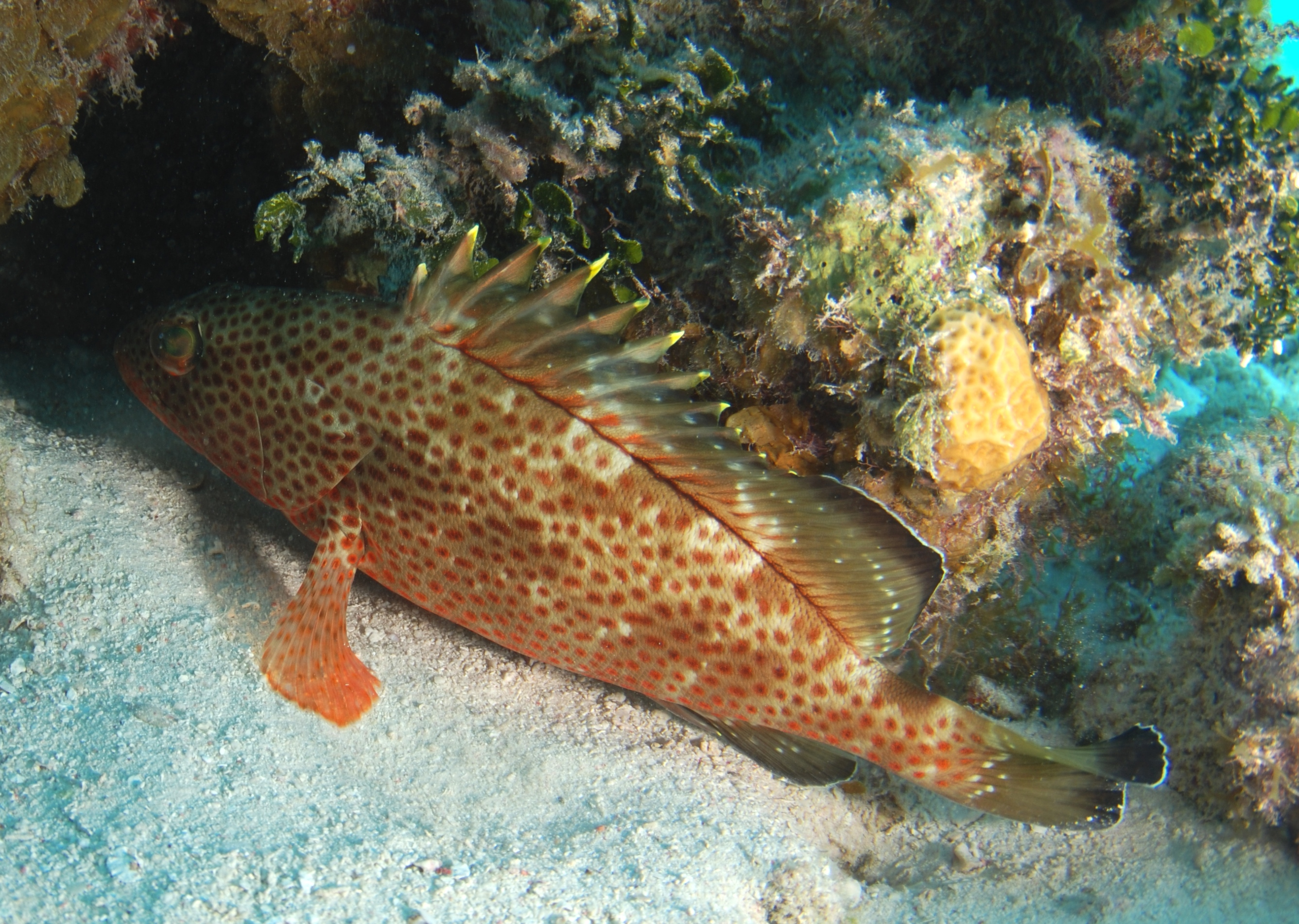
The red hind, Epinephelus guttatus is the type-host of Pseudorhabdosynochus mizellei

The type-host and only recorded host of P. mizellei is the red hind, Epinephelus guttatus (Serranidae: Epinephelinae). The type-locality is Florida Middle Grounds, Gulf of Mexico. Other localities include Open Gulf of Mexico, 17 km SSW of Loggerhead Key, Florida; 70 miles W of Key West, Florida; offshore, Marathon, Florida; off Castle Roads, Bermuda.
