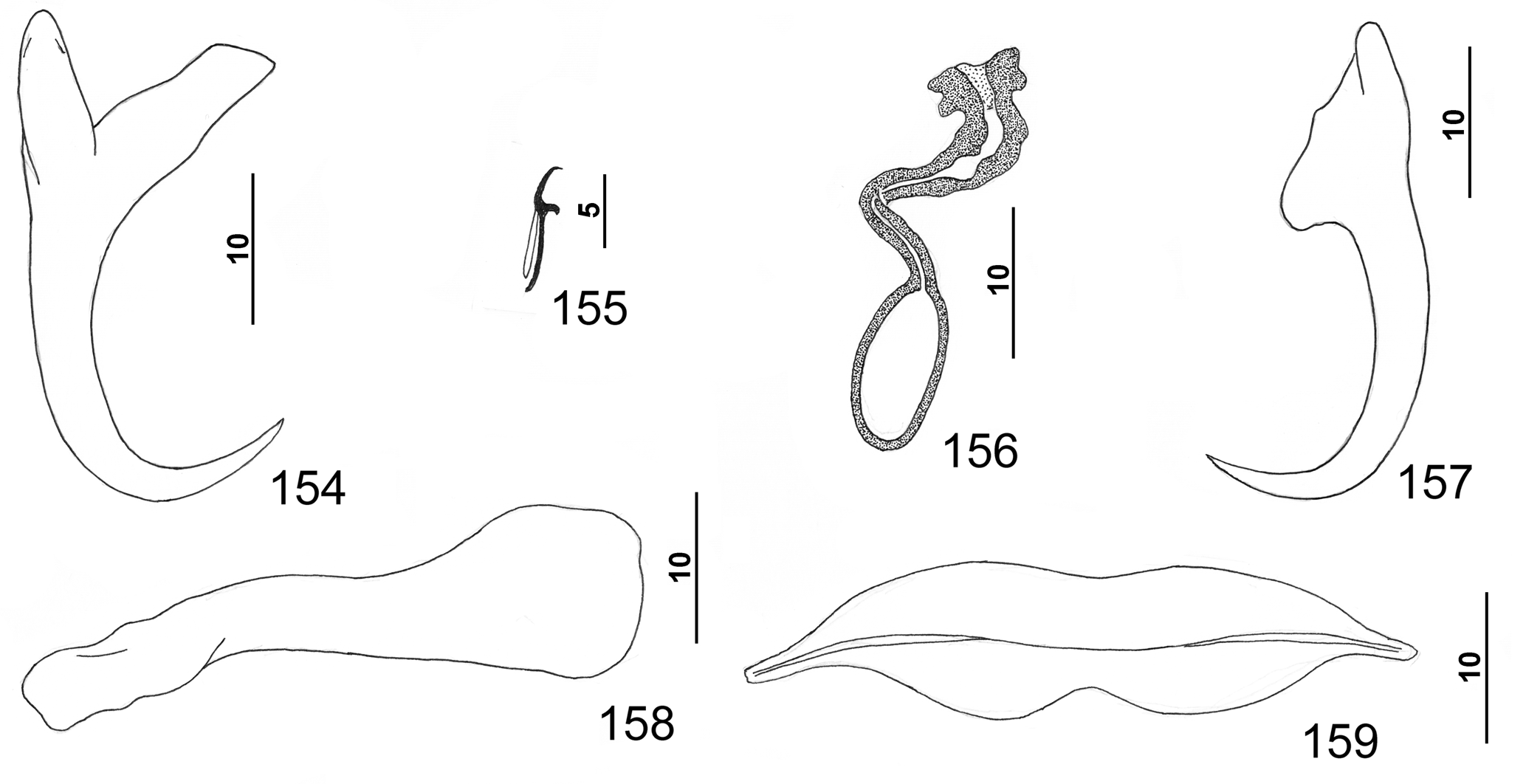
- Sclerotised parts

Scientific classification
- Kingdom: Animalia
- Phylum: Platyhelminthes
- Class: Monogenea
- Order: Dactylogyridea
- Family: Diplectanidae
- Genus: Pseudorhabdosynochus
- Species: P. woodi

Binomial name
- Pseudorhabdosynochus woodi Kritsky, Bakenhaster & Adams, 2015

= Pseudorhabdosynochus woodi =

Species of flatworm

Pseudorhabdosynochus woodi is a diplectanid monogenean parasitic on the gills of the red hind, Epinephelus guttatus. It has been described by Kritsky, Bakenhaster and Adams in 2015.

== Description ==
Pseudorhabdosynochus woodi is a small monogenean, 0.4 mm in length. The species has the general characteristics of other species of Pseudorhabdosynochus, with a flat body and a posterior haptor, which is the organ by which the monogenean attaches itself to the gill of is host. The haptor bears two squamodiscs, one ventral and one dorsal. The sclerotized male copulatory organ, or "quadriloculate organ", has the shape of a bean with four internal chambers, as in other species of Pseudorhabdosynochus. The vagina includes a sclerotized part, which is a complex structure.

== Etymology ==
According to Kritsky, Bakenhaster & Adams (2015), Pseudorhabdosynochus woodi was named for Dr. Raymond A. Wood, co-discoverer of the species on red hind in Bermuda.

== Diagnosis ==
Kritsky, Bakenhaster & Adams (2015) wrote that Pseudorhabdosynochus woodi differs from Pseudorhabdosynochus mizellei by possessing an ovate chamber in the vaginal sclerite (versus two chambers of P. mizellei small and lacking a definitive shape). It most closely resembles P. justinella and P. bunkleywilliamsae by possessing a short robust ventral bar and a vaginal sclerite having a sigmoid distal tube. The chamber of the vaginal sclerite is small and ovate in P. woodi (larger and subspherical in P. justinella and P. bunkleywilliamsae).

== Hosts and localities ==
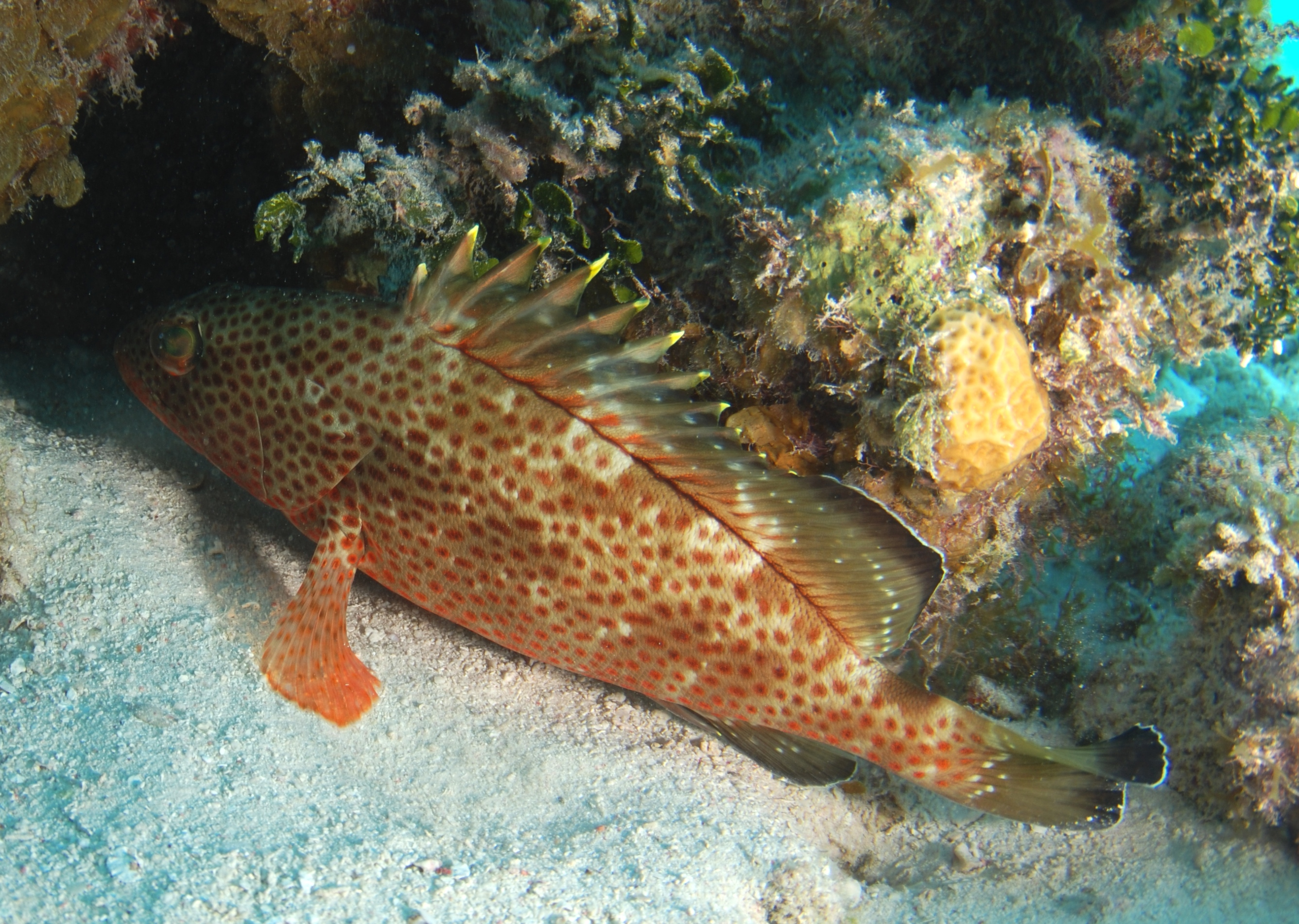
The red hind, Epinephelus guttatus is the type-host of Pseudorhabdosynochus woodi

The type-host and only recorded host of P. bunkleywilliamsae is the red hind, Epinephelus guttatus (Serranidae: Epinephelinae). The type-locality and only recorded locality is off Castle Roads, Bermuda.
