= Graysby =

Conservation status
- Least Concern (IUCN 3.1)

Scientific classification
- Kingdom: Animalia
- Phylum: Chordata
- Class: Actinopterygii
- Division: Teleostei
- Order: Perciformes
- Family: Epinephelidae
- Genus: Cephalopholis
- Species: C. cruentata

Binomial name
- Cephalopholis cruentata (Lacépède, 1802)

Synonyms
- List: Sparus cruentatus Lacepède, 1802; Epinephelus cruentatus (Lacepède, 1802); Petrometopon cruentatum (Lacepède, 1802); Petrometopon cruentatus (Lacepède, 1802); Serranus nigriculus Valenciennes, 1828; Serranus coronatus Valenciennes, 1828; Serranus apiarius Poey, 1860; Bodianus stellatus Blosser, 1909

Species of fish

The graysby (Cephalopholis cruentata) is a species of marine ray-finned fish, a grouper from the subfamily Epinephelinae which is in the family Serranidae which also includes the anthias and sea basses. It is found in the western Atlantic. It is associated with reefs and is a quarry species for commercial and recreational fisheries.

== Taxonomy ==
The graysby was first formally described in 1802 as Sparus cruentatus by the French naturalist Bernard Germain de Lacépède (1756–1825) with the type locality given as the Antilles and Bahamas.

== Distribution ==
The Graysby is found in the western Atlantic Ocean, the Caribbean Sea and the Gulf of Mexico. It is found from Cape Fear, North Carolina and Bermuda south to the Caribbean coast of South America.

Claims of this species being recorded from Brazil require confirmation.

== Description ==
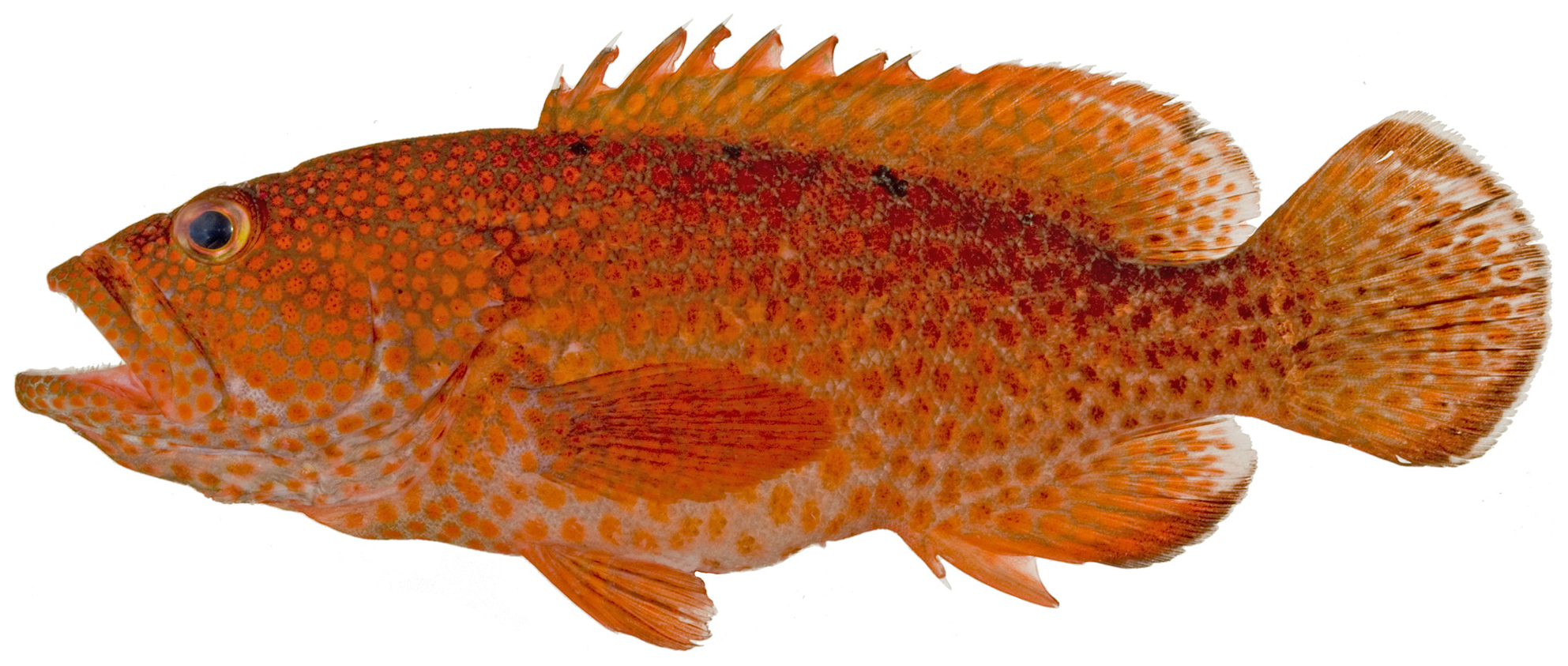
Cephalopholis cruentata

In Bonaire

The graysby has an oblong-shaped, robust body with a long snout and, when the mouth is closed, a slightly protruding upper jaw and a bony protuberance at the maxilla. The dorsal profile of the head is flat or slightly convex between its eyes. The majority of the teeth are movable. The dorsal fin contains 9 spines and 13–15 soft rays while the anal fin has 3 spines and 8 soft rays. The rounded peropercule has fine serrations on its margin but has no spines or notches, the operculum or gill cover has 3 flat spines, the central spine being the largest and upper spine is longer than the lowest. The caudal fin is rounded while the pelvic fins are shorter than the pectoral fins. The body is covered in rough scales and there are 69–81 scales in the lateral line.

The head, body, and fins are grey, brown or olive in colour and are covered with orange-brown spots and there are normally four spots along their upper back, underneath the dorsal fin which can change colour between black and white. A white stripe runs from the tip of the lower jaw, between the eyes and on to the nape.

The maximum recorded total length for this species is 42.6 centimetres (16.8 in), although they are more commonly around 20 centimetres (7.9 in), and the heaviest specimen recorded was 1.1 kilograms (2.4 lb).

== Habitat and biology ==
Fighting, at Quintana Roo, Mexico

Showing teeth, at the British Virgin Islands

The graysby inhabits Thalassia beds and coral reefs. In the Gulf of Mexico, they are found on rocky reef ledge in depths greater than 27 metres (89 ft). A solitary and secretive species, they usually stay near hiding places during the day. They prefer to remain within a small area of the home range of about 2,120 square metres (0.52 acres), especially during the day. The graysby is a nocturnal predator, adults feed mainly on fishes, with preference on Chromis multilineata, juveniles feed on shrimps. These fishes are protogynous hermaphrodites they all start life as female to male becoming males in their middle age.

Sex change takes place at 4 or 5 years old and at lengths of 20 to 23 centimetres (7.9 to 9.1 in). The change in sex occurs straight after the spawning period in August and September. The males vigorously guard a harem which have an average of one male to six female. When spawning, a female will releases between 260 and 600 eggs and the male then releases his milt to fertilise them. They can live for up to 13 years.

It is parasitized by Pseudorhabdosynochus meganmarieae.

== Utilisation ==
The graysby is a quarry species for both commercial fisheries and for anglers. It makes up 11% of the commercial reef-fish catch in Curaçao and it was taken by line, trap and spear fisheries in Honduras in the past but constitutes only a small part of the total reef-fish catch in Honduras. It is common around Cuba where it is not an important quarry species for fisheries. In the United States the fisheries for this species fall under the South Atlantic Fishery Management Council and both commercial and recreational fisheries have a close season which runs from 1 January to 30 April.

== Gallery ==
Showing teeth, in Florida

Florida

Florida

Florida

Florida

In Bonaire

At Sint Maarten

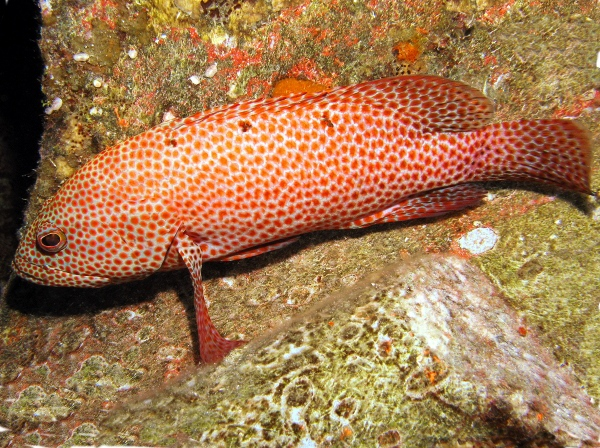
Showing the black spots along the back
