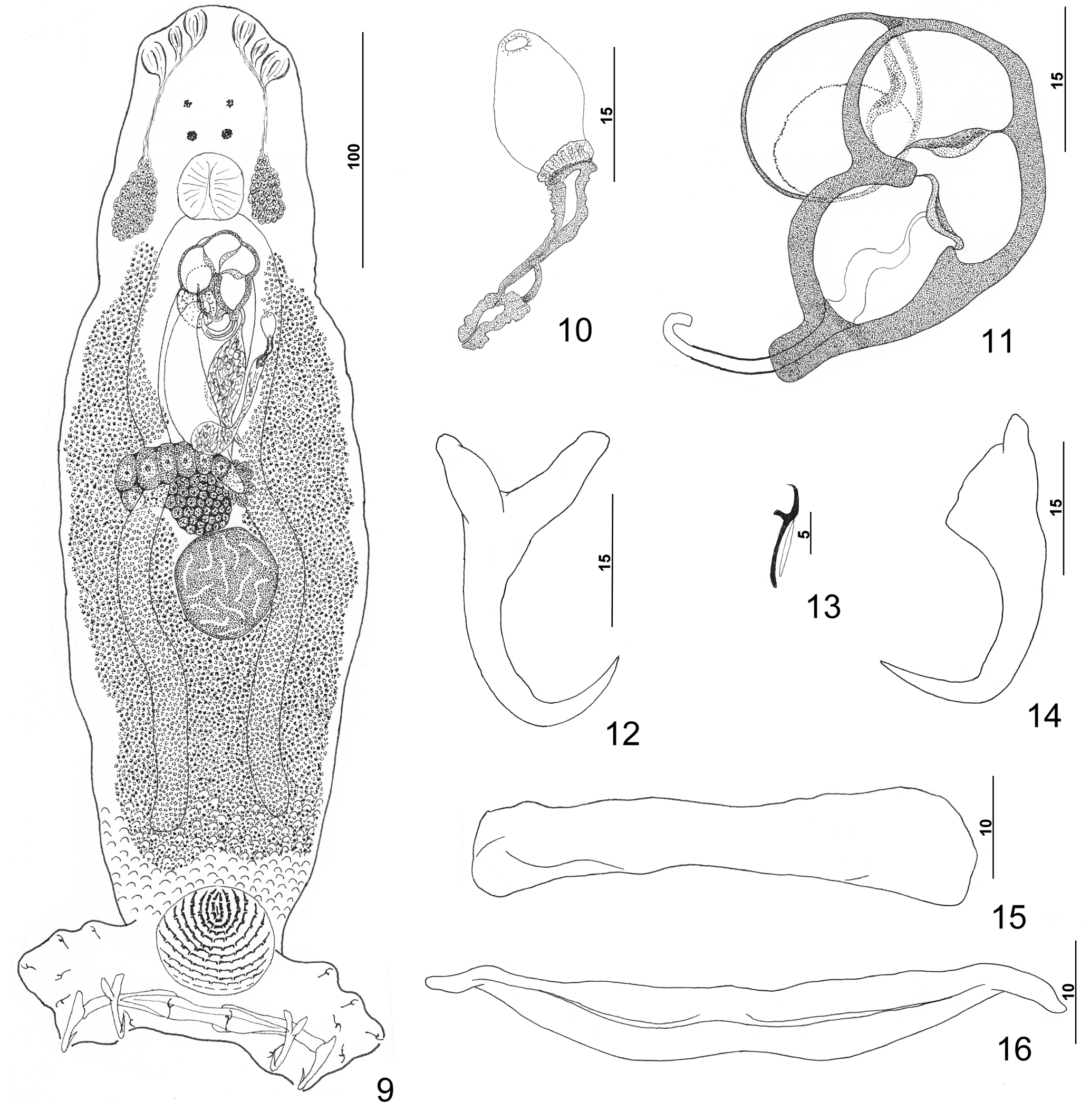
- Pseudorhabdosynochus yucatanensis, body and sclerotised parts

Scientific classification
- Kingdom: Animalia
- Phylum: Platyhelminthes
- Class: Monogenea
- Order: Dactylogyridea
- Family: Diplectanidae
- Genus: Pseudorhabdosynochus
- Species: P. yucatanensis

Binomial name
- Pseudorhabdosynochus yucatanensis Vidal-Martínez, Aguirre-Macedo & Mendoza-Franco, 1997

= Pseudorhabdosynochus yucatanensis =

Species of flatworm

Pseudorhabdosynochus yucatanensis is a diplectanid monogenean parasitic on the gills of the red grouper, Epinephelus morio. It was described by Vidal-Martínez, Aguirre-Macedo & Mendoza-Franco in 1997 and redescribed by Kritsky, Bakenhaster and Adams in 2015.

== Description ==
Pseudorhabdosynochus americanus is a small monogenean. The species has the general characteristics of other species of Pseudorhabdosynochus, with a flat body and a posterior haptor, which is the organ by which the monogenean attaches itself to the gill of is host. The haptor bears two squamodiscs, one ventral and one dorsal. The sclerotized male copulatory organ, or "quadriloculate organ", has the shape of a bean with four internal chambers, as in other species of Pseudorhabdosynochus. The vagina includes a sclerotized part, which is a complex structure.

The redescription by Kritsky, Bakenhaster & Adams in 2015 includes the following: Body elongate ovate, flattened dorsoventrally, with slight constriction at level of male copulatory organ (MCO). Numerous tegumental scales with rounded anterior margins extending from posterior ends of intestinal ceca into peduncle. Cephalic region broad, with rounded terminal and two poorly developed bilateral lobes; three bilateral pairs of head organs; pair of bilateral groups of cephalic-gland cells at level of pharynx. Four eyespots lacking lenses immediately anterior to pharynx; members of posterior pair larger, equidistant or slightly closer together than those of anterior pair; accessory chromatic granules small, irregular in outline, uncommon or absent in cephalic region. Pharynx ovate, muscular; esophagus short to nonexistent; intestinal ceca blind, extending posteriorly to level of peduncle. Peduncle broad, tapering posteriorly. Haptor subtrapezoidal, with dorsal and ventral anteromedial lobes containing respective squamodiscs and lateral lobes having hook pairs 2–4, 6, 7. Squamodiscs similar, each with 11 or 12 (usually 12) U-shaped rows of rodlets; innermost row closed. Ventral anchor with elongate superficial root, shorter deep root having lateral swelling, curved shaft, and moderately long recurved point extending to level of tip of superficial root. Dorsal anchor with subtriangular base, superficial root short to lacking, knoblike deep root, curved shaft, recurved point extending past level of tip of superficial root. Ventral bar with slight medial constriction, tapered ends, longitudinal medioventral groove. Paired dorsal bar with slightly spatulate medial end. Hook with elongate slightly depressed thumb, delicate point, uniform shank; FH loop nearly shank length. Testis subspherical, lying immediately posterior to germarium; proximal vas deferens not observed; seminal vesicle a simple dilation of distal vas deferens, lying just posterior to MCO; ejaculatory bulb apparently absent; large vesicle (prostatic reservoir?) with translucent contents lying dorsal to common genital pore. MCO reniform, quadriloculate, with moderately long cylindrical distal cone; distal tube with delicate wall; terminal filament delicate, variable in length; walls of three distal chambers comparatively thick; proximal chamber with delicate wall, frequently collapsing during mounting of specimen on slide. Germarium pyriform; germarial bulb lying slightly to right of body midline, with elongate dorsoventral distal loop around right intestinal cecum; ootype lying slightly to left of body midline, with well-developed Mehlis’ gland and giving rise to delicate banana-shaped uterus when empty. Common genital pore ventral, dextral to distal chamber of MCO. Vaginal pore sinistroventral at or slightly anterior to level of seminal vesicle; vagina with distal vestibule, small vaginal sclerite having two small tandem chambers; vaginal canal unsclerotized, extending diagonally within body to seminal receptacle. Seminal receptacle lying on body midline immediately anterior to ootype. Bilateral and common vitelline ducts not observed; vitellarium absent in regions of other reproductive organs, otherwise extending from level of MCO to anterior limit of peduncle.

Kritsky, Bakenhaster & Adams (2015) wrote that "examination of the holotype, three paratypes, and voucher specimens from red grouper off Florida and Mississippi indicated that the original description of P. yucatanensis was based on specimens representing two distinct species of Pseudorhabdosynochus", namely P. yucatanensis sensu stricto and P. justinella Kritsky, Bakenhaster & Adams, 2015. They considered that P. yucatanensis (s. s.) most closely resembles P. meganmarieae Kritsky, Bakenhaster & Adams, 2015 in the comparative morphology of their vaginal sclerites.

== Hosts and localities ==
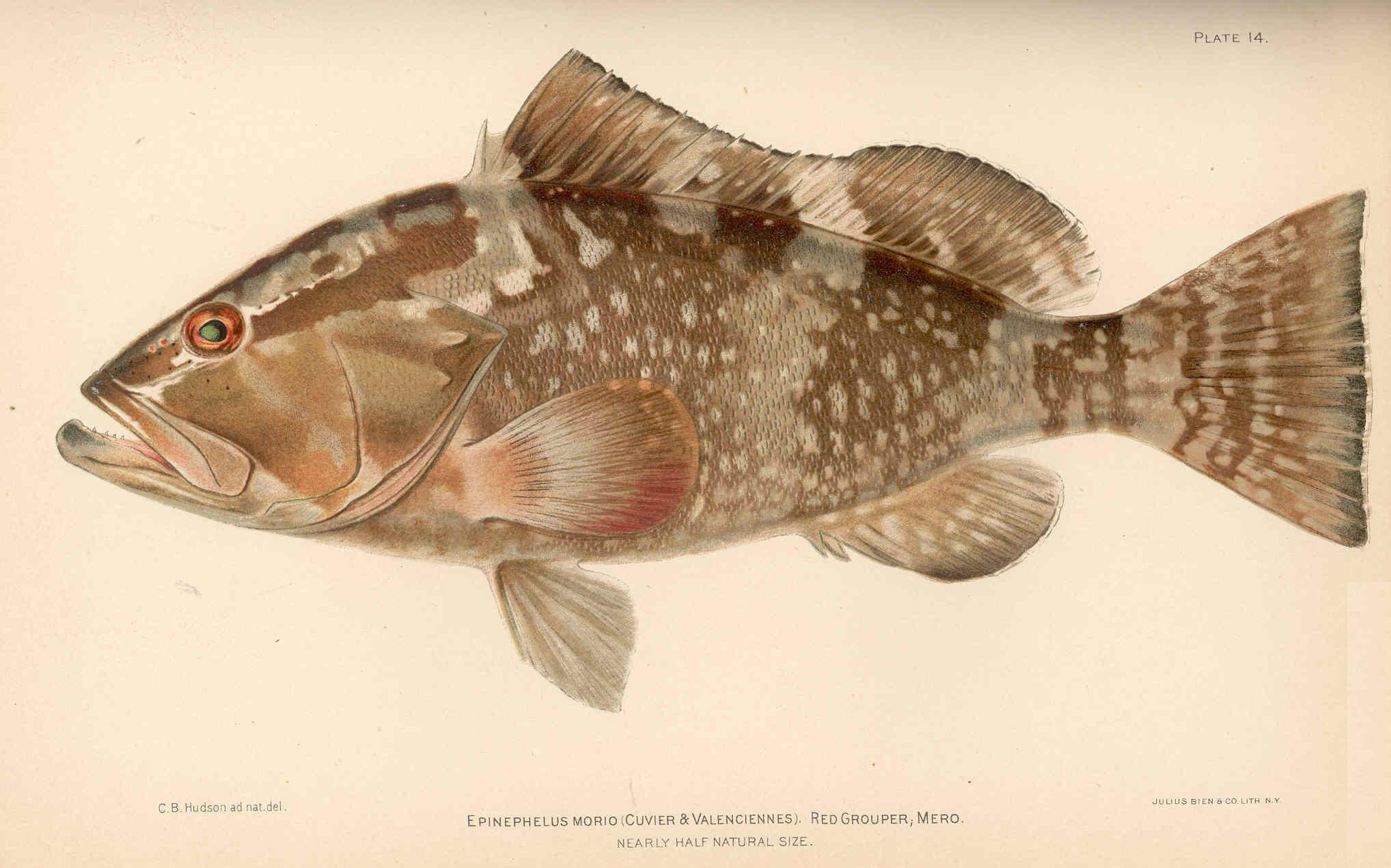
The red grouper, Epinephelus morio is the type-host of Pseudorhabdosynochus yucatanensis

The type-host of Pseudorhabdosynochus yucatanensis is the red grouper, Epinephelus morio and no other host has been mentioned. The type-locality is off Progreso, Yucatan, Mexico. Other localities include various places off the Yucatan Peninsula, Mexico [Celestun, Progreso, Sisal, Chelem, Telchac, Chuburna, Chicxulub, and Rio Lagartos (all Yucatan State), Campeche (Campeche State), and Chiquila (Quintana Roo State), Florida Middle Grounds, Gulf of Mexico, and an artificial reef in the Gulf of Mexico off Mississippi.
