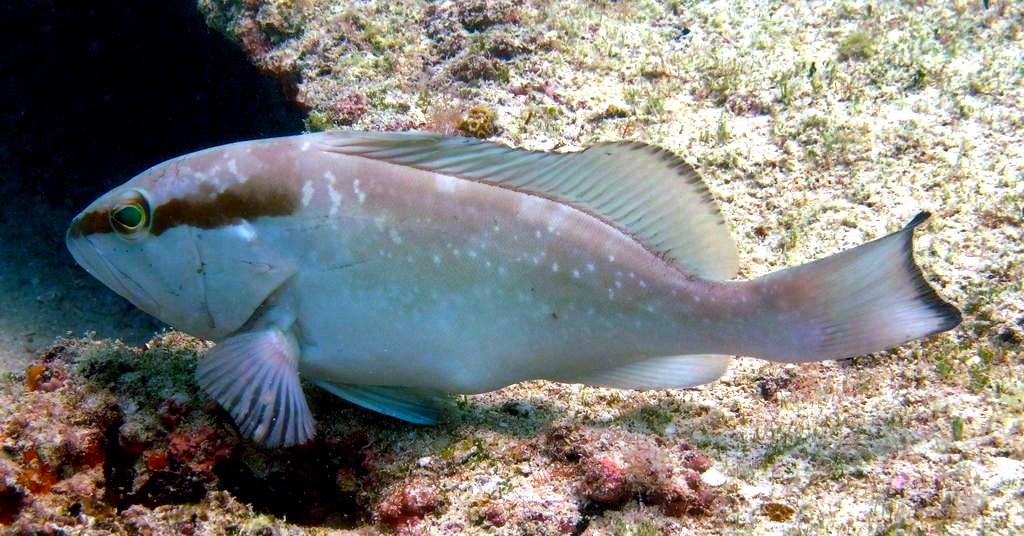

Conservation status
- Vulnerable (IUCN 3.1)

Scientific classification
- Kingdom: Animalia
- Phylum: Chordata
- Class: Actinopterygii
- Order: Perciformes
- Family: Epinephelidae
- Genus: Epinephelus
- Species: E. morio

Binomial name
- Epinephelus morio (Valenciennes, 1828)

Synonyms
- Serranus morio Valenciennes, 1828; Serranus erythrogaster DeKay, 1842; Serranus luridus Ranzani, 1842; Serranus remotus Poey, 1860; Serranus angustifrons Steindachner, 1864

= Red grouper =

Species of fish

The red grouper (Epinephelus morio) is a species of marine ray-finned fish, a grouper from the subfamily Epinephelinae which is part of the family Serranidae, which also includes the anthias and sea basses. It is found in the western Atlantic Ocean.

== Description ==
The red grouper has a body with a standard length which is 2.6 to 3 times as long as it is deep. The preopercle is subangular with the serrations at its angle being slightly enlarged and the upper edge of the gill cover is straight. The gill cover has three flat spines with the central spine being the longest. The dorsal fin contains 11 spines and 16 or 17 soft rays while the anal fin has three spines and eight soft rays. The pectoral fins are longer than the pelvic fins and the caudal fin is truncate. The pelvic fins insert posterior to the insertion site of the pectoral fins. Red grouper are dark reddish brown on the upper part of the head and body, shading to paler pink on the underparts. They are marked with lighter spots and blotches across their body and there are darker margins to the fins. This species has a maximum published total length of 125 centimetres (49 in), although they a more commonly found at lengths around 50 centimetres (20 in), and a maximum published weight of 23 kilograms (51 lb).

When aggravated (they are highly territorial) or involved in spawning activities, these fish can very rapidly change coloration patterns, with the head or other parts of the body turning completely white, and the white spots appearing more intense.

== Distribution ==
The red grouper's typical range is coastal areas in the western Atlantic, stretching from southern Brazil to North Carolina in the US and including the Gulf of Mexico and Bermuda. It lives in areas with wide continental shelves and is considered to be a neritic species.

== Habitat and biology ==
The red grouper is a demersal, largely sedentary species which has an extended (~40 day) pelagic larval stage before it settles in shallow coastal hardbottom habitat as juveniles. They remain in inshore waters for 4–5 years before migrating to offshore hardbottom habitat—particularly on the edge of the continental shelf—as adults. Spawning occurs offshore between January and June, peaking in May. While primarily eating benthic invertebrates, the red grouper is an opportunistic feeder in the reef community. The diet commonly includes xanthid and portunid crabs, juvenile spiny lobster, and snapping shrimp, with the occasional fish.

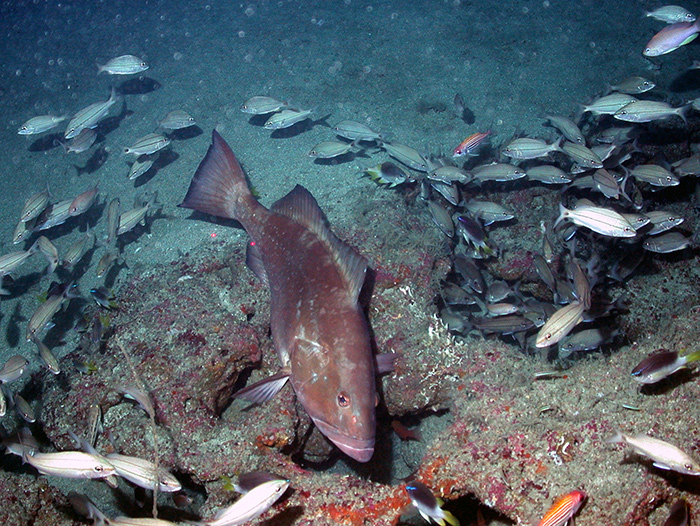
Red grouper (Epinephelus morio) on an excavated site on Pulley Ridge on the West Florida Shelf

=== Habitat engineers of the sea ===
Red grouper actively excavate pits in the seafloor. They start digging in the sediment from the time they settle out of the plankton and continue throughout their lifetime. They use their caudal fin and their mouths to remove debris and sediment from rocks, creating exposed surfaces on which sessile organisms actively settle (e.g., sponges, soft corals, algae). The exposure of structure also attracts a myriad of other species, including mobile invertebrates and a remarkable diversity of other fishes, from gobies and butterflyfish to grunts and snapper. The lionfish Pterois volitans started invading red grouper habitat by 2008, from Florida Bay to the Florida Keys and offshore to Pulley Ridge, a mesophotic coral reef on the West Florida Shelf west of the Dry Tortugas. Known for being extremely capable predators on small reef fish, scientists are very interested in determining the extent to which their invasion changes the functional dynamics of associated communities.

=== Parasites ===
As other fish, red groupers harbour a number of parasites, including, on its gills, the monogeneans Pseudorhabdosynochus justinella and Pseudorhabdosynochus yucatanensis.

== Taxonomy ==
The red grouper was first formally described as Serranus morio in 1828 by the French zoologist Achille Valenciennes (1794–1865), with the type locality given as the fish market in New York, the fish being "probably caught south of there".

== Utilisation ==
The red grouper is a commercially important species for fisheries throughout its range and it is also a valuable resource for recreational fisheries too. It is the most frequently captured grouper by commercial fisheries in the United States and in Mexico.

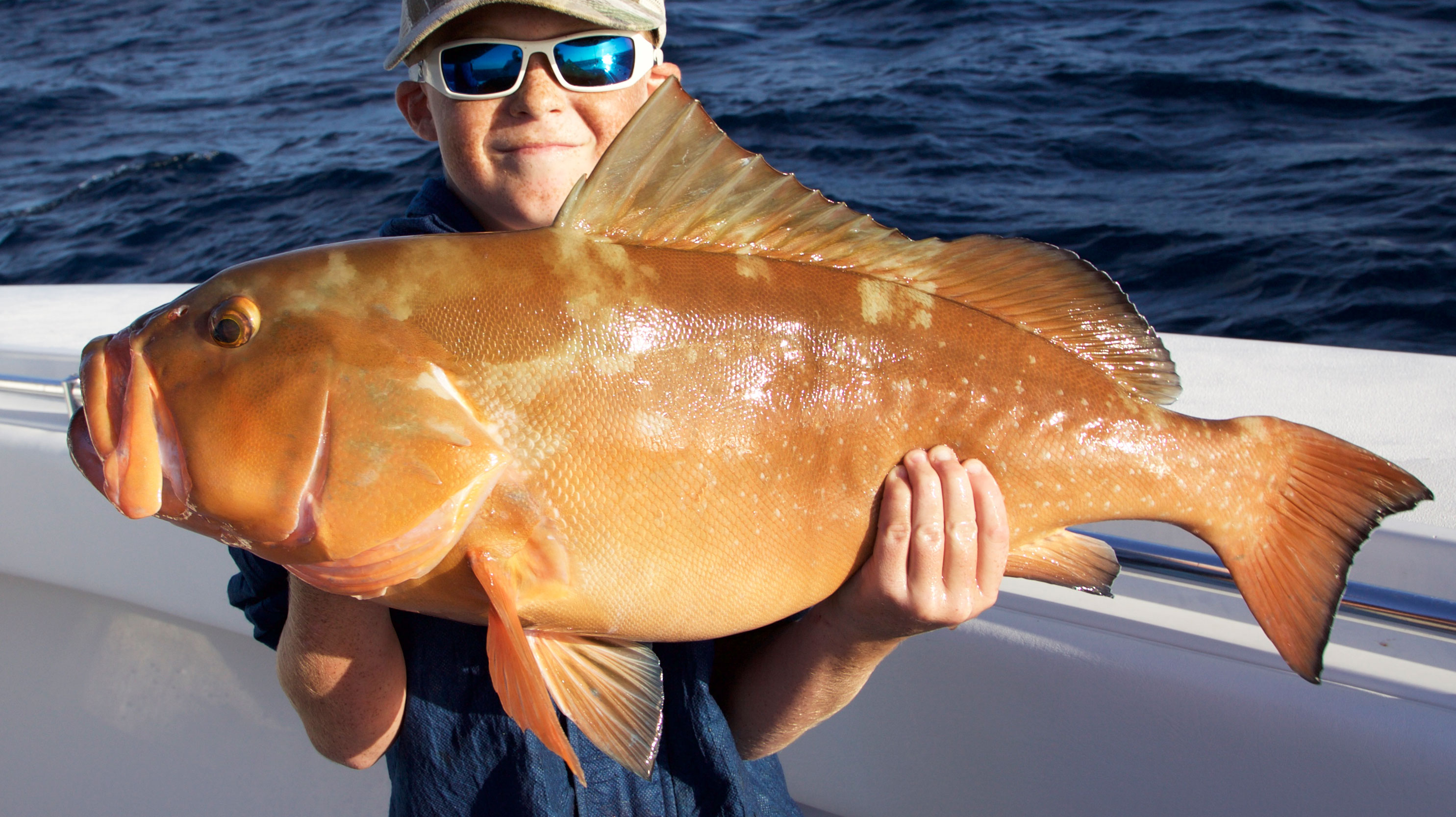
Red grouper caught off Key West in the Florida Keys.

== Conservation ==
The International Union for Conservation of Nature has classified the red grouper as a vulnerable species. It is estimated to have declined globally by at least 30 percent over three generations or 51 years. The major threat to the species' survival is overfishing, with possible contributions in the Gulf of Mexico from hypoxia, algal blooms, oil and gas exploration and increasing sea temperatures due to climate change.
