= Pseudorhabdosynochus monaensis =

- Sclerotised parts

Scientific classification
- Kingdom: Animalia
- Phylum: Platyhelminthes
- Class: Monogenea
- Order: Dactylogyridea
- Family: Diplectanidae
- Genus: Pseudorhabdosynochus
- Species: P. monaensis

Binomial name
- Pseudorhabdosynochus monaensis Dyer, Williams & Bunkley-Williams, 1994

Species of flatworm

Pseudorhabdosynochus monaensis is a diplectanid monogenean parasitic on the gills of the rock hind, Epinephelus adscensionis. It has been described by Dyer, Williams & Bunkley-Williams in 1994 and redescribed by Kritsky, Bakenhaster and Adams in 2015.

== Description ==
Pseudorhabdosynochus monaensis is a small monogenean, about 700 μm in length. The species has the general characteristics of other species of Pseudorhabdosynochus, with a flat body and a posterior haptor, which is the organ by which the monogenean attaches itself to the gill of is host. The haptor bears two squamodiscs, one ventral and one dorsal. The sclerotized male copulatory organ, or "quadriloculate organ", has the shape of a bean with four internal chambers, as in other species of Pseudorhabdosynochus. The vagina includes a sclerotized part, which is a complex structure.

== Diagnosis ==
Kritsky, Bakenhaster & Adams (2015) wrote that P. monaensis is easily distinguished from other species of Pseudorhabdosynochus of the western Atlantic Ocean by its unique vaginal sclerite. Other features defining the species include the elongate ventral bar with a minimal medial constriction and a male copulatory organ having a comparatively long cone.

== Hosts and localities ==
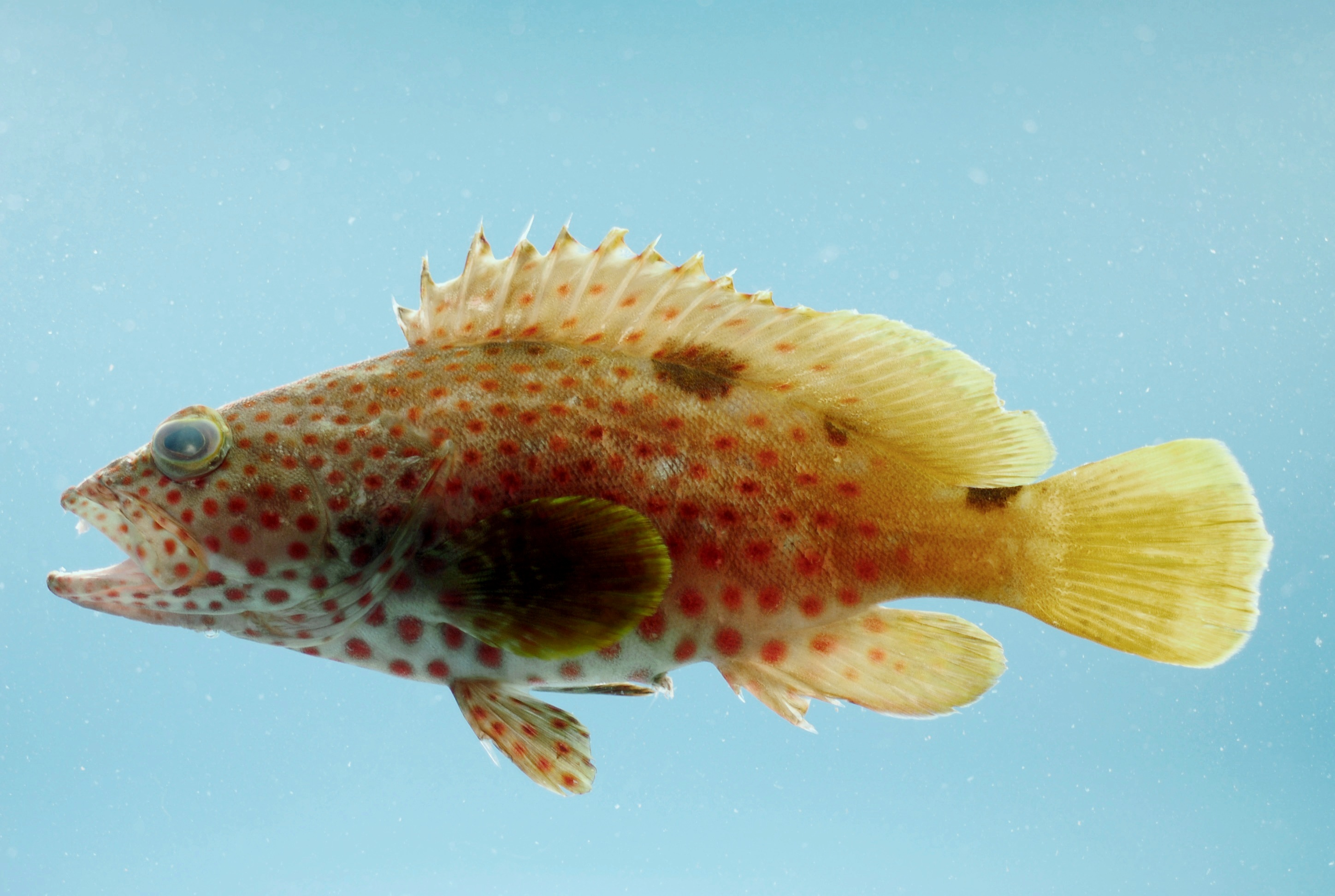
The rock hind, Epinephelus adscensionis is the type-host of Pseudorhabdosynochus monaensis

The type-host and only recorded host of P. monaensis is the rock hind, Epinephelus adscensionis (Serranidae: Epinephelinae). The type-locality and only locality is Rock ridges off Playa Sardinera, Mona Island, Puerto Rico.
