= Pulley Ridge =

Coral reef in the Gulf of Mexico

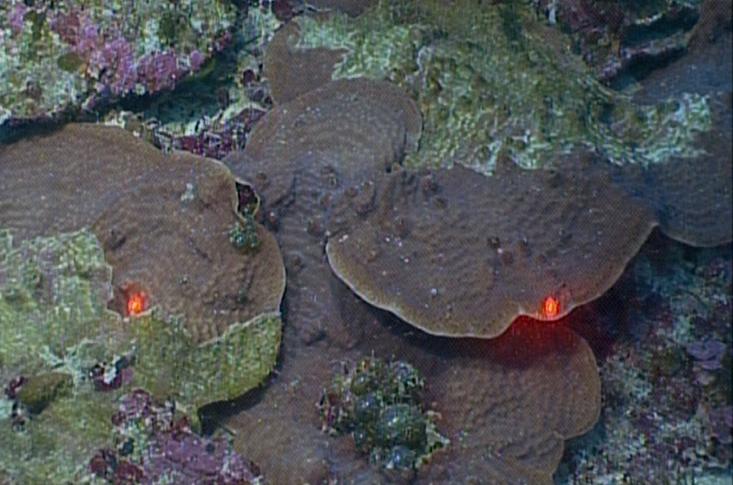
- Projoverview coral figure 2 750

- Location within Florida Location within the Caribbean

Location
- Location: Caribbean
- Coordinates: 24°45′00″N 83°45′00″W
- Country: United States

Geology
- Type: reef

Pulley Ridge is a mesophotic coral reef system off the shores of the continental United States. The reef rests on sunken barrier islands that succumbed to rising sea levels caused by the melting of ice sheets approximately 12,000-14,000 years ago. It lies 100 miles west of the Tortugas Ecological Reserve and stretches north about 60 miles at depths ranging from 60 to 80 meters. Pulley Ridge was originally discovered in 1950 during a dredging operation conducted by an academic group from Texas. While well known to fishermen, this remarkable habitat remained undiscovered by scientists until 1999 when the U.S. Geological Survey (USGS) and graduate students from the University of South Florida happened upon it. This reef system, like other mesophotic ecosystems, is inhabited by photosynthesizing corals and algae that are adapted to low-light environments. It is habitat for numerous species of bottom fish including Epinephelus morio (red grouper) spawning area.

"Although deeper-water corals form reefs in the dark of ocean depths, Pulley Ridge is the deepest photosynthetic coral reef that we know of today," said Robert Halley, former US Geological Survey marine geologist." Other reefs lie about 46 meters below sea level.

Once established on the seabed, the corals help create hard bottom habitat that becomes home to a diverse community of algae and animals that includes some species that are unique to these communities, and others species that are also found in shallower reef habitats. Understanding the factors that determine where mesophotic reefs are located and distances over which species living within such environments disperse and therefore 'connect' populations are of great interest to marine scientists and resource managers alike. Despite this interest, the deep depths of such reefs hinders both their discovery and their exploration.

Coral reefs struggle to survive in the world today. "In the past 10 years the world has lost 25% of the known living coral reefs". Coral reefs are particularly damaged by "…climate change, over fishing and coastal pollution". Scientists hope that through the exploration of Pulley Ridge, they can gain new insight of how reefs function in order to better preserve other reefs.

== The first scientific dives on Pulley Ridge ==
In 2002, the Gulf of Mexico Fishery Management Council through NOAA's Coral Reef Conservation Grant Program funded an expedition to examine the habitat and fish fauna on Pulley Ridge. Led by Chief scientist Bob Halley (U.S. Geological Survey, St. Petersburg, FL).

Other expeditions have followed, including one led by James K. Culter of the Mote Marine Laboratory in Sarasota, Florida and included over 40 team members. The trip went from 23 June through 1 July 2005. The aim of this mission was to collect primary data and biological samples and to document marine life through still photographs and video The expedition was done at depths ranging from 200 to 260 feet. "…very few scientific reef investigations are conducted within the depth zone between traditional scuba air limits of 130 feet and deep-sea submersible research at and below 500 feet".

During these explorations of Pulley Ridge, scientists found bioluminescent bacteria living in the reef that may have some significance to the ridge. Cutler mentioned that compared to a shallow reef, there seemed to be fewer fish. Tilefish and groupers were seen at the ridge. He noted that this could have been because they were scared away by the divers or the fish could only come out at night. There appeared to be fewer crustaceans than one would normally see in a shallow reef, but there were several species of algae present.

== Back to the Reef: Coral Ecosystem Connectivity: From Pulley Ridge to the Florida Keys ==
In 2011, NOAA funded an ambitious project to fill the knowledge gaps on connectivity between Pulley Ridge and other reef systems throughout the Gulf of Mexico and the Florida Keys. The project involves 35 scientists from 11 different institutions, working on everything from tracking plankton diversity and abundance to studies of the seabed and the use of habitat by economically important fish species. The project focuses on genetic studies to evaluate connectivity among populations of reef species, as well as describing the structure and determining the economic value of Pulley Ridge's mesophotic communities. Results from this study will provide critical information to resource managers so that they can manage and protect shallow and mesophotic coral ecosystems.

Mission logs from this project include descriptions of focal species ranging from mesophotic algae to red grouper.

== Fish species of Pulley Ridge ==
Snapper species

- Mutton snapper, Blackfin snapper, Cubera snapper, Dog snapper, Lane snapper, Mangrove snapper, Wenchman snapper, Queen snapper, Vermillion snapper, Yelloweye snapper, American Red snapper, Yellowtail snapper.

Grouper species

- Red Grouper, Black Grouper, Gag Grouper, Scamp Grouper, Warsaw Grouper, Snowy Grouper, Yellowedge Grouper, Misty Grouper, Kitty Mitchell Grouper, Yellowmouth Grouper, Goliath Grouper, Rock Hind Grouper, Yellowfin Grouper, Coney Grouper.

Pelagic species

- Wahoo, King Mackerel, Blackfin tuna, Cobia, Mahi Mahi, Sailfish, Tripletail

Other

- Barrel fish, Longtail sea bass, Golden Tilefish, Blueline Tilefish, Almaco Jack, Greater Amber Jack, Lesser Amber Jack, Blackbelly Rosefish, Hogfish.

== Recreational/Commercial Fishing ==
Pulley Ridge offers a variety of fish that are caught by both recreational fishermen and commercial fishermen. It is important that all fishermen understand and adhere to current regulations and stay informed about new regulations to help keep the reef healthy and sustainable for future generations. Anchoring is prohibited on the reef, as well as bottom trawling, buoy gear, pots, and traps. Fishermen must also use non stainless steel inline circle hooks, and all vessels must carry a dehooking tool and carry either a venting tool or descending device. Using reef fish as bait is illegal. Fishing regulations are subject to change, and fishermen should consult current regulations published by the relevant fisheries management authorities before fishing an area.
