= Pseudorhabdosynochus meganmarieae =

- Body and sclerotised parts

Scientific classification
- Kingdom: Animalia
- Phylum: Platyhelminthes
- Class: Monogenea
- Order: Dactylogyridea
- Family: Diplectanidae
- Genus: Pseudorhabdosynochus
- Species: P. meganmarieae

Binomial name
- Pseudorhabdosynochus meganmarieae Kritsky, Bakenhaster & Adams, 2015

Species of flatworm

Pseudorhabdosynochus meganmarieae is a diplectanid monogenean parasitic on the gills of the Graysby, Cephalopholis cruentata. It has been described by Kritsky, Bakenhaster and Adams in 2015.

== Description ==
Pseudorhabdosynochus meganmarieae is a small monogenean. The species has the general characteristics of other species of Pseudorhabdosynochus, with a flat body and a posterior haptor, which is the organ by which the monogenean attaches itself to the gill of is host. The haptor bears two squamodiscs, one ventral and one dorsal. The sclerotized male copulatory organ, or "quadriloculate organ", has the shape of a bean with four internal chambers, as in other species of Pseudorhabdosynochus. The vagina includes a sclerotized part, which is a complex structure.

== Diagnosis ==
Kritsky, Bakenhaster & Adams (2015) wrote that Pseudorhabdosynochus meganmarieae is easily distinguished from all other known congeners from the western Atlantic region by having ventral anchors with short roots and an elongate straight shaft. Based on the presence of two small chambers and a distal funnel-shaped tube in the vaginal sclerites, P. meganmarieae most closely resembles P. yucatanensis, but the vaginal sclerite in P. meganmarieae is more robust and its distal end has a more pronounced funnel shape than that of P. yucatanensis. It differs further from P. yucatanensis by lacking tegumental scales and by having a comparatively deep medial constriction in the ventral bar and a tapered cone and thinner walls of the chambers of the male copulatory organ.

== Etymology ==
Kritsky, Bakenhaster and Adams (2015) indicated that the species Pseudorhabdosynochus meganmarieae was named "for Megan-Marie (Duckworth) Bakenhaster, who helped to make this study possible by spending weeks and innumerable late nights isolated from adult company while caring for a young, singular child possessed of strong opinions on the limits of parental authority. Her patience and perseverance facilitated our collections of specimens of this and other species of Pseudorhabdosynochus reported herein."

== Hosts and localities ==
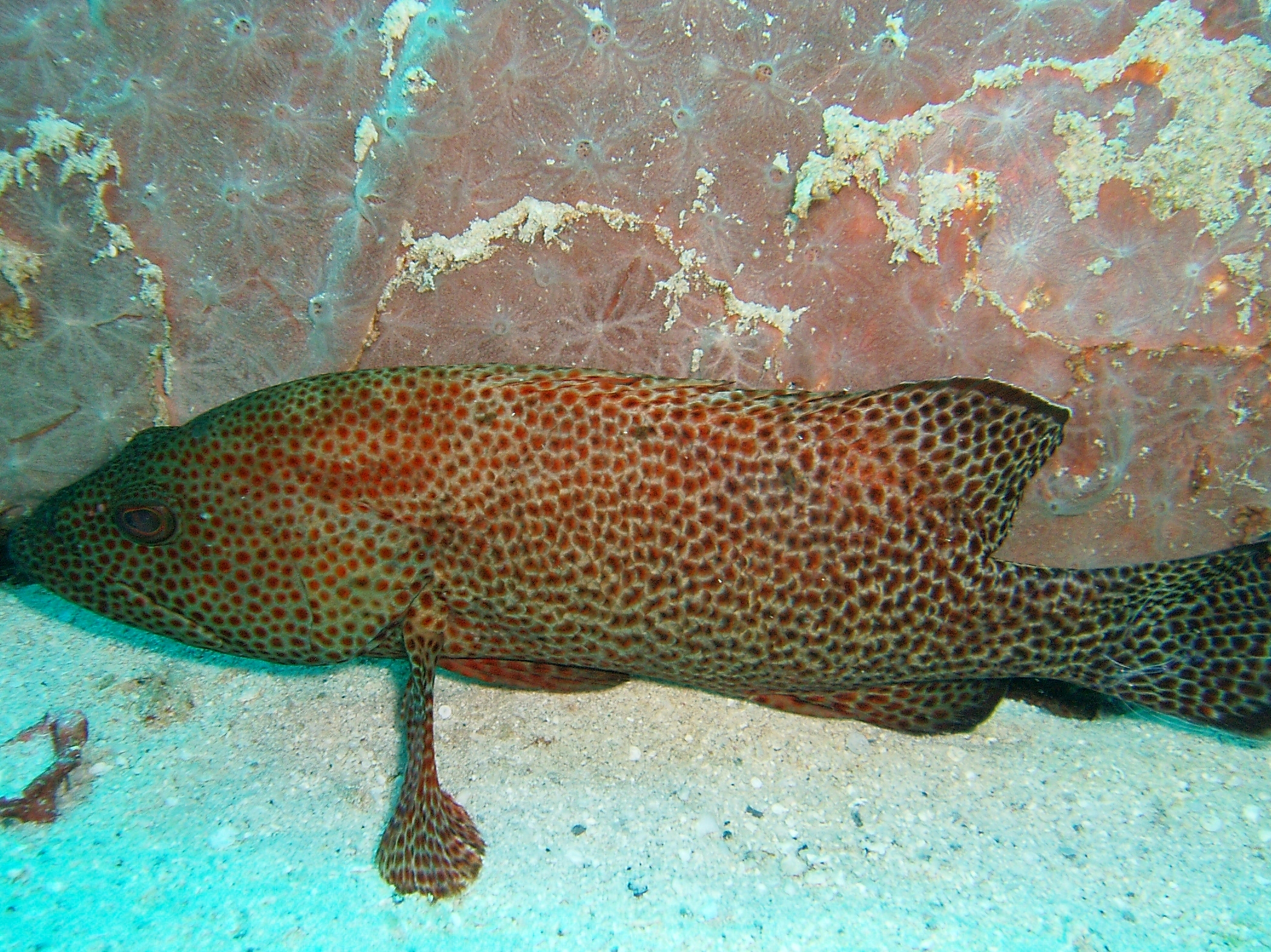
The Graysby, Cephalopholis cruentata is the type-host of Pseudorhabdosynochus meganmarieae

The type-host and only recorded host of Pseudorhabdosynochus meganmarieae is the Graysby, Cephalopholis cruentata (Serranidae: Epinephelinae). The type-locality is Florida Middle Grounds, Gulf of Mexico.
