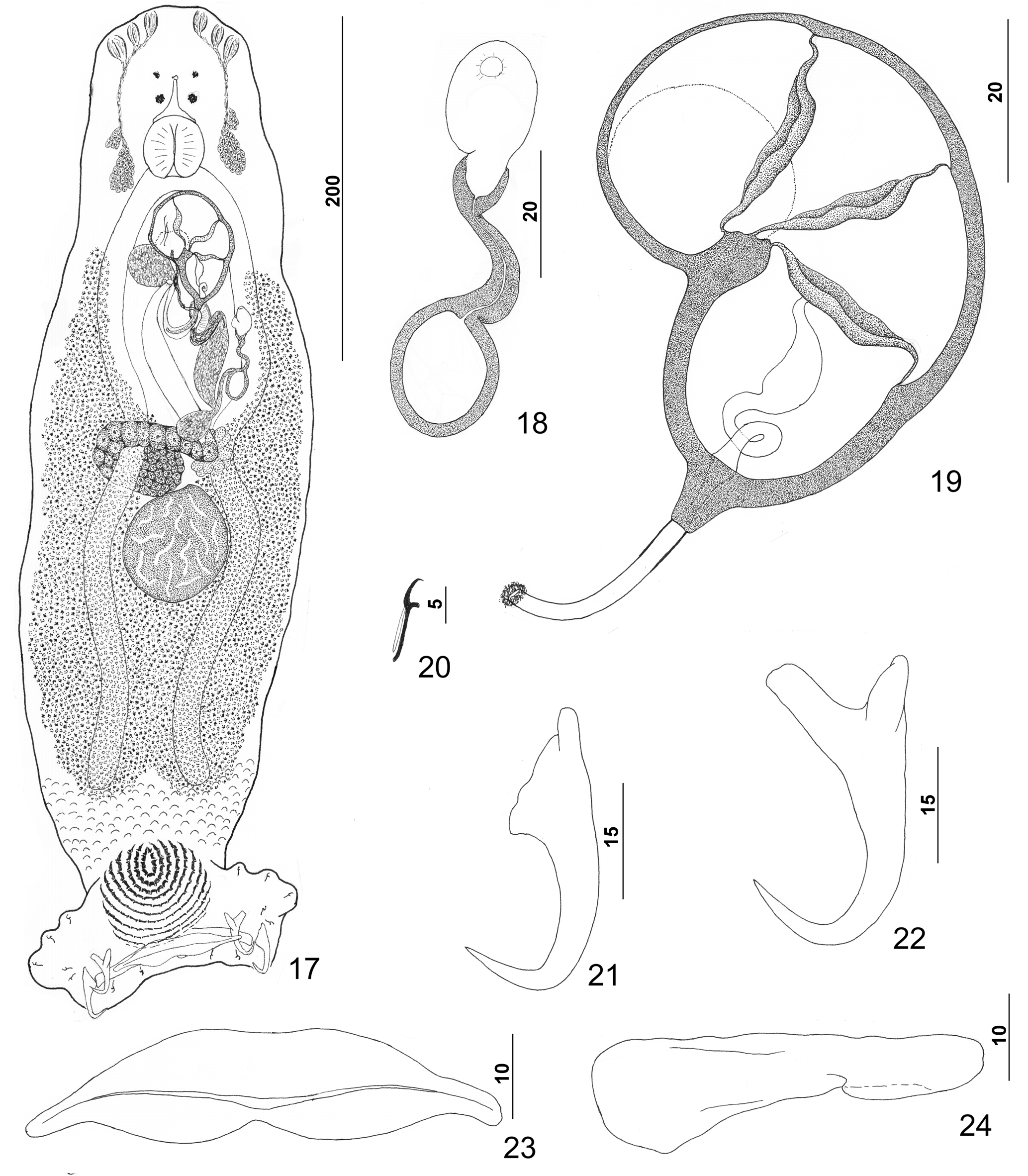
- Body and sclerotised parts

Scientific classification
- Kingdom: Animalia
- Phylum: Platyhelminthes
- Class: Monogenea
- Order: Dactylogyridea
- Family: Diplectanidae
- Genus: Pseudorhabdosynochus
- Species: P. justinella

Binomial name
- Pseudorhabdosynochus justinella Kritsky, Bakenhaster & Adams, 2015

= Pseudorhabdosynochus justinella =

Species of flatworm

Pseudorhabdosynochus justinella is a diplectanid monogenean parasitic on the gills of the red grouper, Epinephelus morio. It has been described by Kritsky, Bakenhaster and Adams in 2015.

The specific name justinella is in honor of parasitologist Jean-Lou Justine from National Museum of Natural History in France.

== Description ==
Pseudorhabdosynochus justinella is a small monogenean. The species has the general characteristics of other species of Pseudorhabdosynochus, with a flat body and a posterior haptor, which is the organ by which the monogenean attaches itself to the gill of is host. The haptor bears two squamodiscs, one ventral and one dorsal. The sclerotized male copulatory organ, or "quadriloculate organ", has the shape of a bean with four internal chambers, as in other species of Pseudorhabdosynochus. The vagina includes a sclerotized part, which is a complex structure.

The description by Kritsky, Bakenhaster & Adams in 2015 includes the following:

Body fusiform, dorsoventrally flattened, with a slight constriction at level of male copulatory organ (MCO); peduncle with small tegumental scales having rounded anterior margins. Cephalic region broad, with two terminal and two bilateral poorly developed lobes, three bilateral pairs of head organs, two bilateral groups of cephalic-gland cells at level of pharynx. Four eyespots lacking lenses immediately anterior to pharynx; members of posterior pair larger, slightly closer together than those of anterior pair; accessory chromatic granules small, irregular in outline, uncommon in cephalic region. Pharynx ovate to subspherical, muscular; esophagus short to nonexistent; intestinal ceca blind, extending posteriorly to level of peduncle, with ends slightly diverging. Peduncle broad, tapered posteriorly. Haptor subtrapezoidal, with dorsal and ventral anteromedial lobes containing respective squamodiscs and lateral lobes having hook pairs 2–4, 6, 7. Dorsal and ventral squamodiscs similar, subequal, each with 10–12 (usually 11) U-shaped rows of rodlets; innermost row usually closed. Ventral anchor with elongate superficial root, slightly shorter deep root having lateral swelling, slightly curved shaft, and moderately long recurved point extending just past level of tip of superficial root. Dorsal anchor with subtriangular base, poorly defined superficial root, elongate deep root, arcing shaft, recurved point extending past level of tip of superficial root. Ventral bar robust, with medial constriction, tapered ends, longitudinal medioventral groove. Paired dorsal bar with spatulate medial end. Hook with elongate slightly depressed thumb, delicate point, uniform shank; FH loop nearly shank length. Testis subspherical, lying sinistroposterior to germarium; proximal vas deferens not observed. Seminal vesicle a fusiform dilation of distal vas deferens, lying just posterior to MCO; ejaculatory bulb pyriform; large vesicle (prostatic reservoir?) lying to right of MCO. MCO reniform, quadriloculate, with short tapered cone, distal tube with delicate wall continuous with distal filament; distal filament with bulbous end; walls of chambers comparatively delicate, often collapsed. Germarium pyriform, lying at midlength of trunk, with dorsoventral distal loop around right intestinal cecum; ootype lying slightly to left of body midline and surrounded by well-developed Mehlis' gland; uterus banana-shaped when empty, delicate. Common genital pore ventral, dextral to distal chamber of MCO. Vaginal pore sinistroventral at level of seminal vesicle; vaginal vestibule with delicate wall; vaginal sclerite with small distal funnel, sigmoid tube leading to thick-walled ovate to subspherical chamber; proximal vaginal canal arising from chamber, extending to subovate seminal receptacle near body midline immediately anterior to ootype and Mehlis' gland. Bilateral and common vitelline ducts not observed; vitellarium dense, absent in regions of other reproductive organs, otherwise extending in bilateral fields of trunk from level of MCO to anterior limit of peduncle; bilateral fields confluent posterior to testis. Egg ovate (often collapsed due to staining and mounting procedures), lacking filaments. Measurements: Body 511 μm (420–661; n = 28) long, width at level of germarium 157 μm (114–202; n = 30). Haptor 152 μm (131–176;n = 27) wide; squamodisc 55 μm(43–61; n = 41) long, 68 μm (57–76; n = 42) wide. Ventral anchor 39 μm (36–42; n = 15) long; dorsal anchor 36 μm (34–38; n = 17) long. Ventral bar 67 μm (63–77; n = 14) long; dorsal bar 55 μm (51–59; n = 16) long. Hook 11–12 μm (n = 21) long. Pharynx 34 μm (29–43; n = 29) wide. MCO 62 μm (56–68; n = 28) long. Testis 64 μm (51–82; n = 22) long, 65 μm (50–77;n = 22) wide. Germarial bulb 34 μm (26–43; n = 19) wide. Egg 118–119 μm (n = 1) long, 54–55 μm (n = 1) wide.

== Diagnosis ==
Kritsky, Bakenhaster & Adams (2015) wrote that "examination of the holotype, three paratypes, and voucher specimens from red grouper off Florida and Mississippi indicated that the original description of P. yucatanensis Vidal-Martínez, Aguirre-Macedo & Mendoza-Franco, 1997 was based on specimens representing two distinct species of Pseudorhabdosynochus", namely P. yucatanensis sensu stricto and a new species, P. justinella Kritsky, Bakenhaster & Adams, 2015.

According to Kritsky, Bakenhaster & Adams (2015), P. justinella is most similar to P. woodi Kritsky, Bakenhaster & Adams, 2015 based on the comparative morphology of the vaginal sclerite, the ventral bar, and the ventral and dorsal anchors. In both species, the vaginal sclerite possesses an elongate sigmoid distal tube attached to the distal end of the chamber, the ventral bar is short and robust, the deep root of the ventral anchor is shorter than the superficial root, and the dorsal anchors of the two species are morphologically indistinguishable. P. justinella differs from P. woodi by having a vaginal sclerite with a larger (~20 μm in diameter) subspherical chamber (vaginal sclerite with a small [~10 μm in length] ovate chamber in P. woodi).

== Hosts and localities ==
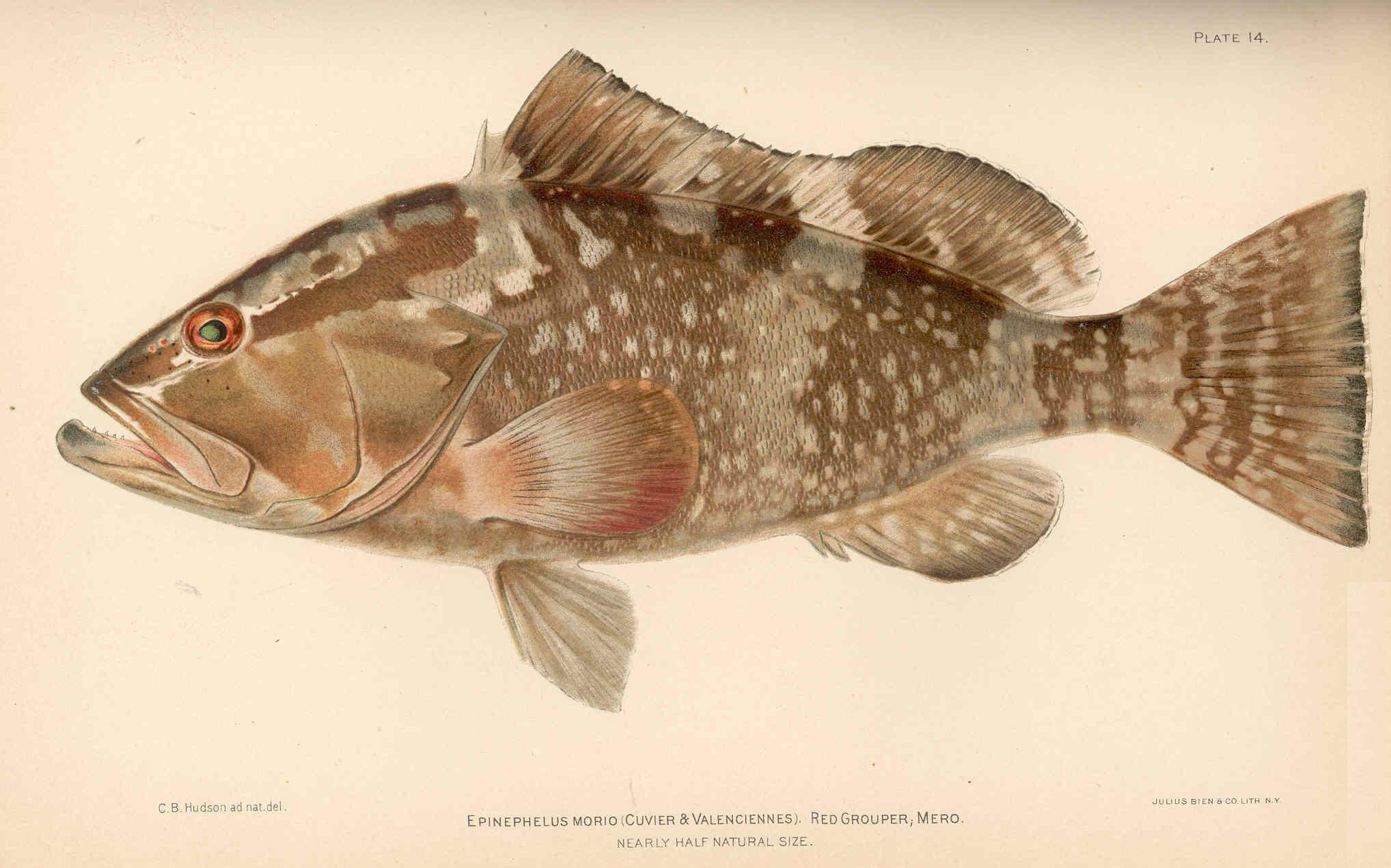
The Red grouper, Epinephelus morio is the type-host of Pseudorhabdosynochus justinella

The type-host and only recorded host is the Red grouper, Epinephelus morio (Serranidae: Epinephelinae). The type-locality is Florida Middle Grounds, Gulf of Mexico. Other localities are Gulf of Mexico (an area off Mississippi with numerous artificial reefs) and Progreso, Yucatán State, Mexico (as P. yucatanensis).
