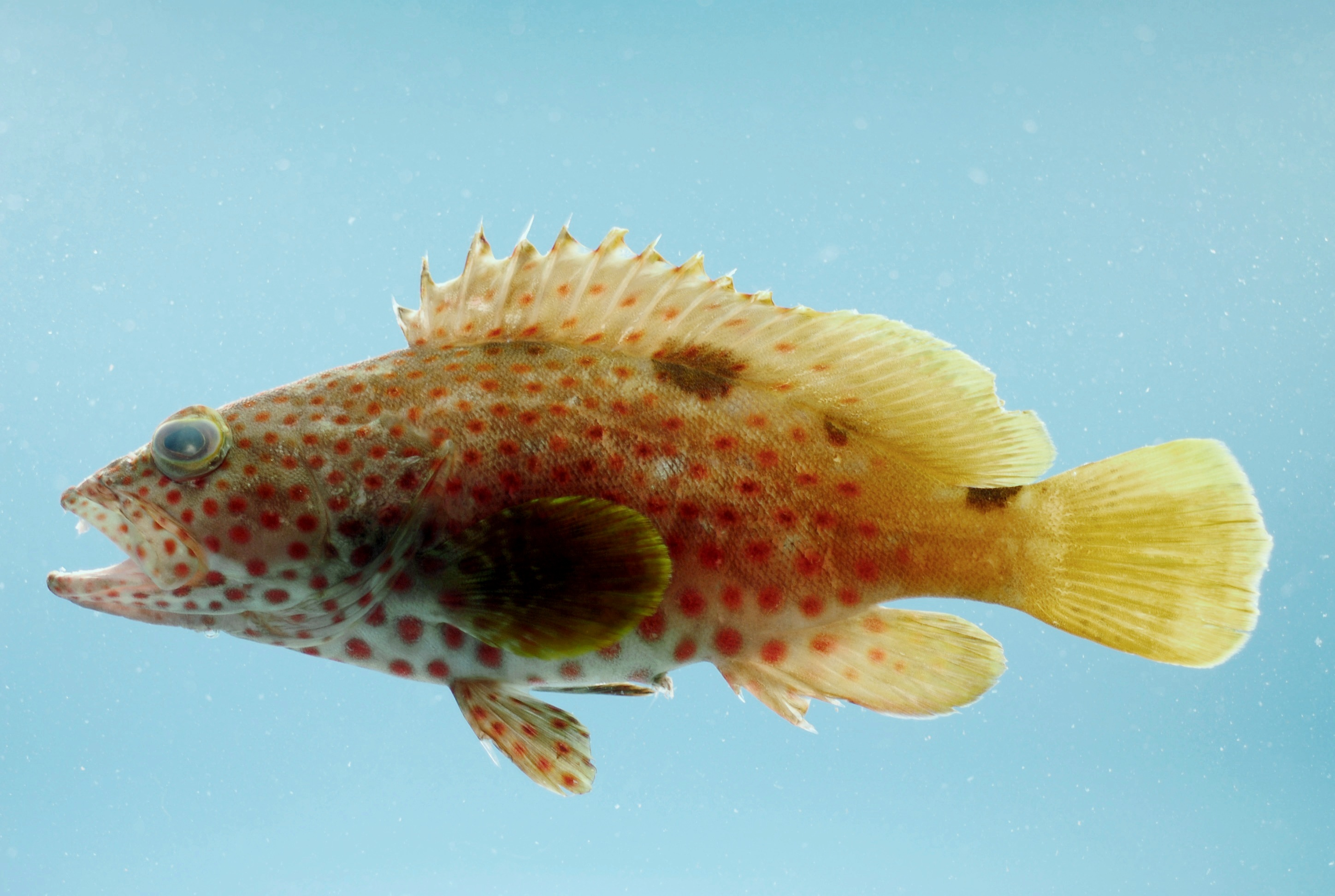
- Epinephelus adscensionis from the Gulf of Mexico

Scientific classification
- Kingdom: Animalia
- Phylum: Chordata
- Class: Actinopterygii
- Order: Perciformes
- Family: Epinephelidae
- Genus: Epinephelus
- Species: E. adscensionis

Binomial name
- Epinephelus adscensionis (Osbeck, 1765)

= Epinephelus adscensionis =

Species of fish

Epinephelus adscensionis, commonly known as the rock hind, is a species of ray-finned fish, a grouper within the subfamily, Epinephelinae. It is a wide-ranging species, from Ascension and St. Helena Islands and in the western Atlantic, as well as the Gulf of Mexico. They grow up to 60cm and to 3kg.

== Habitat ==
Rock hind occur on rocky reefs in depths of 2 to 100m, and mainly feed on crabs and fish. At St. Helena Islands, rock hind are often found in shallow waters.
