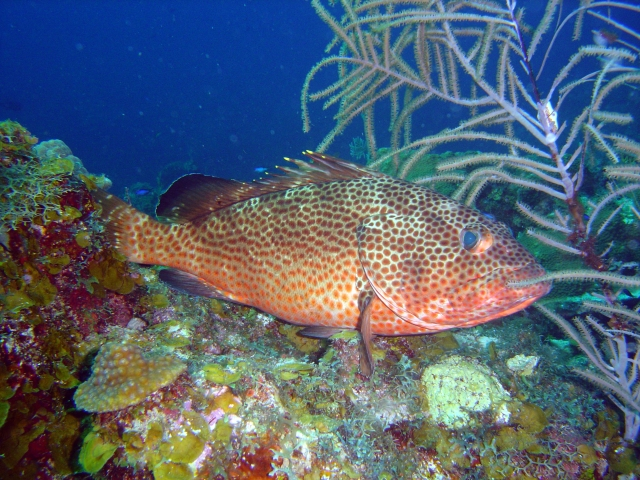

Conservation status
- Least Concern (IUCN 3.1)

Scientific classification
- Kingdom: Animalia
- Phylum: Chordata
- Class: Actinopterygii
- Division: Teleostei
- Order: Perciformes
- Family: Epinephelidae
- Genus: Epinephelus
- Species: E. guttatus

Binomial name
- Epinephelus guttatus (Linnaeus, 1758)

Synonyms
- Perca guttata Linnaeus, 1758; Holocentrus punctatus Bloch, 1790; Serranus maculosus Valenciennes, 1828; Serranus catus Valenciennes, 1828; Serranus arara Valenciennes, 1828; Epinephelus cubanus Poey, 1865; Serranus stathouderi Vaillant & Bocourt, 1878

= Red hind =

Species of fish

The red hind (Epinephelus guttatus), also known as the koon or lucky grouper in Caribbean vernacular, is a species of marine ray-finned fish, a grouper from the subfamily Epinephelinae which is part of the family Serranidae, which also includes the anthias and sea basses. It is native to the western Atlantic Ocean where it ranges from the eastern United States to Brazil. It is the most common species of Epinephelus in the Caribbean and Bermuda.

== Description ==
The red hind has a robust, compressed body which is deepest at the origin of the dorsal fin, the standard length being 2.7 to 3.1 times the depth. The gill cover has three flat spines on its margin. The preopercle has a finely serrated margin and protrudes slightly near its lower edge. The dorsal fin contains 11 spines and 15-16 soft rays while the anal fin has 3 spines and 8 soft rays. It has a slightly convex tail. This species is greenish grey to light brown on its upper body fading to white on the lower body, with many well-spaced dull orange-red to brown spots covering the head, body and fins. There are five indistinct oblique bars made up of darker spots on the flanks. This species attains a maximum total length of 76 centimetres (30 in), although they are more commonly around 40 centimetres (16 in) in length, and the maximum published weight is 22 kilograms (49 lb).

== Distribution ==
The red hind is found in the Western Atlantic. Its range extends from Bermuda and North Carolina and along the eastern coast of the United States into the Gulf of Mexico and the Caribbean. Its range is said to extend south as far as Brazil but there are no confirmed records from south of Venezuela.

== Habitat and biology ==
Red hinds inhabit coral reefs and rocky bottoms, the females remain close to the bottom, while the males patrol and defend an area from other males overlapping the home ranges of one to five female. Mantis shrimps make up over 15 percent of their diet. Crabs are the most common item on their diet, and fishes like Bluehead Wrasse, Thalassoma bifasciatum; Boga, Inermia vittata; goatfishes and small morays are included. Although they prefer shrimps and octopuses.

Red Hind are protogynous hermaphrodites, changing from females to males during a stage in their life cycle. What triggers the change is unknown. In Puerto Rico, the fish gather in or near familiar spawning grounds along sections of the insular shelf during a one to two week period in association with the lunar cycles of January and February. In 1992, a tagged Red Hind traveled more than ten miles, crossing over water 600 feet deep, bypassing other aggregations, to spawn at a particular site. Not much is known about the species' early life stages. Though, on rare occasions, one to two inch juveniles are sighted sneaking about near cover on patch reefs in moderate depths. Most adults live for ten to eleven years.

== Taxonomy ==
The red hind was first formally described as Perca guttata by Carolus Linnaeus in the 10th edition of his Systema Naturae in 1758.

== Utilisation ==
The red hind is one of the most valuable commercial species in the Caribbean in terms of the numbers and total weight of landings. It is caught with spears, hook and line and traps. It is an esteemed food fish and, among other grouper species, it is exported from Mexico to the United States. It is also valued by recreational fisheries.
