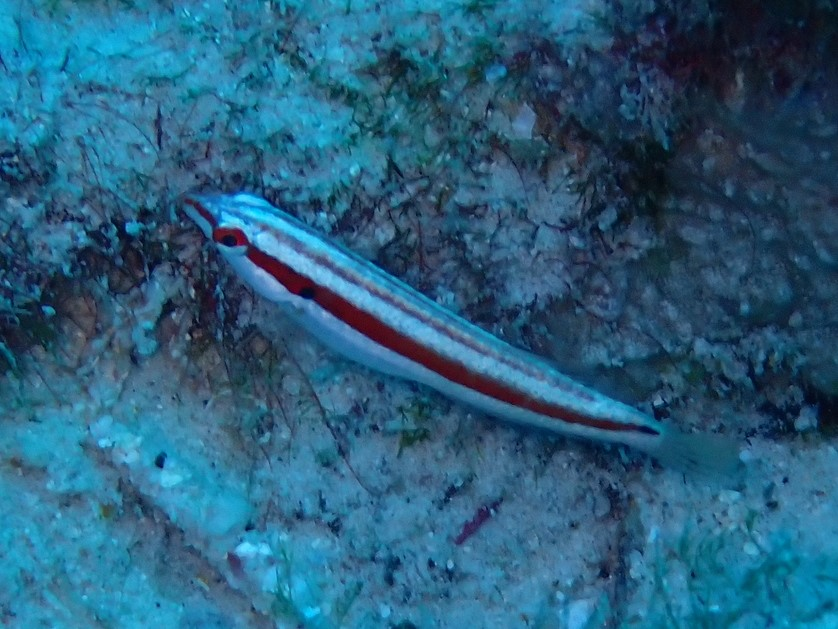

Conservation status
- Vulnerable (IUCN 3.1)

Scientific classification
- Kingdom: Animalia
- Phylum: Chordata
- Class: Actinopterygii
- Order: Labriformes
- Family: Labridae
- Genus: Halichoeres
- Species: H. salmofasciatus

Binomial name
- Halichoeres salmofasciatus G. R. Allen & D. R. Robertson, 2002

= Halichoeres salmofasciatus =

Species of fish

Halichoeres salmofasciatus, the red-striped wrasse, is a species of saltwater wrasse found in the eastern-central Pacific Ocean.

== Description ==
This species reaches a length of 6.3 cm (2.5 in).
