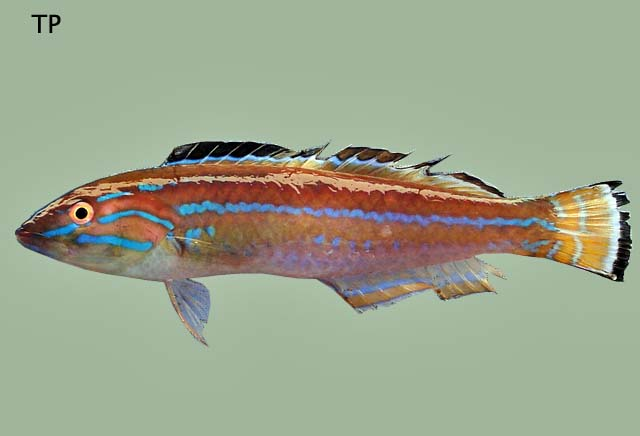

Scientific classification
- Domain: Eukaryota
- Kingdom: Animalia
- Phylum: Chordata
- Class: Actinopterygii
- Order: Labriformes
- Family: Labridae
- Genus: Halichoeres
- Species: H. inornatus

Binomial name
- Halichoeres inornatus (C. H. Gilbert, 1890)
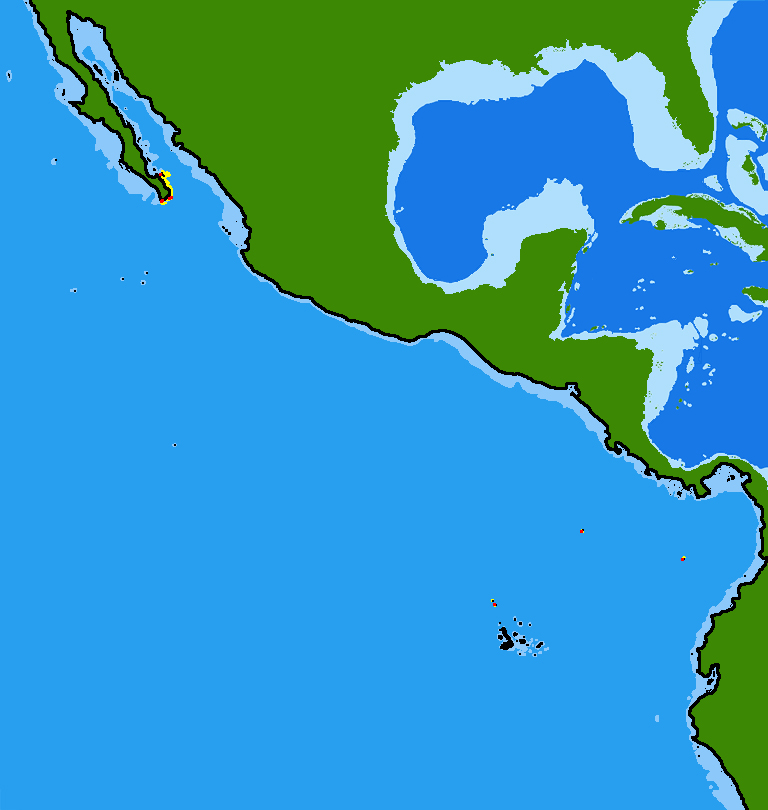

Synonyms
- Pseudojulis inornatus C. H. Gilbert, 1890; Pseudojuloides inornatus (C. H. Gilbert, 1890); Sagittalarva inornatus (C. H. Gilbert, 1890); Halichoeres raisneri C. C. Baldwin & McCosker, 2001

= Halichoeres inornatus =

Species of fish

Halichoeres inornatus, the cape wrasse, is a species of wrasse native to the eastern Pacific Ocean from Baja California to Colombia, including Cocos Island, Malpelo Island, and the Galapagos. It is a deep-water species recorded as occurring down to about 150 m (490 ft). This species grows to 16.2 cm (6.4 in) in standard length. This species was previously treated as the only known member of the genus Sagittalarva.
