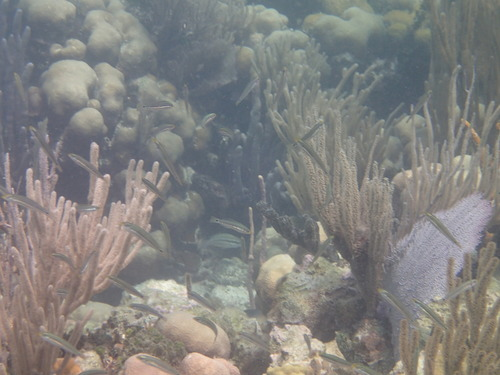

Conservation status
- Endangered (IUCN 3.1)

Scientific classification
- Kingdom: Animalia
- Phylum: Chordata
- Class: Actinopterygii
- Order: Labriformes
- Family: Labridae
- Genus: Halichoeres
- Species: H. socialis

Binomial name
- Halichoeres socialis Randall & Lobel, 2003

= Halichoeres socialis =

Species of fish

Halichoeres socialis, the social wrasse, is an endangered species of salt water wrasse found in Belize. They are found mainly in the mangrove forests in the Pelican Cays along said coast. These fish are absent from mangroves and reefs farther from the shore. They live close to the shore from a depth of 0-7 m (~22.9 ft) and over a variety of substrates such as sand, coral, rocks, or seagrass. When threatened, these fish group up into schools and swim away from the threat. This is unlike the more solo diving behaviors found in other members of this genus. They are currently being threatened by pollution and invasive lionfish species.

== Description ==
=== Appearance ===
From the snout to the base of the caudal fin, the males were 29.0–34.6 mm while females were 27.5–36.4 mm in length. Females, juveniles, and Initial phase males all share the same appearance. They are pale green on top and light grey on the bottom with a set of three stripes running down the middle that terminate at the base of the caudal fin where there is a black ocellus. The top stripe is a dark brown and starts at the tip of the snout while the middle stripe is bright white and starts from underneath or just behind the eye. Lastly, the bottom stripe starts at the base of the pectoral fin and terminates at the same place as the other two stripes.

Terminal phase males are much more colorful than their female counterparts. They become a yellowish green with a lighter green ventral area. Their dorsal and anal fins are red with bright blue dots lining the base and the top outlined in the same bright blue. The pelvic and caudal fins remain mostly clear with a darker red spot occurring at their base. The caudal fin also has a series of bright blue dots that form a three sided box around the darker red dot. This box also has two sets of horizontal stripes running through it. There are two sets of stripes running the length of the terminal phase male’s body. One starts just above the maxilla, passes back under the eye and ends at the base of the pectoral fin. After that, the line breaks up into a series of bright blue dots that continue toward the caudal fin, eventually forming the ventral part of the box. The second one starts just above the eye and proceeds towards the caudal fin, forming the dorsal part of the box.

=== Lifecycle ===
The females lay clear eggs that are about 0.5mm in diameter and quickly hatch into larvae. This larval stage lasts anywhere from 22 to 32 days before becoming juveniles. This is comparable to other Halichoeres species. Once juveniles, they grow at the relatively quick rate of 0.7 mm per day until reaching maturity. They then either spend their time in the initial phase in schools of other initial phase individuals or the males change into the terminal males and form small harems with 7-10 females.

These fish are planktivores that mainly consume zooplankton floating freely in the water column.

== Distribution ==
Halichoeres socialis have been recorded living in the Meso-American Barrier Reef lagoon off the coast of Belize. They prefer living in and around the reefs found near the inshore mangrove forests from Wee Wee Cay to the Pelican Cays and are absent from mangroves and reefs farther from the shore. There have been claimed sightings of these fish appearing as far away as Bahia Trujillo at Honduras, but there have been no formal recorded sightings of this species there. They have been found close to shore in the intertidal and neritic zones at depths of 0-7 m (~22.9 ft) over a variety of substrates such as sand, coral, rocks, or seagrass.

== Threats ==
This species is threatened both by increased pollution and the invasive lionfish that have invaded the area. Specifically, two species of lionfish were found to be invasive, Pterois volitans and P. miles. In a study that captured lionfish to check what species of fish they were consuming, it was found that 44% of the fish consumed was Halichoeres socialis and that they were found in 46% of the lionfish that had food in their stomachs, including a fully grown female. The authors suggested that this indicates that social wrasses are a preferred food for these invasive species and that even adults are at risk of predation. A separate study tried to estimate how many fish P. volitans could consume in a year and found that the minimum number of H. socialis they were likely to consume was 593

Halichoeres socialis was labeled as an endangered species in 2015 due to the population decline that occurred from the appearance of lionfish in the area and habitat fragmentation due to the dredging of corals and mangrove deforestation. As no protective measures are currently being enforced on their habitat and the lionfish population has not been controlled, this species’ population is likely to continue declining.

== Taxonomy ==
The social wrasse is part of the genus Halichoeres and the family Labridae which encompasses the wrasses.
