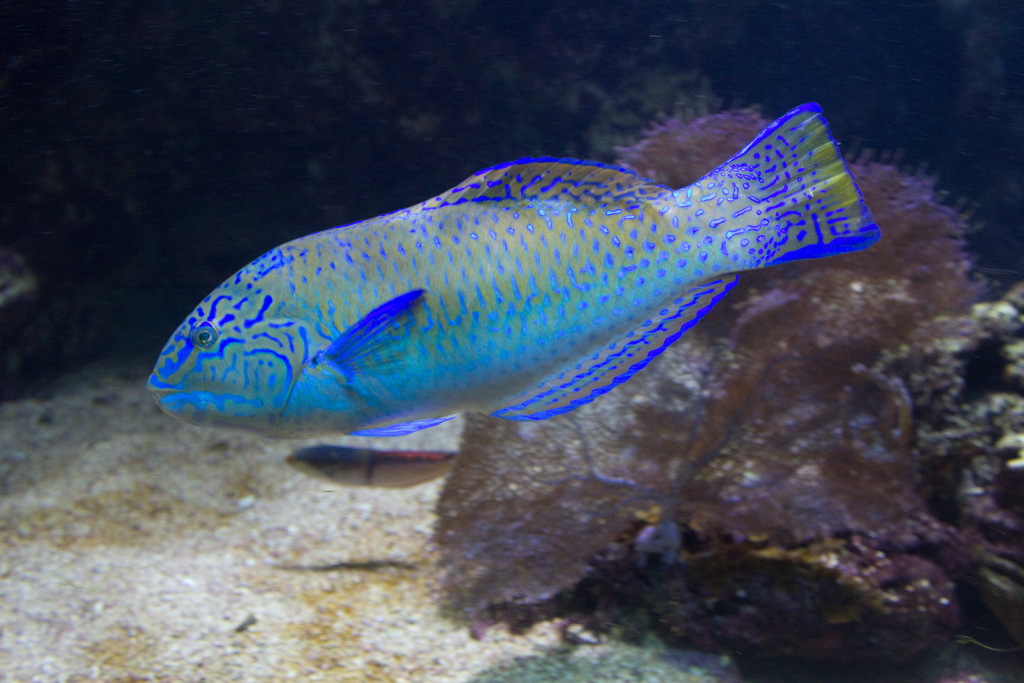

Conservation status
- Least Concern (IUCN 3.1)

Scientific classification
- Kingdom: Animalia
- Phylum: Chordata
- Class: Actinopterygii
- Order: Labriformes
- Family: Labridae
- Genus: Halichoeres
- Species: H. radiatus

Binomial name
- Halichoeres radiatus (Linnaeus, 1758)

Synonyms
- Labrus radiatus Linnaeus, 1758; Julis crotaphus Cuvier, 1829; Julis cyanostigma Valenciennes, 1839; Julis opalina Valenciennes, 1839; Julis patatus Valenciennes, 1839; Iridio elegans T. H. Bean, 1906; Halichoeres irideus torquatus Parr, 1930

= Puddingwife wrasse =

Species of fish

The puddingwife wrasse, Halichoeres radiatus, is a species of wrasse native to the western Atlantic Ocean from North Carolina to Bermuda, through the West Indies and Gulf of Mexico, to offshore islands of Brazil, being absent from Brazilian coastal waters. It can be found on reefs at depths from 2 to 55 m (6.6 to 180.4 ft), with younger fish up to subadults being found in much shallower waters from 1 to 5 m (3.3 to 16.4 ft). This species can reach 51 cm (20 in) in total length, though most do not exceed 40 cm (16 in). This species is of minor importance to local commercial fisheries and can be found in the aquarium trade.
