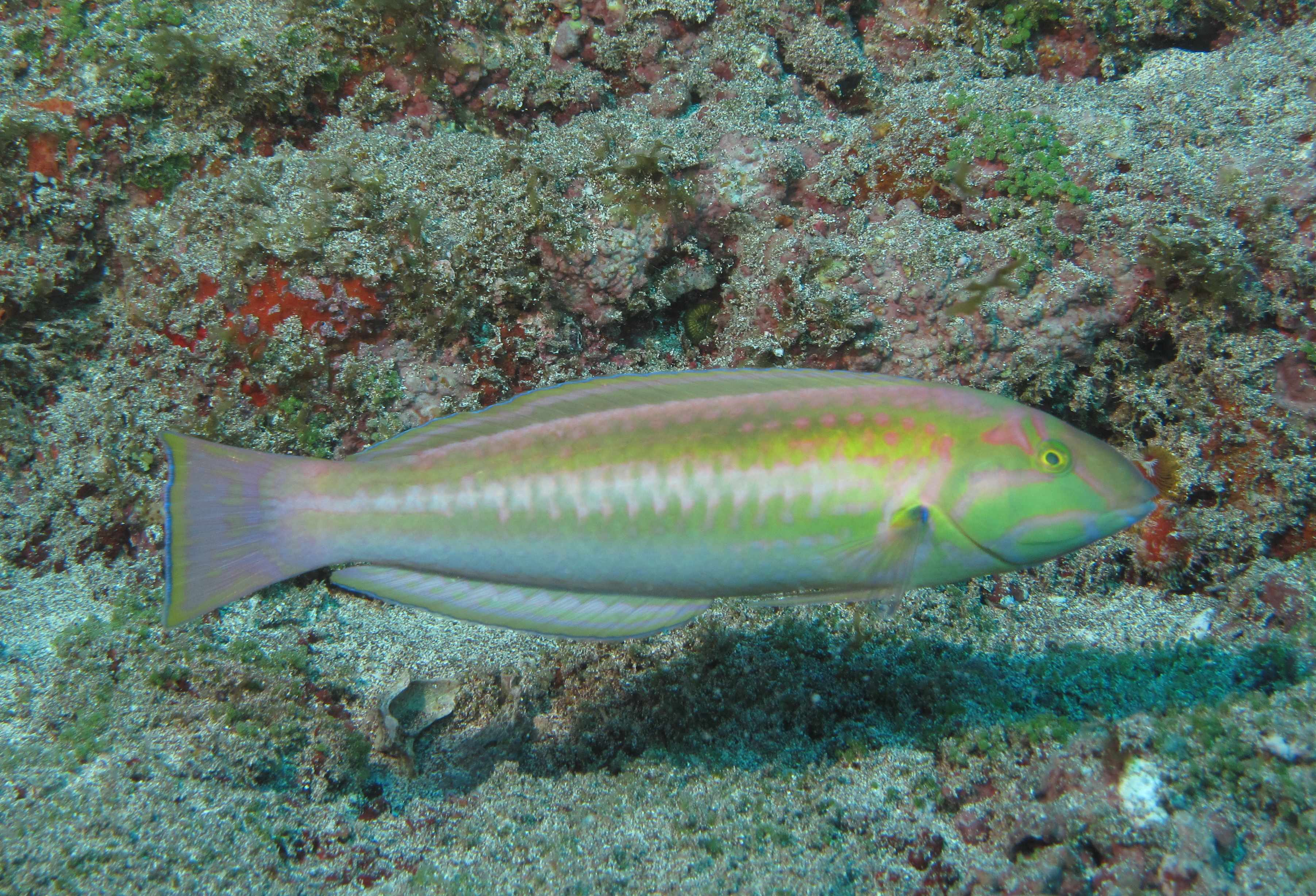

Scientific classification
- Kingdom: Animalia
- Phylum: Chordata
- Class: Actinopterygii
- Order: Labriformes
- Family: Labridae
- Genus: Halichoeres
- Species: H. rubrovirens

Binomial name
- Halichoeres rubrovirens L. A. Rocha, Pinheiro & Gasparini, 2010

= Halichoeres rubrovirens =

Species of wrasse

Halichoeres rubrovirens, the red-green wrasse, is a species of wrasse native to the western Atlantic Ocean, being found in the islands of Trindade and Martim Vaz in southeastern Brazil. It's found on rocky reefs at depths of 5-30m, and juveniles seem to mimic and usually school together with Thalassoma noronhanum which they resemble in color. They are not genetically close to any other species of Halichoeres in the Atlantic, and are likely a relict species.
