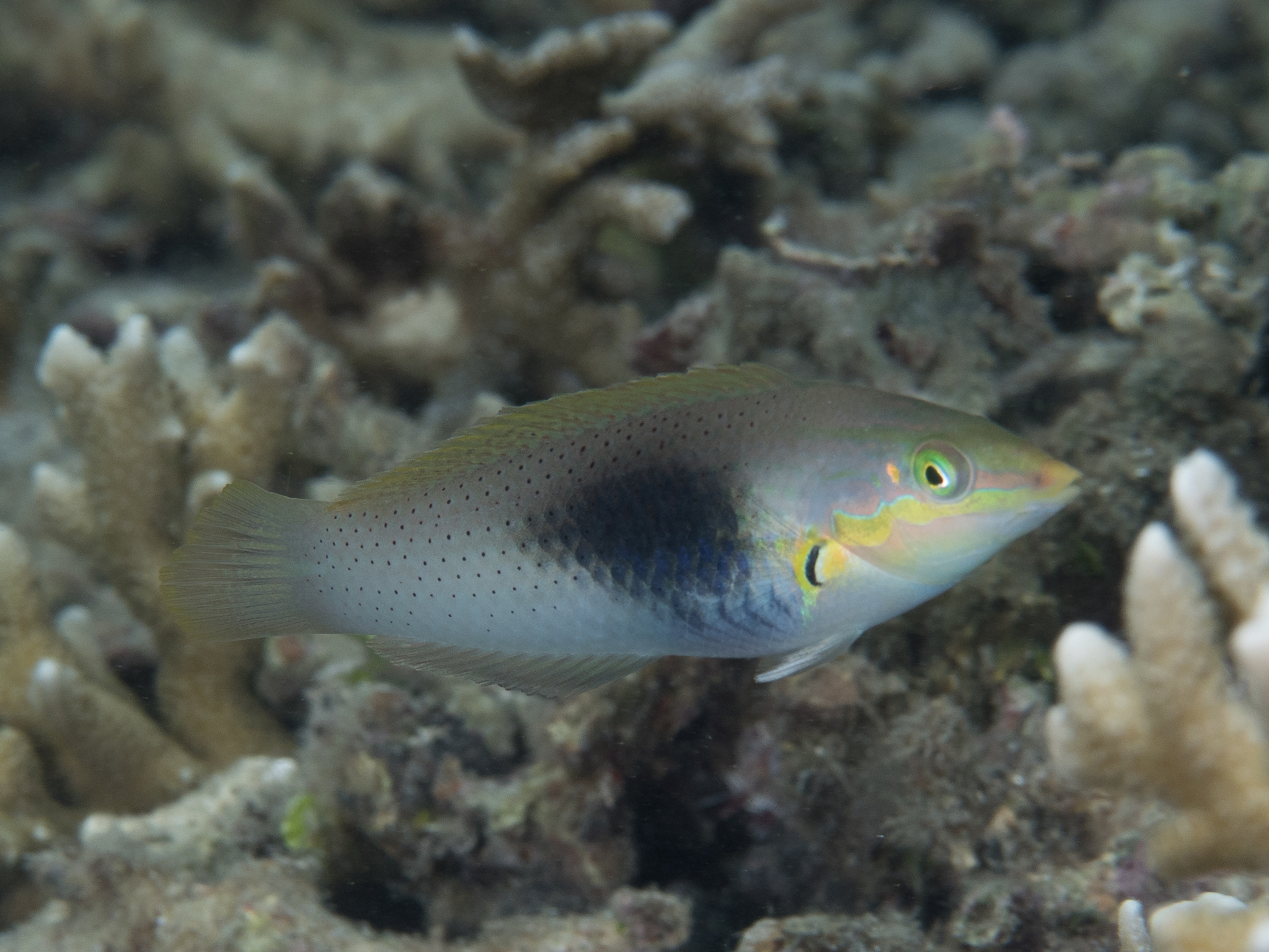
- Adult

Conservation status
- Least Concern (IUCN 3.1)

Scientific classification
- Kingdom: Animalia
- Phylum: Chordata
- Class: Actinopterygii
- Order: Labriformes
- Family: Labridae
- Genus: Halichoeres
- Species: H. chloropterus

Binomial name
- Halichoeres chloropterus (Bloch, 1791)

Synonyms
- Labrus chloropterus Bloch, 1791; Platyglossus chloropterus (Bloch, 1791); Labrus gymnocephalus Bloch & J. G. Schneider, 1801; Halichoeres gymnocephalus (Bloch & J. G. Schneider, 1801); Julis modestus Bleeker, 1847; Halichoeres modestus (Bleeker, 1847); Julis cuvieri Bleeker, 1847; Halichoeres bleekeri Günther, 1861; Platyglossus guttulatus W. J. Macleay, 1883

= Pastel-green wrasse =

Species of fish

The pastel-green wrasse (Halichoeres chloropterus), also known as the black-blotched rainbowfish, black-blotched wrasse, dark-blotch wrasse or green-spotted wrasse, is a species of wrasse native to the central western Pacific Ocean. It can be found on coral reefs and the surrounding areas at depths from the surface to 10 m (33 ft). Its coloration varies depending upon the habitat in which it occurs, ranging from bright green in fish living in areas with heavy algal growth to pale or with dark bars for those inhabiting rubble areas. This species can reach 19 cm (7.5 in) in standard length. It is of minor importance to local commercial fisheries and can be found in the aquarium trade.
