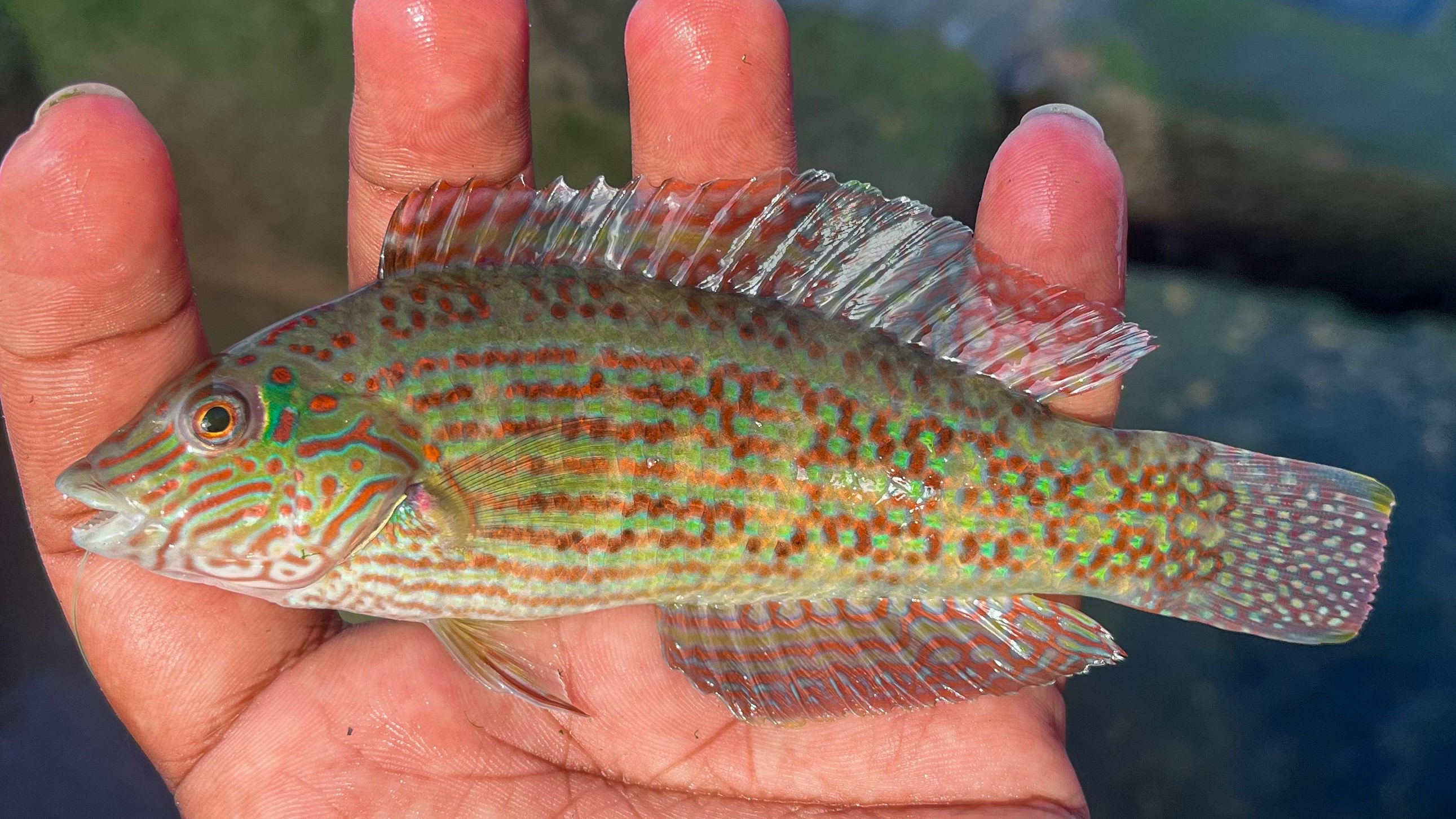

Conservation status
- Least Concern (IUCN 3.1)

Scientific classification
- Kingdom: Animalia
- Phylum: Chordata
- Class: Actinopterygii
- Order: Labriformes
- Family: Labridae
- Genus: Halichoeres
- Species: H. pardaleocephalus

Binomial name
- Halichoeres pardaleocephalus (Bleeker, 1849)

Synonyms
- Julis pardaleocephalus Bleeker, 1849

= Halichoeres pardaleocephalus =

Species of fish

Halichoeres pardaleocephalus, the lineblotch wrasse, is a species of salt water wrasse found in the Indo-West Pacific.

== Description ==
This species reaches a length of 11.2 cm (4.4 in).
