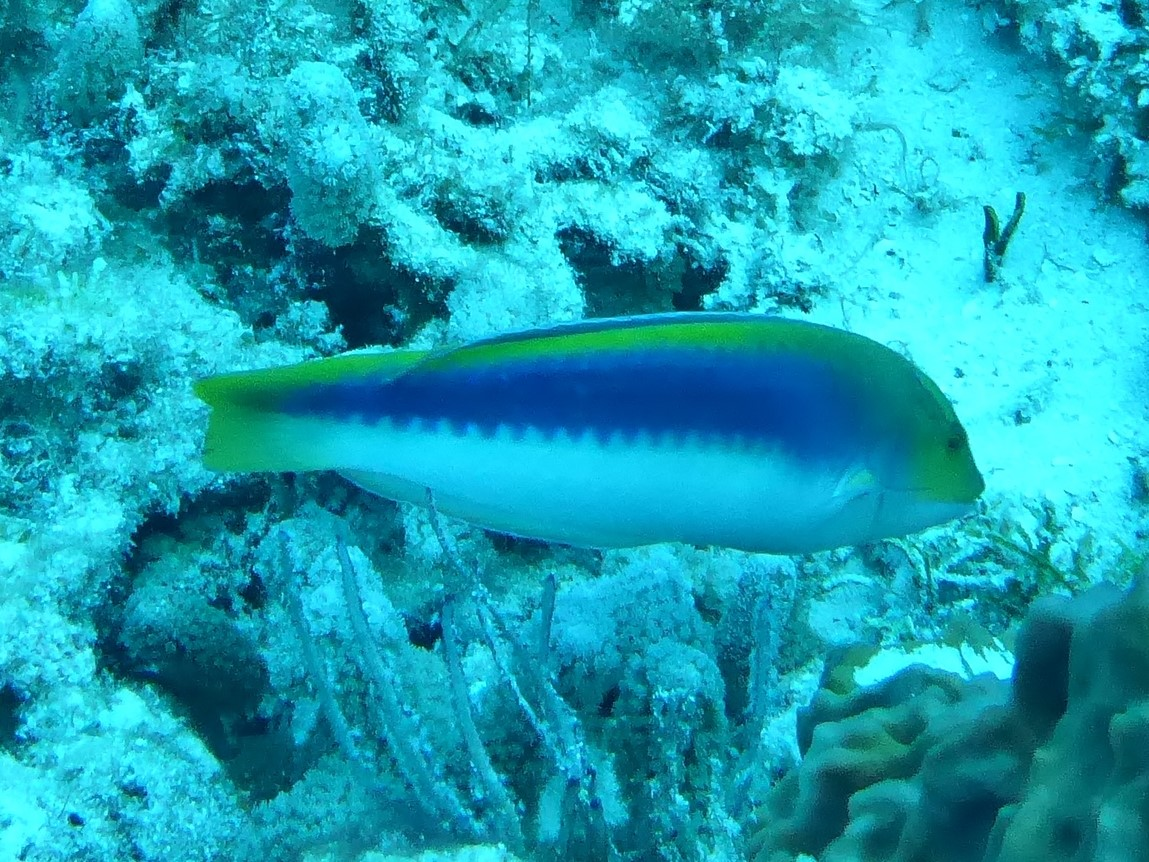

Conservation status
- Least Concern (IUCN 3.1)

Scientific classification
- Kingdom: Animalia
- Phylum: Chordata
- Class: Actinopterygii
- Order: Labriformes
- Family: Labridae
- Genus: Halichoeres
- Species: H. cyanocephalus

Binomial name
- Halichoeres cyanocephalus (Bloch, 1791)

Synonyms
- Labrus cyanocephalus Bloch, 1791

= Halichoeres cyanocephalus =

Species of fish

Halichoeres cyanocephalus, also called the lightning wrasse or the yellowcheek wrasse, is a species of salt water wrasse found in the western Atlantic Ocean, from Florida to Colombia.

== Description ==
This species reaches a length of 30.00 cm (11.81 in).
