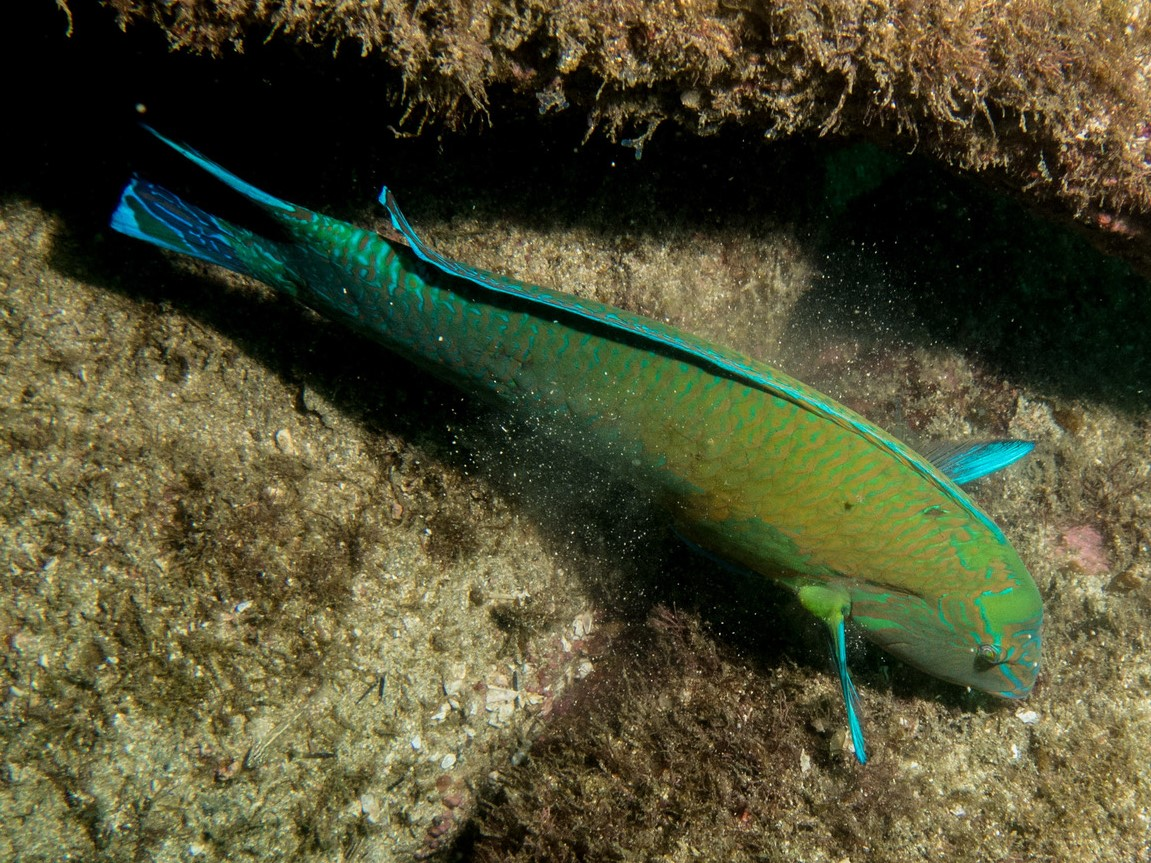

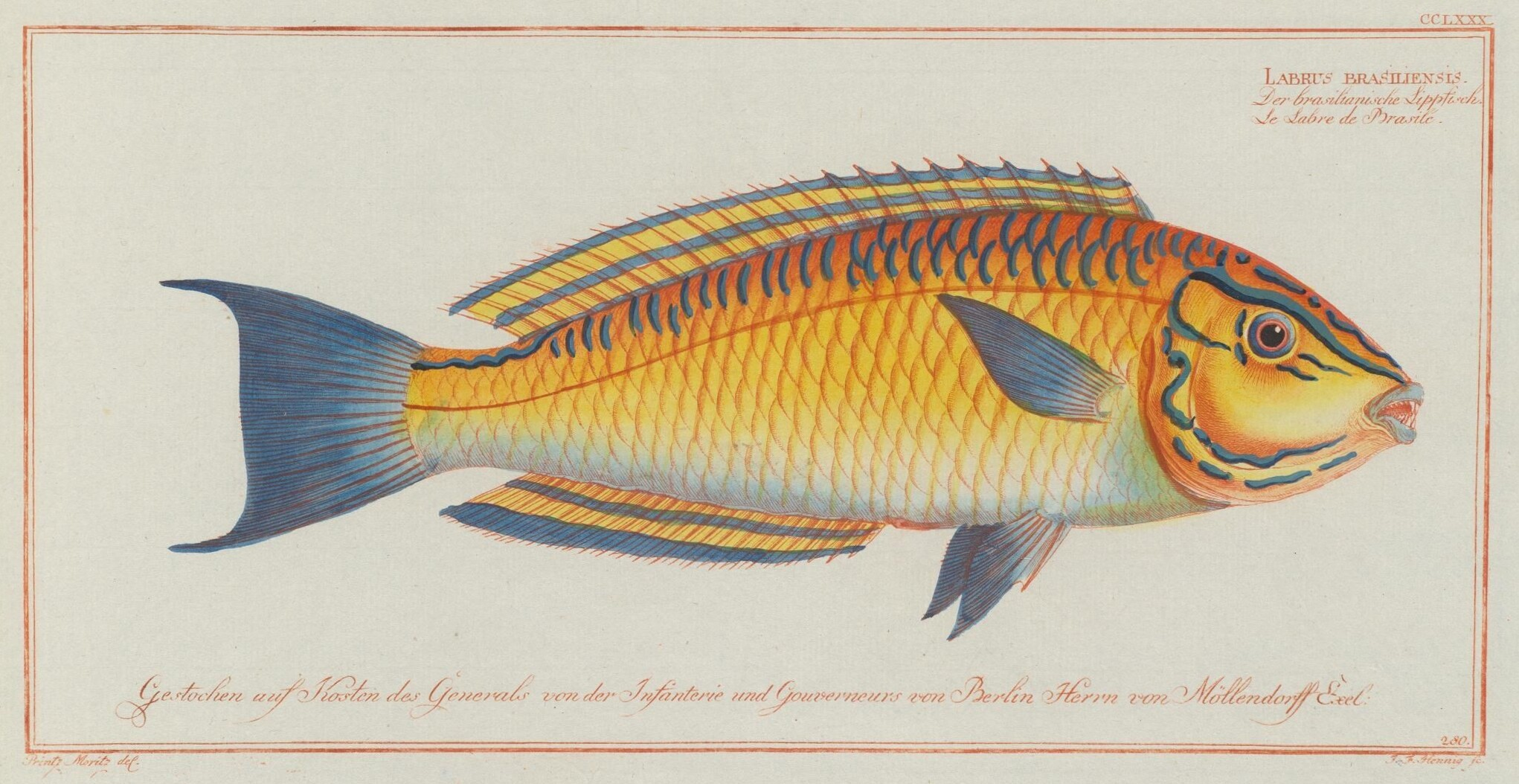

Conservation status
- Data Deficient (IUCN 3.1)

Scientific classification
- Kingdom: Animalia
- Phylum: Chordata
- Class: Actinopterygii
- Order: Labriformes
- Family: Labridae
- Genus: Halichoeres
- Species: H. brasiliensis

Binomial name
- Halichoeres brasiliensis (Bloch, 1791)

Synonyms
- Labrus brasiliensis Bloch, 1791; Julis principis Valenciennes, 1839; Halichoeres irideus Starks, 1913

= Halichoeres brasiliensis =

Species of fish

Halichoeres brasiliensis, or the Brazilian wrasse, is a species of salt water wrasse found in the south-western Atlantic Ocean, from Brazil to Trinidad Island.

== Description ==
This species reaches a length of 39.5 cm (15.6 in).
