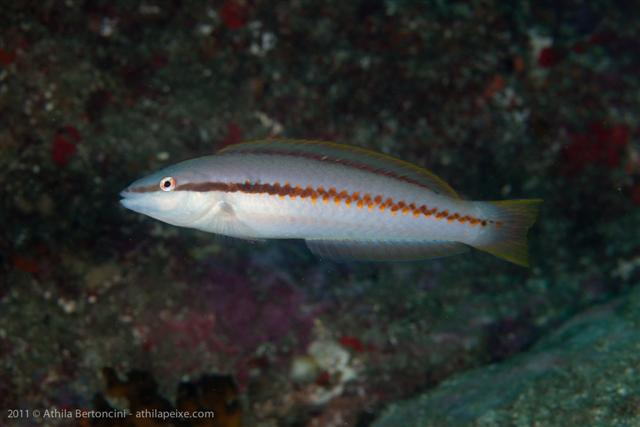

Scientific classification
- Domain: Eukaryota
- Kingdom: Animalia
- Phylum: Chordata
- Class: Actinopterygii
- Order: Labriformes
- Family: Labridae
- Genus: Halichoeres
- Species: H. sazimai

Binomial name
- Halichoeres sazimai Luiz, Ferreira & Rocha, 2009

= Halichoeres sazimai =

Species of fish

Halichoeres sazimai, Sazima's wrasse, is a species of fish in the family Labridae found in deeper (20m+) and cooler waters off southeastern Brazil. It's closely related to the north Atlantic species Halichoeres bathyphillus, but DNA evidence shows they are different. They are often found in small groups of 5-10 individuals around rocky reefs.
