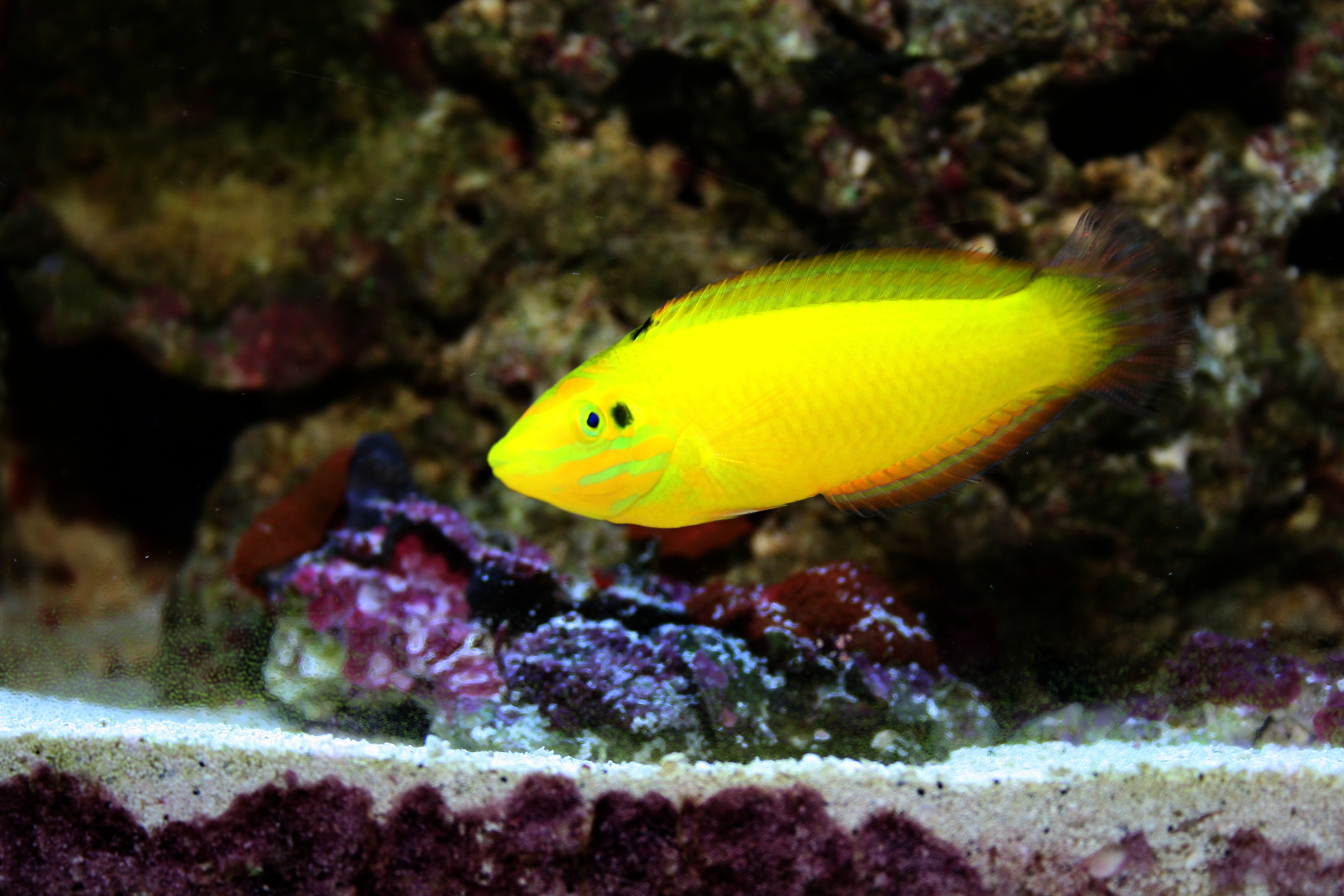

Conservation status
- Least Concern (IUCN 3.1)

Scientific classification
- Kingdom: Animalia
- Phylum: Chordata
- Class: Actinopterygii
- Order: Labriformes
- Family: Labridae
- Genus: Halichoeres
- Species: H. chrysus

Binomial name
- Halichoeres chrysus Randall, 1981

= Halichoeres chrysus =

Species of fish

Halichoeres chrysus, commonly called the canary wrasse, golden wrasse or yellow wrasse, is a wrasse native to the central Indo-Pacific area.

Two canary wrasses swimming in an aquarium in Japan.

== Description ==
Halichoeres chrysus is a small fish that can reach a maximum length of 12 cm. It has a thin, elongate body with a terminal mouth. Body coloration is bright yellow with a few variations according to age. Juveniles and immature females have two black spots rimmed with white or light yellow on the dorsal fin and a third one between the caudal peduncle and the caudal fin; in contrast, matures females or young males only show the two black spots on the dorsal fin. Mature males display only the first black spot in the front of the dorsal fin, a lighter-colored spot just behind the eye and irregular greenish to pinkish bars on the face.

== Distribution and habitat ==
Halichoeres chrysus is quite widespread throughout the tropical and subtropical waters of the central Indo-Pacific, in an area bordered by the Christmas Islands and Indonesia, Japan, New South Wales and the Rowley Shoals, and Tonga and the Solomon Islands. This wrasse occurs on outside reef slopes, in rubble and sandy areas from surface down to a depth of 30 m.

== Biology ==
Halichoeres chrysus lives in small groups. It is a benthic predator that feeds mainly on small marine invertebrates such as crustaceans, molluscs, worms and echinoderms captured on or in the substrate.

Like most wrasses, Halichoeres chrysus is a protogynous hermaphrodite, i.e. individuals start life as females with the capability of turning male later on.

== Conservation status ==
On the IUCN Red List, Halichoeres chrysus is listed as a Least Concern Species. It is targeted but not thought to be threatened by the aquarium trade.
