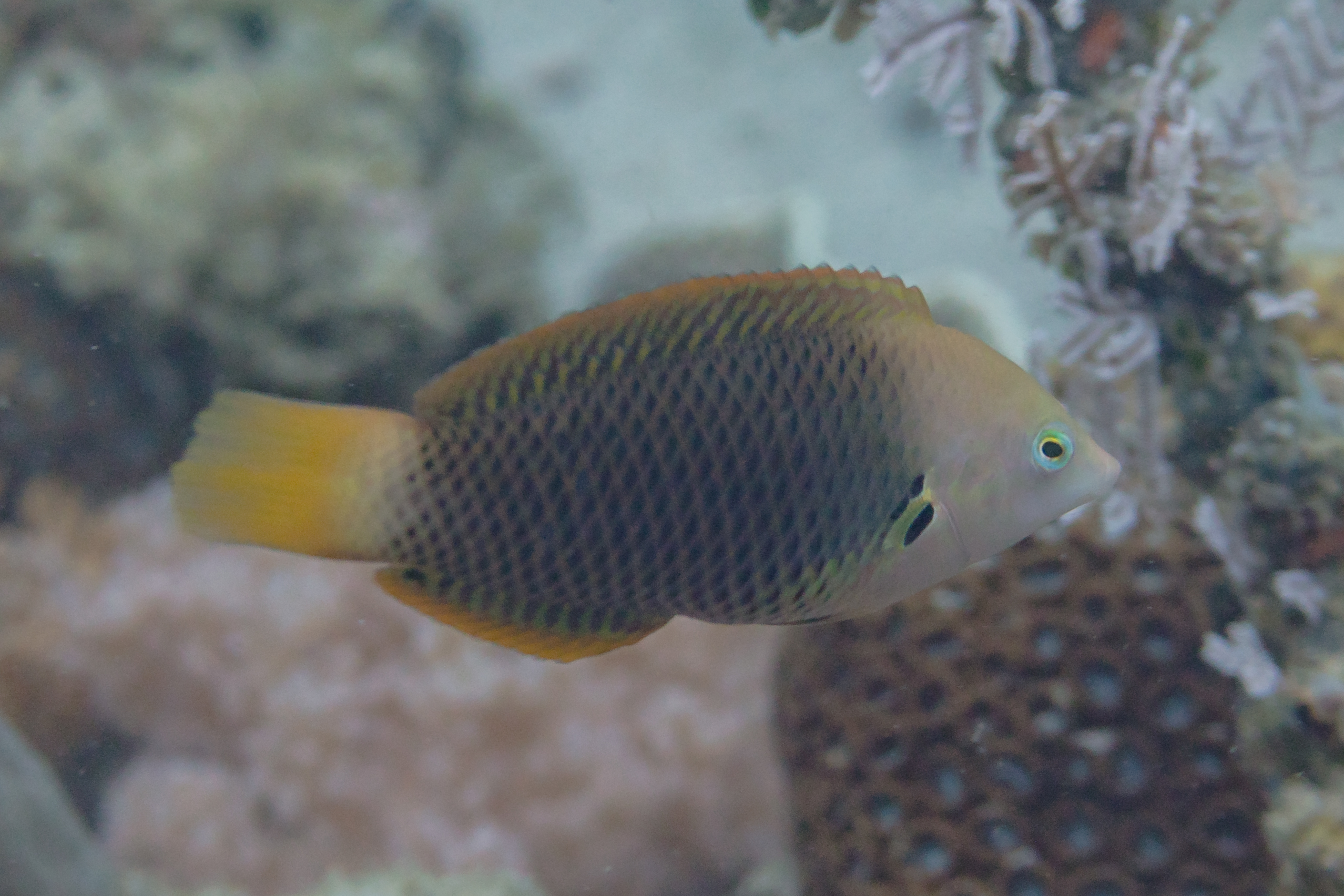

Conservation status
- Least Concern (IUCN 3.1)

Scientific classification
- Kingdom: Animalia
- Phylum: Chordata
- Class: Actinopterygii
- Order: Labriformes
- Family: Labridae
- Genus: Halichoeres
- Species: H. podostigma

Binomial name
- Halichoeres podostigma (Bleeker, 1854)

Synonyms
- Julis podostigma Bleeker, 1854

= Halichoeres podostigma =

Species of fish

Halichoeres podostigma, the axil spot wrasse, is a species of saltwater wrasse found in the western-central Pacific Ocean.

== Description ==
This species reaches a length of 18.5 cm (7.3 in).
