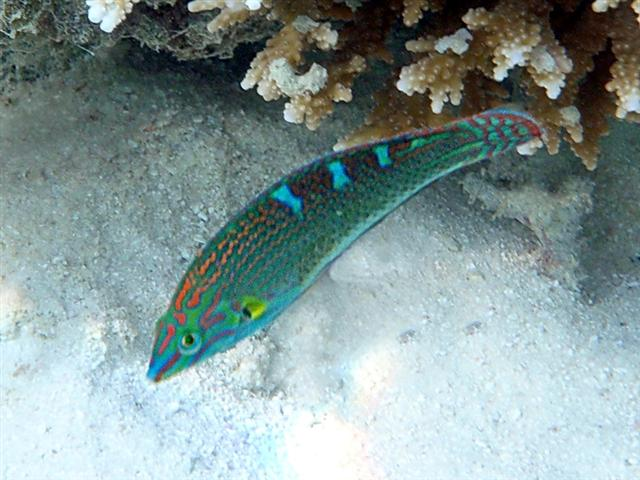

Conservation status
- Least Concern (IUCN 3.1)

Scientific classification
- Kingdom: Animalia
- Phylum: Chordata
- Class: Actinopterygii
- Order: Labriformes
- Family: Labridae
- Genus: Halichoeres
- Species: H. chrysotaenia

Binomial name
- Halichoeres chrysotaenia (Bleeker, 1853)

Synonyms
- Julis chrysotaenia Bleeker, 1853; Julis vrolikii Bleeker, 1855; Halichoeres vrolikii (Bleeker, 1855)

= Halichoeres chrysotaenia =

Species of fish

Halichoeres chrysotaenia, common name Indian Ocean pinstriped wrasse, is a wrasse native to the Indo-West Pacific. It inhabits waters off rocky shorelines but seems to avoid areas of rich coral growth.
