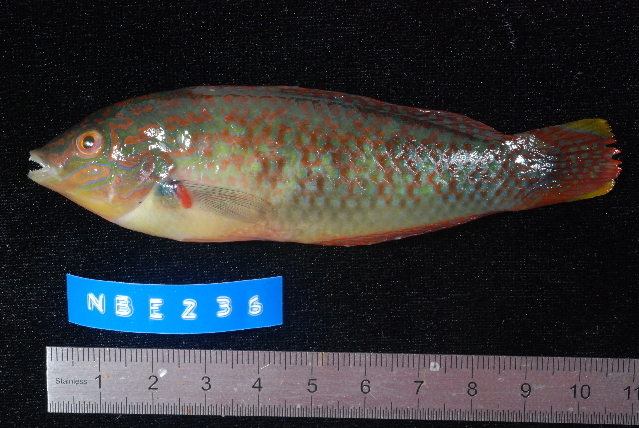

Conservation status
- Least Concern (IUCN 3.1)

Scientific classification
- Kingdom: Animalia
- Phylum: Chordata
- Class: Actinopterygii
- Order: Labriformes
- Family: Labridae
- Genus: Halichoeres
- Species: H. nigrescens

Binomial name
- Halichoeres nigrescens (Bloch & J. G. Schneider, 1801)

Synonyms
- List: Labrus nigrescens Bloch & Schneider, 1801; Halichoeres nigriscens (Bloch & Schneider, 1801); Labrus baccatus Marion de Procé, 1822; Labrus mola Cuvier, 1829; Julis dussumieri Valenciennes, 1839; Halichoeres dussumieri (Valenciennes, 1839); Julis exornatus Richardson, 1846; Julis javanicus Bleeker, 1857; Platyglossus dubius Steindachner, 1866; Platyglossus dayi Steindachner, 1870; Platyglossus ransonneti Steindachner, 1870; Platyglossus immaculatus Macleay, 1878; Platyglossus amabilis De Vis, 1885; Platyglossus roseus Day, 1888; Platyglossus maculatus Jatzow & Lenz, 1898; Halichoeres leucostigma Fowler & Bean, 1928; Halichoeres dianthus Smith, 1947

= Halichoeres nigrescens =

Species of fish

Halichoeres nigrescens, or the bubblefin wrasse, is a species of salt water wrasse found in the Indo-West Pacific Ocean.

== Description ==
This species reaches a length of 14.0 cm (5.5 in).
