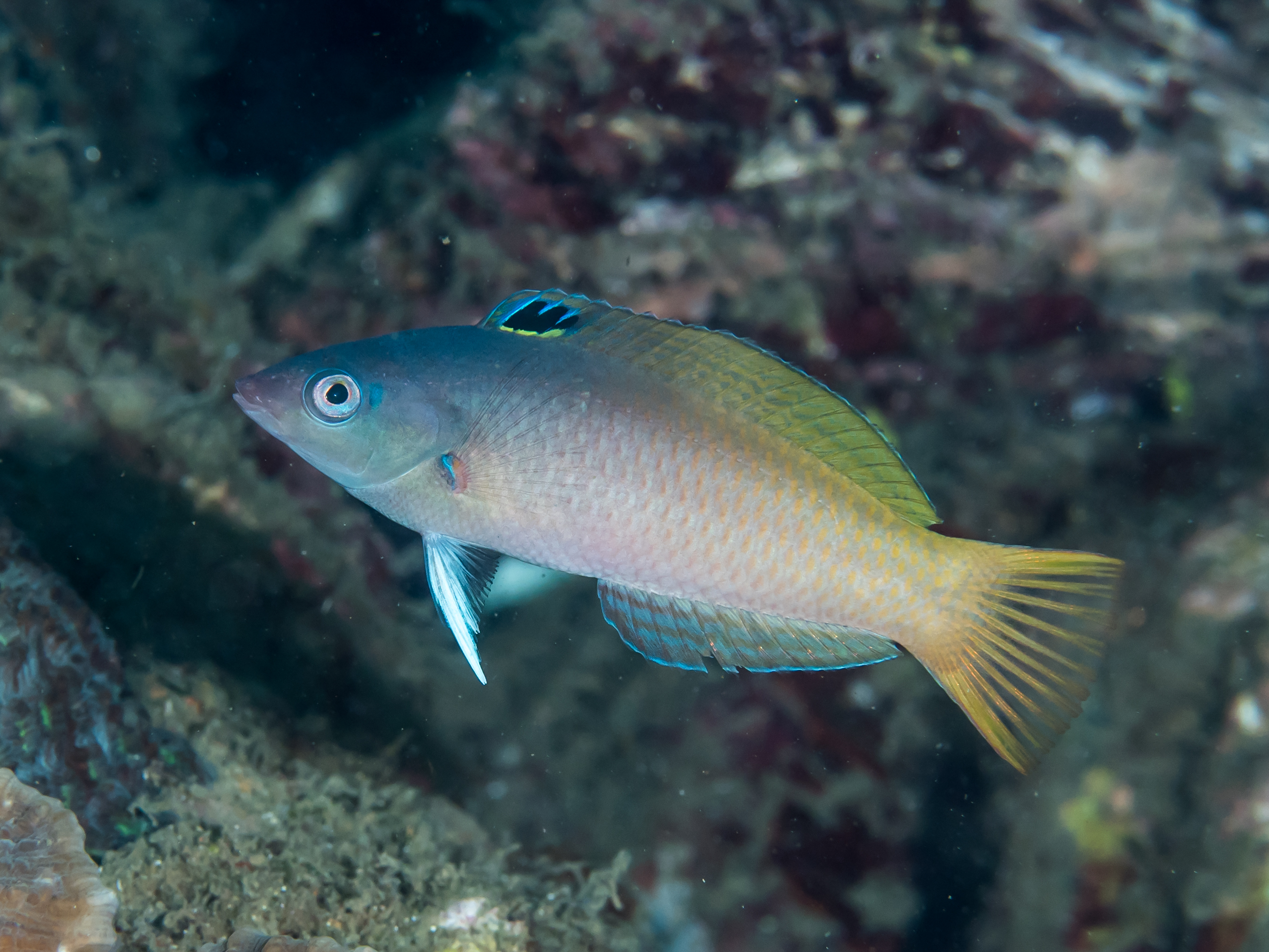
- adult
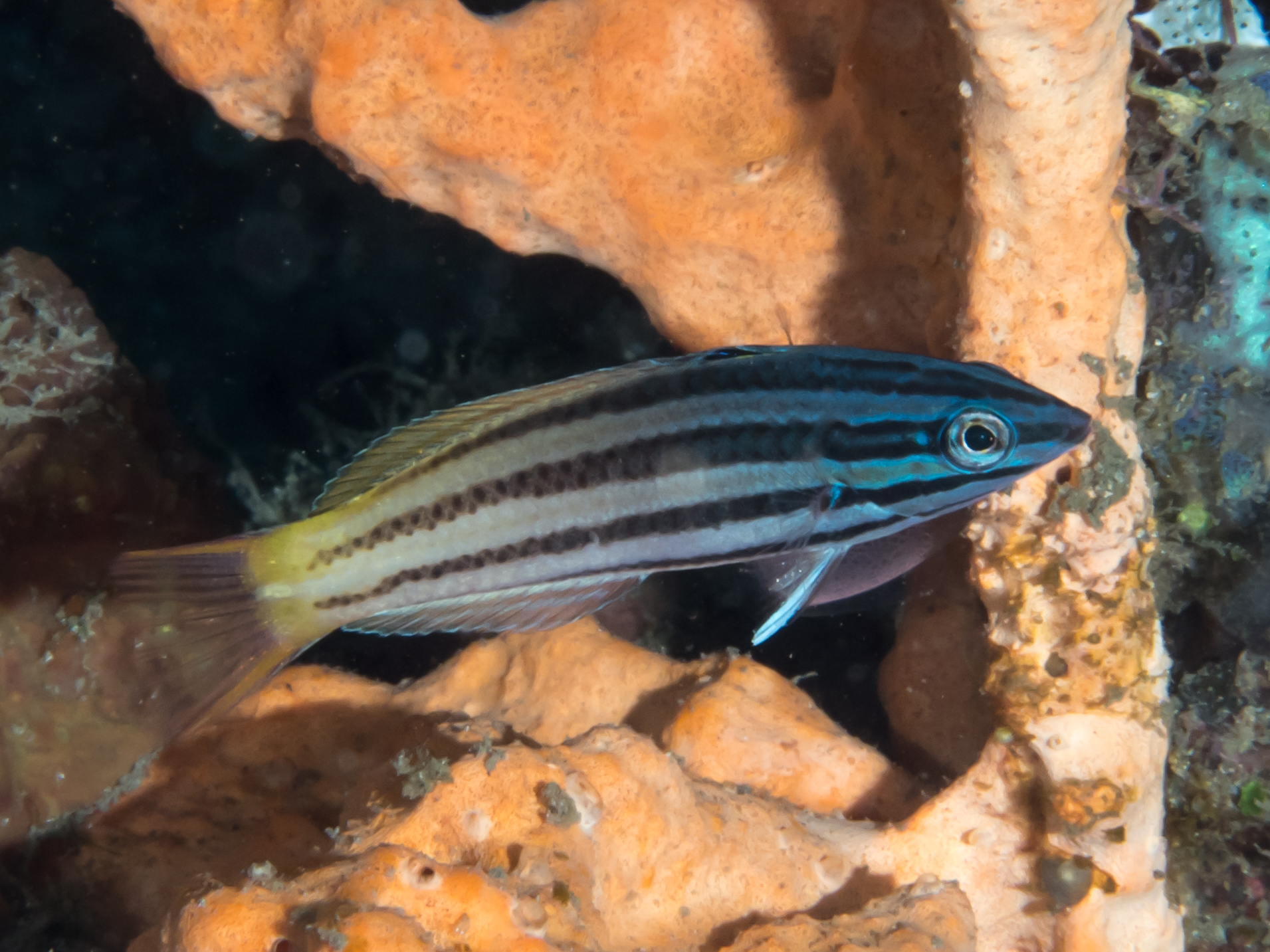
- juvenile

Conservation status
- Least Concern (IUCN 3.1)

Scientific classification
- Kingdom: Animalia
- Phylum: Chordata
- Class: Actinopterygii
- Order: Labriformes
- Family: Labridae
- Genus: Halichoeres
- Species: H. prosopeion

Binomial name
- Halichoeres prosopeion (Bleeker, 1853)

Synonyms
- Julis prosopeion Bleeker, 1853

= Halichoeres prosopeion =

Species of fish

Halichoeres prosopeion, commonly called the twotone wrasse, half-grey wrasse or zig-zag wrasse, is a fish species in the wrasse family native to the western Pacific Ocean.

== Description ==
The twotone wrasse is a small fish that can reach a maximum length of 13 cm. It has a thin, elongate body with a terminal mouth.

Body coloration has few variations according to age and distribution area.

In Australia and eastern Papua New Guinea, the juveniles have a white body with four black stripes from snout to the tip of the caudal fin. In the rest of the distribution area, juveniles have also a white body with the four black stripes but these later are not reaching the tip of the tail. In this case, the caudal fin and the peduncle are yellow.

Then, for both sex and all areas the body coloration is quite the same. Grey-blue for the anterior part of the body and yellowish for the posterior part with a slight gradient at the junction. A dark spot occurs on the first rays of the dorsal fin.

== Distribution & habitat ==
The half-grey wrasse is widespread throughout the tropical and subtropical waters of the western Pacific Ocean, from Indonesia to Philippines through French New-Caledonia and south Japan.

This wrasse occurs on outside reef slopes and lagoons in rich coral reef area from surface down to a depth of 40 meters.

== Biology ==
The twotone wrasse lives solitary. It is a benthic predator that feeds mainly on small marine invertebrates such as crustaceans, molluscs, worms and echinoderms captured on or in the substrate.

Like most wrasse, the twotone wrasse is a protogynous hermaphrodite, i.e. individuals start life as females with the capability of turning male later on.

== Conservation status ==
The species is targeted but not thought to be threatened by the aquarium trade.
