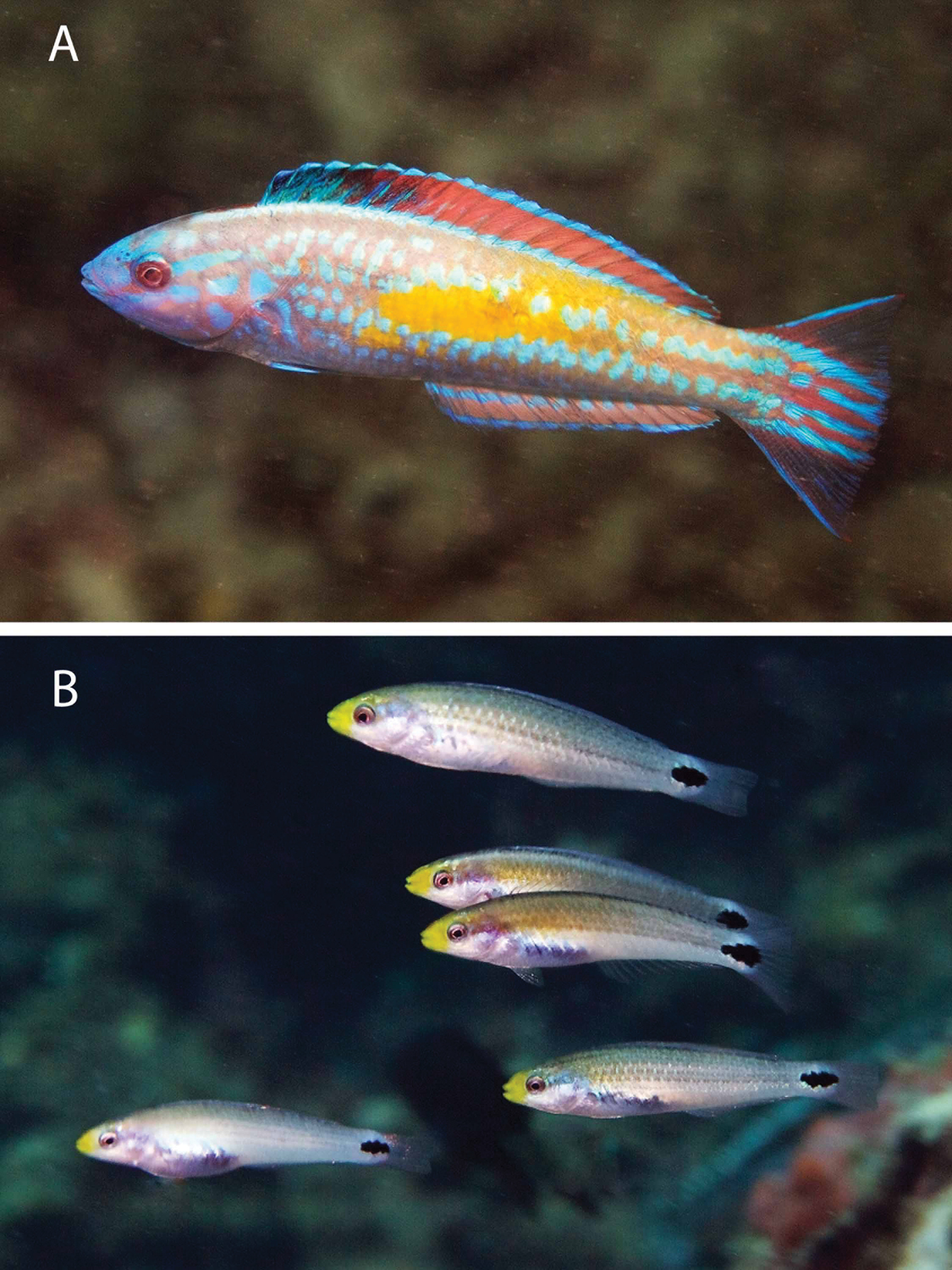

Conservation status
- Endangered (IUCN 3.1)

Scientific classification
- Kingdom: Animalia
- Phylum: Chordata
- Class: Actinopterygii
- Division: Teleostei
- Order: Labriformes
- Family: Labridae
- Genus: Halichoeres
- Species: H. burekae

Binomial name
- Halichoeres burekae Weaver & L. A. Rocha, 2007

= Halichoeres burekae =

Species of fish

Halichoeres burekae, known as the Mardi Gras wrasse, is a species of wrasse native to the Gulf of Mexico. The species was first described from the Flower Garden Banks National Marine Sanctuary, in the northwestern Gulf of Mexico, but has since been recorded in other areas of the southern Gulf of Mexico. Because it is a small species that feeds on plankton in the water column, it is likely a preferred prey for invasive Lionfish. It also has a very restricted range, and corresponding relatively small population, what resulted in this species being listed as Endangered in the IUCN Red List.

== Etymology ==
The fish is named in honor of Joyce Burek.
