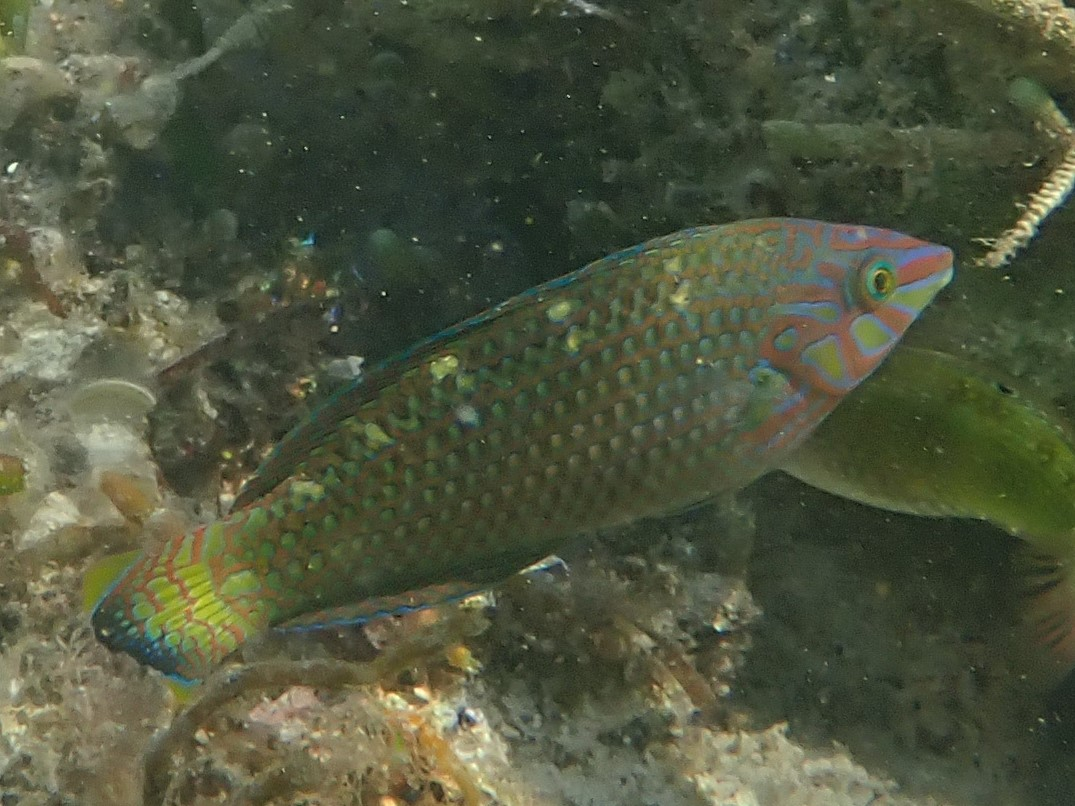

Conservation status
- Least Concern (IUCN 3.1)

Scientific classification
- Kingdom: Animalia
- Phylum: Chordata
- Class: Actinopterygii
- Division: Teleostei
- Order: Labriformes
- Family: Labridae
- Genus: Halichoeres
- Species: H. argus

Binomial name
- Halichoeres argus (Bloch & J. G. Schneider, 1801)

Synonyms
- Labrus argus Bloch & Schneider, 1801; Labrus guttatus Bloch, 1791; Labrus guttulatus Lacépède, 1801; Julis polyophthalmus Bleeker, 1853; Julis leparensis Bleeker, 1853; Halichoeres leparensis (Bleeker, 1853); Halichoeres fijiensis Herre, 1935

= Halichoeres argus =

Species of fish

Halichoeres argus, or the Argus wrasse, is a species of salt water wrasse found in the Indo-West Pacific Ocean from Sri Lanka to Fiji and Tonga, then north to Taiwan, south to northern Australia.

== Description ==
This species reaches a length of 12.0 cm (4.7 in).
