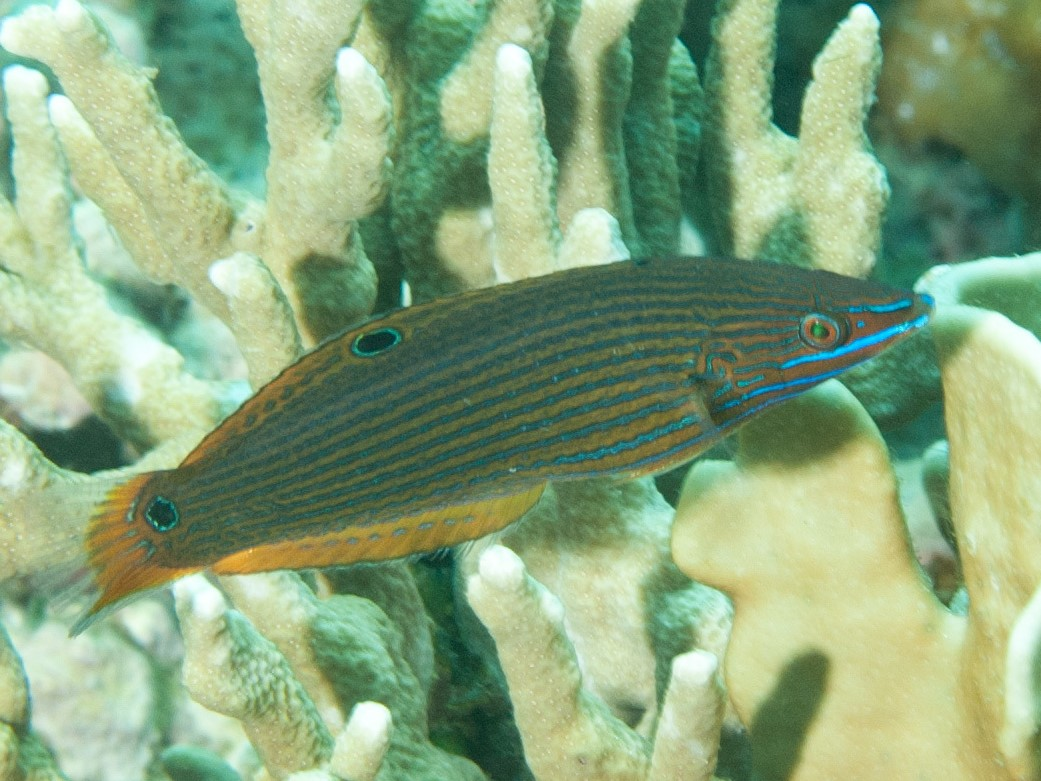

Conservation status
- Least Concern (IUCN 3.1)

Scientific classification
- Kingdom: Animalia
- Phylum: Chordata
- Class: Actinopterygii
- Order: Labriformes
- Family: Labridae
- Genus: Halichoeres
- Species: H. kallochroma

Binomial name
- Halichoeres kallochroma (Bleeker, 1853)

Synonyms
- Julis kallochroma Bleeker, 1853

= Halichoeres kallochroma =

Species of fish

Halichoeres kallochroma is a saltwater species of wrasse found in the eastern Indian Ocean.

== Description ==
This species reaches a length of 12.0 cm (4.7 in).
