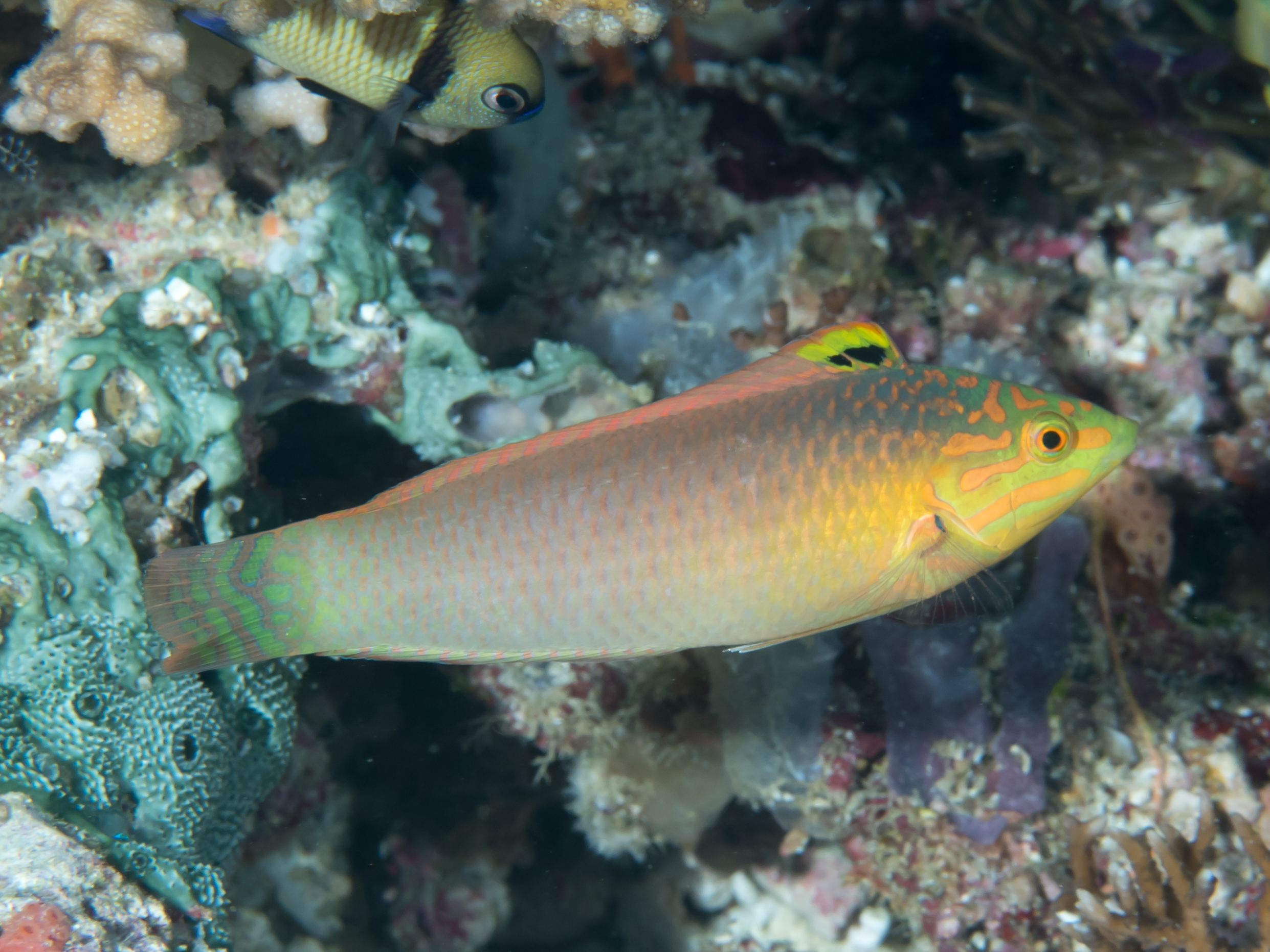

Conservation status
- Least Concern (IUCN 3.1)

Scientific classification
- Kingdom: Animalia
- Phylum: Chordata
- Class: Actinopterygii
- Order: Labriformes
- Family: Labridae
- Genus: Halichoeres
- Species: H. solorensis

Binomial name
- Halichoeres solorensis (Bleeker, 1853)

Synonyms
- Julis solorensis Bleeker, 1853

= Halichoeres solorensis =

Species of fish

Halichoeres solorensis, the green wrasse, is a species of salt water wrasse found in the western Pacific Ocean.

Their depth range is 10 to 40 meters. They are found in coastal reefs and lagoons, frequently in sand-rubble substrate with large staghorn coral colonies.

They are non-migratory, and their diet consists of benthic invertebrates.

== Description ==
This species reaches a length of 18.0 cm (7.1 in). They are recognized by their dusky yellow color.
