= Triplespot wrasse =

Conservation status
- Least Concern (IUCN 3.1)

Scientific classification
- Kingdom: Animalia
- Phylum: Chordata
- Class: Actinopterygii
- Order: Labriformes
- Family: Labridae
- Genus: Halichoeres
- Species: H. trispilus

Binomial name
- Halichoeres trispilus J. E. Randall & M. M. Smith, 1982

Species of fish

The triplespot wrasse (Halichoeres trispilus), also known as the white wrasse, is a species of wrasse native to the western Indian Ocean from South Africa to the Maldives and Mauritius. This species prefers areas of sandy substrates around reefs and can be found at depths from 15 to 56 m (49 to 184 ft). It can reach 9.5 cm (3.7 in) in total length.
