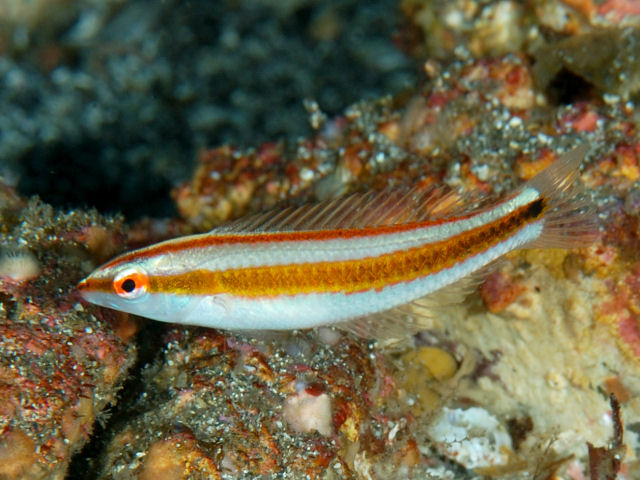

Conservation status
- Least Concern (IUCN 3.1)

Scientific classification
- Kingdom: Animalia
- Phylum: Chordata
- Class: Actinopterygii
- Order: Labriformes
- Family: Labridae
- Genus: Halichoeres
- Species: H. hartzfeldii

Binomial name
- Halichoeres hartzfeldii (Bleeker, 1849)

Synonyms
- Julis hartzfeldii Bleeker, 1852; Halichoeres hardzfeldi (Bleeker, 1852); Halichoeres hartzfeldi (Bleeker, 1852)

= Halichoeres hartzfeldii =

Species of fish

Halichoeres hartzfeldii, also known as Hartzfeld's wrasse, is a species of salt water wrasse found in the western Pacific Ocean.

== Description ==
This species reaches a length of 18.0 cm (7.1 in).

== Etymology ==
The fish is named in honor of German physician Joseph Hartzfeld (1815–1885), the Principal Medical Officer of the Royal Dutch East Indies Army, who collected the type specimen, and whose collections, improved the scientific knowledge of the fish fauna of the Ambon Islands.
