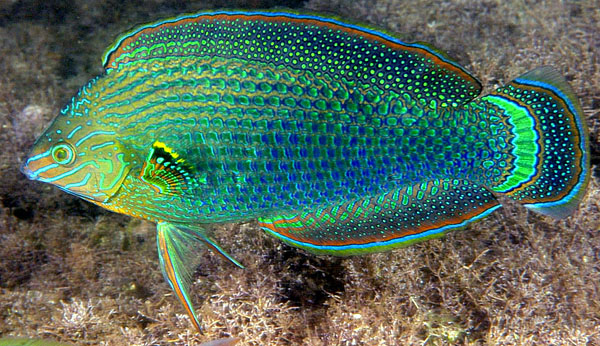
- Halichoeres marginatus
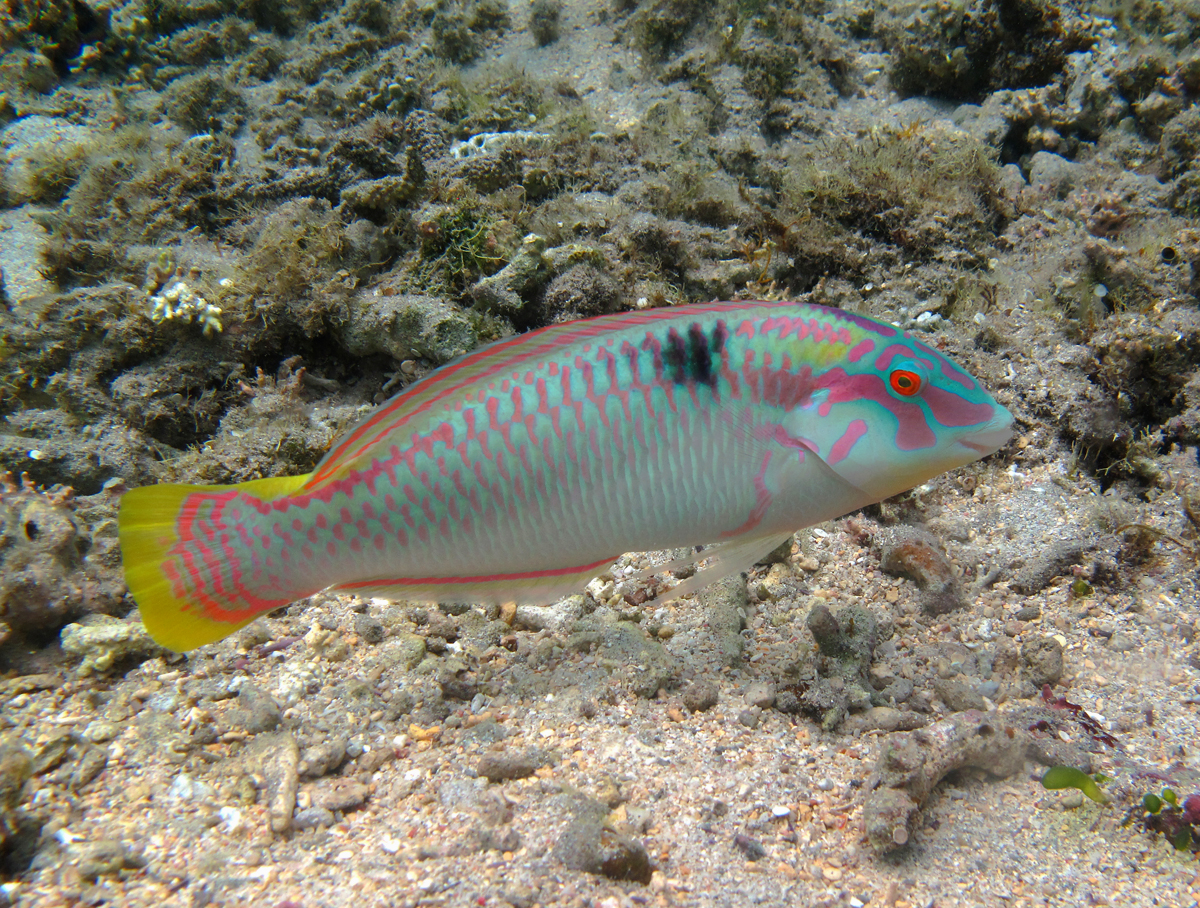
- Halichoeres scapularis

Scientific classification
- Kingdom: Animalia
- Phylum: Chordata
- Class: Actinopterygii
- Division: Teleostei
- Order: Labriformes
- Family: Labridae
- Subfamily: Julidinae
- Genus: Halichoeres; Rüppell, 1835

Type species
- Halichoeres bimaculatus Rüppell, 1835

Synonyms
- List: Artisia de Beaufort, 1939; Biochoeres Kuiter, 2010; Choerojulis Gill, 1862; Guentheria Bleeker, 1862; Hemitautoga Bleeker, 1862; Hemiulis Swainson, 1839; Iridio Jordan & Evermann, 1896; Julichoeres Kuiter, 2010; Octocynodon Fowler, 1904; Oxyjulis Gill, 1863; Platyglossus Bleeker, 1862; Pseudojulis Bleeker, 1862; Pusa Jordan & Gilbert, 1879; Sagittalarva Victor, Alfaro & Sorenson, 2013; Whitleychoeres Kuiter, 2010

= Halichoeres =

Genus of fishes

Halichoeres are a genus of wrasses found in the Atlantic, Indian and Pacific Oceans.

== Taxonomy ==
Molecular phylogenetic studies have repeatedly found the genus Halichoeres to be polyphyletic. As a result, this genus requires significant taxonomic revision.

== Species ==
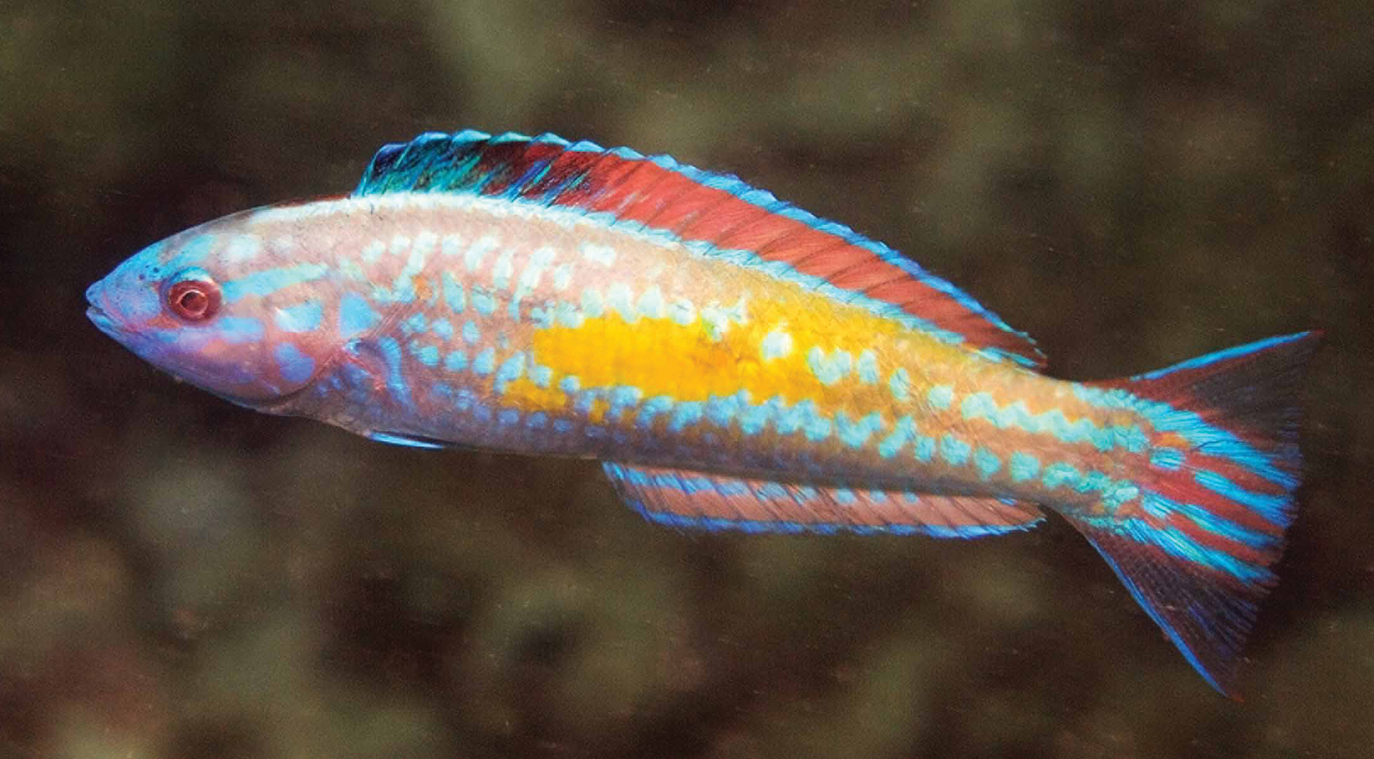
H. burekae

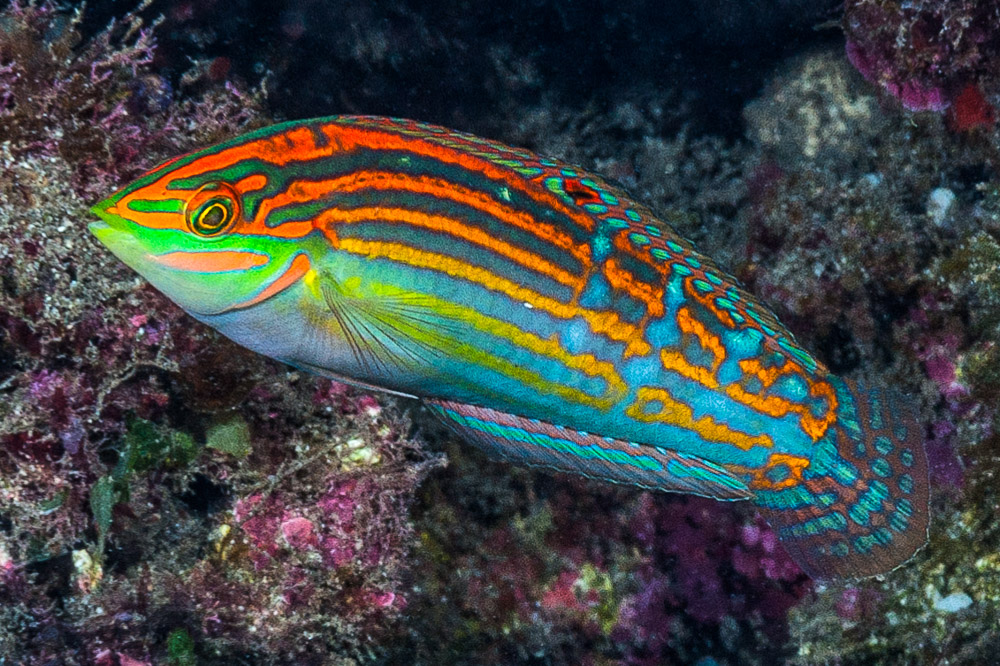
H. cosmetus

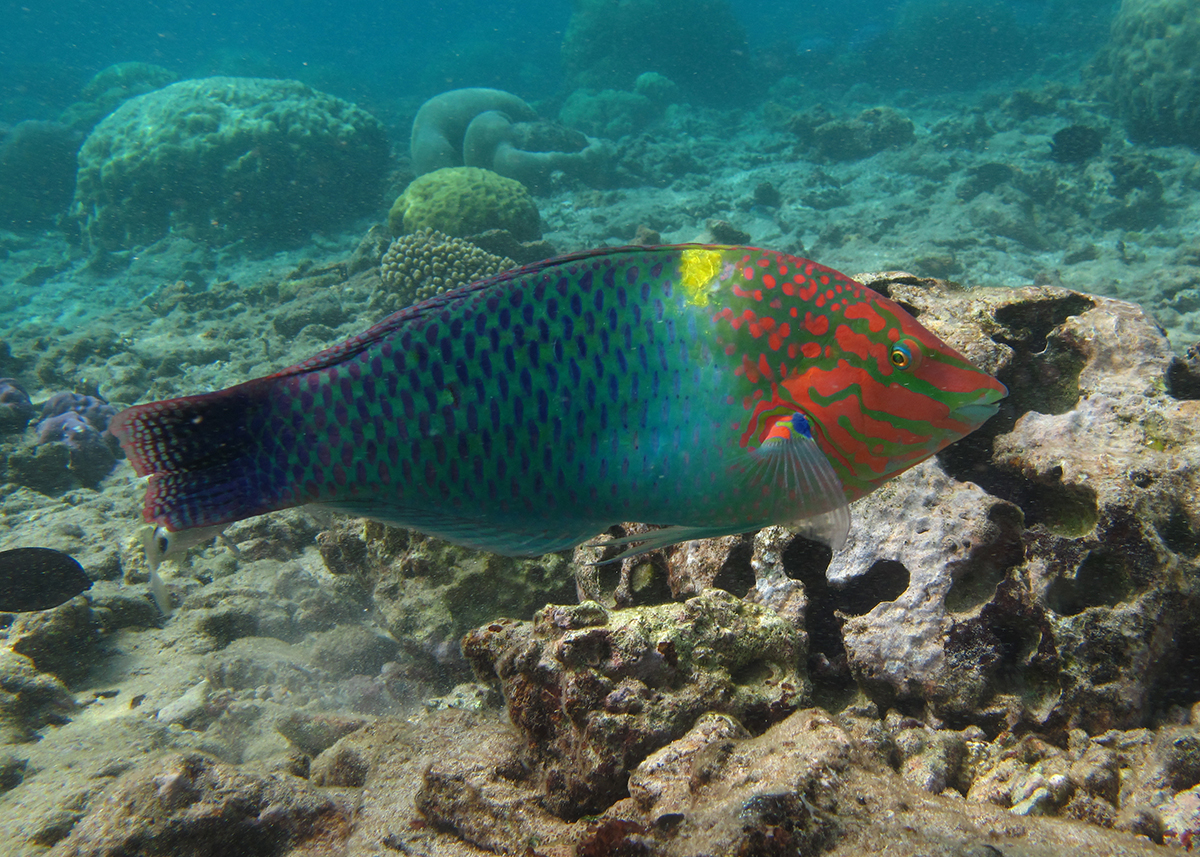
H. hortulanus

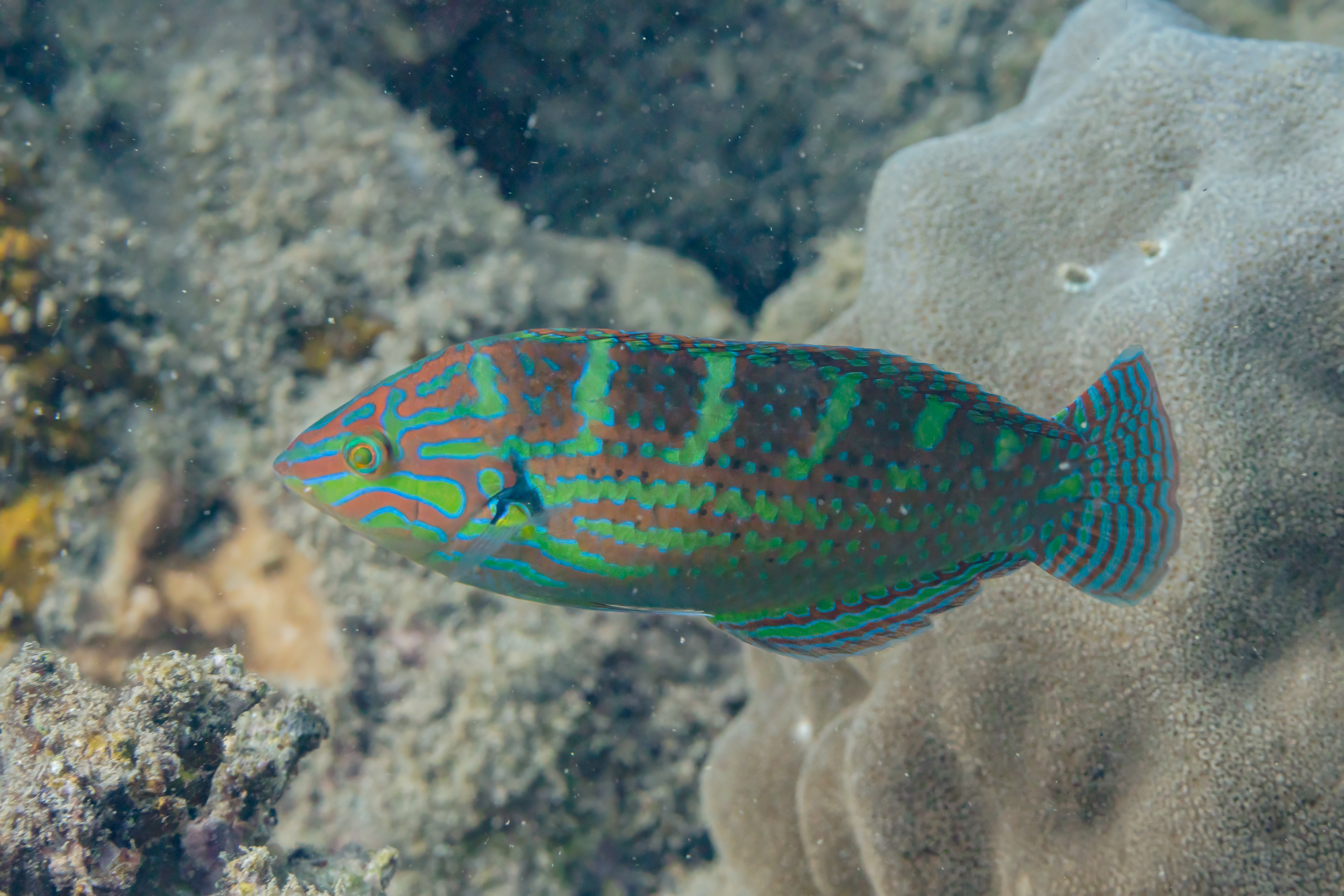
H. margaritaceus

There are currently 88 recognized species in this genus:

- Halichoeres adustus (C. H. Gilbert, 1890) (Black wrasse)
- Halichoeres aestuaricola W. A. Bussing, 1972 (Mangrove wrasse)
- Halichoeres annularis (Valenciennes, 1839)
- Halichoeres argus (Bloch & J. G. Schneider, 1801) (Argus wrasse)
- Halichoeres bathyphilus (Beebe & Tee-Van, 1932) (Green-band wrasse)
- Halichoeres bicolor (Bloch & J. G. Schneider, 1801) (Pearly-spotted wrasse)
- Halichoeres binotopsis (Bleeker, 1849) (Saowisata wrasse)
- Halichoeres biocellatus L. P. Schultz, 1960 (Red-lined wrasse)
- Halichoeres bivittatus (Bloch, 1791) (Slippery dick)
- Halichoeres bleekeri (Steindachner & Döderlein (de), 1887)
- Halichoeres brasiliensis (Bloch, 1791) (Brazilian wrasse)
- Halichoeres brownfieldi (Whitley, 1945) (Brownfield's wrasse)
- Halichoeres burekae Weaver & L. A. Rocha, 2007 (Mardi Gras wrasse)
- Halichoeres californicus Günther, 1861 (Señorita)
- Halichoeres caudalis (Poey, 1860) (Painted wrasse)
- Halichoeres chierchiae di Caporiacco, 1948 (Wounded wrasse)
- Halichoeres chlorocephalus Kuiter & J. E. Randall, 1995 (Green-head wrasse)
- Halichoeres chloropterus (Bloch, 1791) (Pastel-green wrasse)
- Halichoeres chrysotaenia (Bleeker, 1853) (Indian Ocean pinstriped wrasse)
- Halichoeres chrysus J. E. Randall, 1981 (Canary wrasse)
- Halichoeres claudia J. E. Randall & L. A. Rocha, 2009 (Claudia's wrasse)
- Halichoeres cosmetus J. E. Randall & M. M. Smith, 1982 (Adorned wrasse)
- Halichoeres cyanocephalus (Bloch, 1791) (Yellow-cheek wrasse)
- Halichoeres dimidiatus (Agassiz, 1831)
- Halichoeres discolor W. A. Bussing, 1983 (Cocos wrasse)
- Halichoeres dispilus (Günther, 1864) (Chameleon wrasse)
- Halichoeres dussumieri (Valenciennes, 1839)
- Halichoeres erdmanni J. E. Randall & G. R. Allen, 2010 (Erdmann's wrasse)
- Halichoeres garnoti (Valenciennes, 1839) (Yellow-head wrasse)
- Halichoeres gurrobyi Victor, 2016 (Black-saddle wrasse)
- Halichoeres hartzfeldii (Bleeker, 1852) (Hartzfeld's wrasse)
- Halichoeres hilomeni J. E. Randall & G. R. Allen, 2010 (Hilomen's wrasse)
- Halichoeres hortulanus (Lacépède, 1801) (Checker-board wrasse)
- Halichoeres inornatus (Gilbert, 1890)
- Halichoeres insularis G. R. Allen & D. R. Robertson, 1992 (Socorro wrasse)
- Halichoeres iridis J. E. Randall & M. M. Smith, 1982
- Halichoeres kallochroma (Bleeker, 1853) (Pink-snout wrasse)
- Halichoeres kneri Bleeker, 1862
- Halichoeres lamarii (Valenciennes, 1839)
- Halichoeres lapillus J. L. B. Smith, 1947 (Jewelled wrasse)
- Halichoeres leptotaenia J. E. Randall & Earle, 1994
- Halichoeres leucoxanthus J. E. Randall & M. M. Smith, 1982 (Canary-top wrasse)
- Halichoeres leucurus (Walbaum, 1792) (Grey-head wrasse)
- Halichoeres maculipinna (J. P. Müller & Troschel, 1848) (Clown wrasse)
- Halichoeres malpelo G. R. Allen & D. R. Robertson, 1992 (Malpelo wrasse)
- Halichoeres margaritaceus (Valenciennes, 1839) (Pink-belly wrasse)
- Halichoeres marginatus Rüppell, 1835 (Dusky wrasse)
- Halichoeres melanochir Fowler & B. A. Bean, 1928 (Orange-fin wrasse)
- Halichoeres melanotis (C. H. Gilbert, 1890) (Golden wrasse)
- Halichoeres melanurus (Bleeker, 1851) (Tail-spot wrasse)
- Halichoeres melas J. E. Randall & Earle, 1994
- Halichoeres melasmapomus J. E. Randall, 1981 (Cheek-spot wrasse)
- Halichoeres miniatus (Valenciennes, 1839) (Circle-cheek wrasse)
- Halichoeres nebulosus (Valenciennes, 1839) (Nebulous wrasse)
- Halichoeres nicholsi (D. S. Jordan & C. H. Gilbert, 1882) (Spinster wrasse)
- Halichoeres nigrescens (Bloch & J. G. Schneider, 1801) (Bubble-fin wrasse)
- Halichoeres notospilus (Günther, 1864) (Banded wrasse)
- Halichoeres orientalis J. E. Randall, 1999
- Halichoeres ornatissimus (A. Garrett, 1863) (Ornamented wrasse)
- Halichoeres pallidus Kuiter & J. E. Randall, 1995 (Pale wrasse)
- Halichoeres papilionaceus (Valenciennes, 1839) (Weed wrasse)
- Halichoeres pardaleocephalus (Bleeker, 1849) (Line-blotch wrasse)
- Halichoeres pelicieri J. E. Randall & M. M. Smith, 1982
- Halichoeres penrosei Starks, 1913
- Halichoeres pictus (Poey, 1860) (Rainbow wrasse)
- Halichoeres podostigma (Bleeker, 1854) (Axil-spot wrasse)
- Halichoeres poeyi (Steindachner, 1867) (Black-ear wrasse)
- Halichoeres prosopeion (Bleeker, 1853) (Two-tone wrasse)
- Halichoeres radiatus (Linnaeus, 1758) (Pudding-wife wrasse)
- Halichoeres richmondi Fowler & B. A. Bean, 1928 (Richmond's wrasse)
- Halichoeres rubricephalus Kuiter & J. E. Randall, 1995 (Red-head wrasse)
- Halichoeres rubrovirens L. A. Rocha, Pinheiro & Gasparini, 2010
- Halichoeres salmofasciatus G. R. Allen & D. R. Robertson, 2002 (Red-striped wrasse)
- Halichoeres sanchezi B. C. Victor, B. W. Frable & W. B. Ludt, 2024 (Tailspot wrasse)
- Halichoeres sazimai O. J. Luiz, C. E. L. Ferreira & L. A. Rocha, 2009
- Halichoeres scapularis (E. T. Bennett, 1832) (Zigzag wrasse)
- Halichoeres semicinctus (Ayres, 1859) (Rock wrasse)
- Halichoeres signifer J. E. Randall & Earle, 1994
- Halichoeres socialis J. E. Randall & Lobel, 2003
- Halichoeres solorensis (Bleeker, 1853) (Green wrasse)
- Halichoeres stigmaticus J. E. Randall & M. M. Smith, 1982 (U-spot wrasse)
- Halichoeres tenuispinis (Günther, 1862)
- Halichoeres timorensis (Bleeker, 1852) (Timor wrasse)
- Halichoeres trimaculatus (Quoy & Gaimard, 1834) (Three-spot wrasse)
- Halichoeres trispilus J. E. Randall & M. M. Smith, 1982 (Triple-spot wrasse)
- Halichoeres vrolikii (Bleeker, 1855)
- Halichoeres zeylonicus (E. T. Bennett, 1833) (Gold-stripe wrasse)
- Halichoeres zulu J. E. Randall & D. R. King, 2010 (KwaZulu-Natal wrasse)
