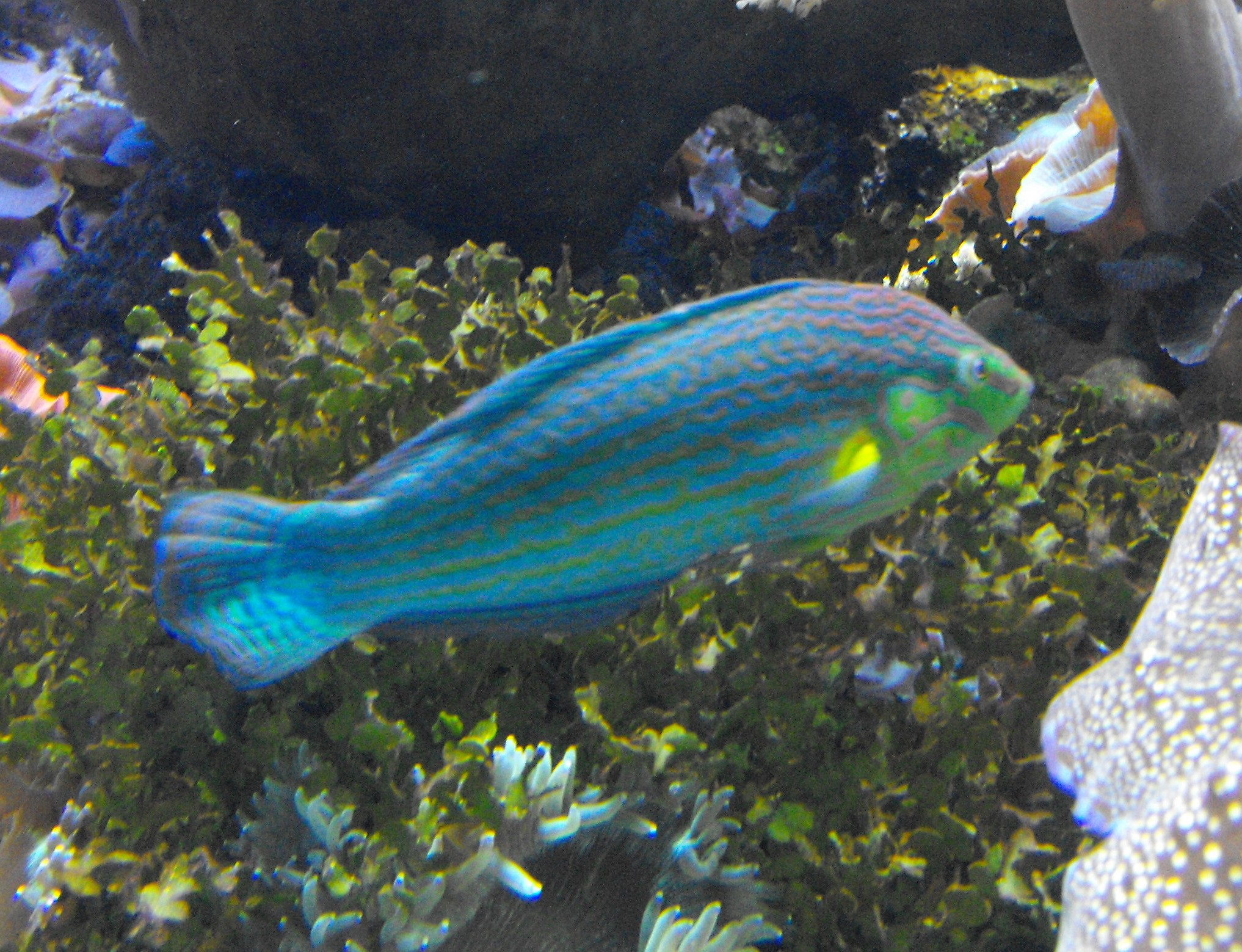

Conservation status
- Least Concern (IUCN 3.1)

Scientific classification
- Kingdom: Animalia
- Phylum: Chordata
- Class: Actinopterygii
- Order: Labriformes
- Family: Labridae
- Genus: Halichoeres
- Species: H. melanurus

Binomial name
- Halichoeres melanurus (Bleeker, 1851)

Synonyms
- Julis melanurus Bleeker, 1851; Platyglossus melanurus (Bleeker, 1851); Julis hoevenii Bleeker, 1851; Halichoeres hoevenii (Bleeker, 1851)

= Tail-spot wrasse =

Species of fish

The tail-spot wrasse, Halichoeres melanurus, is a species of wrasse in the western Pacific from Japan to Samoa and Tonga and south to the Great Barrier Reef. This species is found along rocky shores or on coral reefs at depths from 1 to 15 m (3.3 to 49.2 ft). It can reach 12 cm (4.7 in) in total length. This species is popular for display in public aquaria and can be found in the aquarium trade.

The male of the species is more vibrant in colour generally, and when placed in the vicinity of one or more females may "flash" his colours with dramatically increased intensity. The female can be easily differentiated from the male by the presence of ocelli markings (eye spots) on the dorsal and caudal fins.
