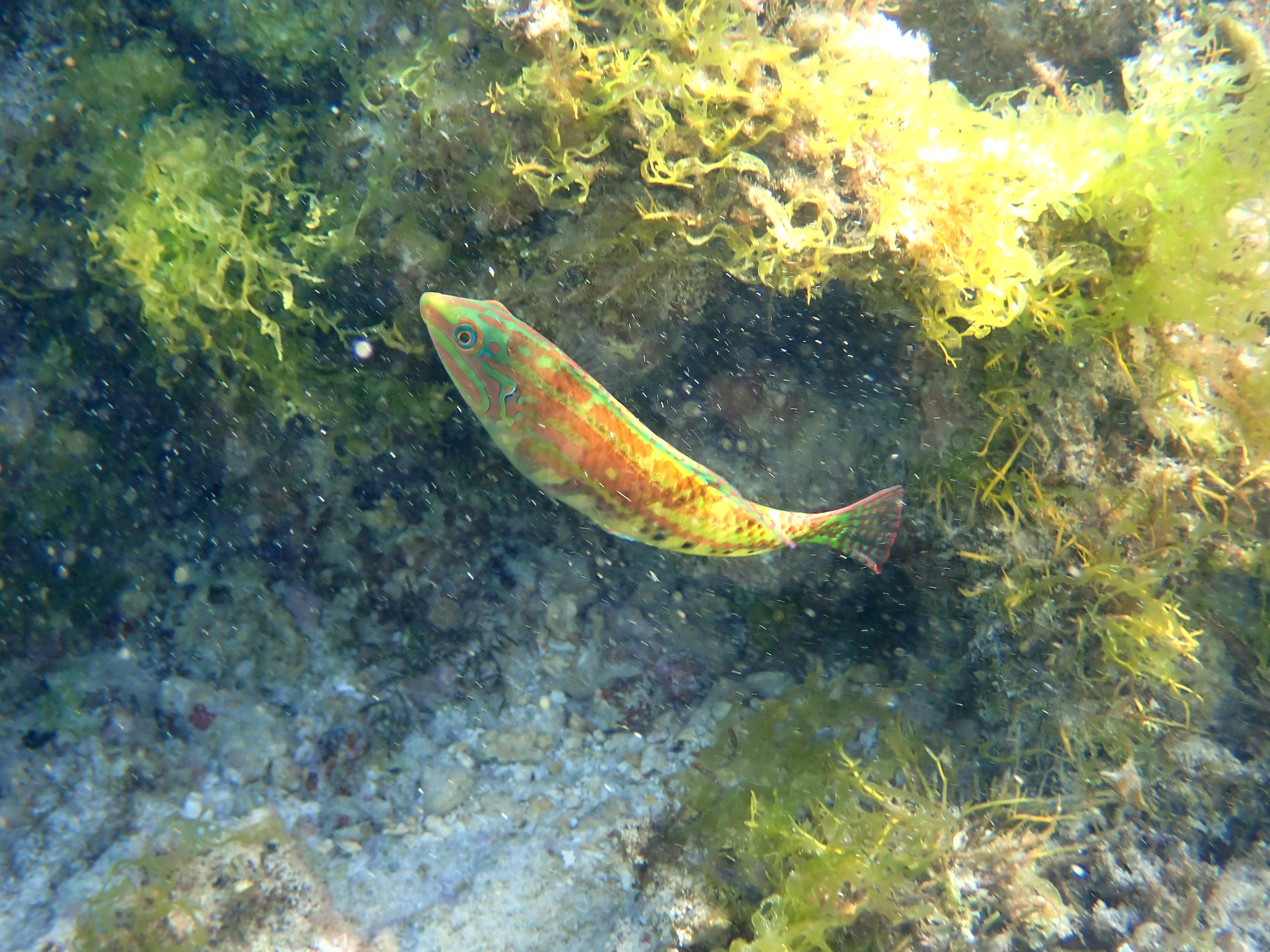

Scientific classification
- Kingdom: Animalia
- Phylum: Chordata
- Class: Actinopterygii
- Order: Labriformes
- Family: Labridae
- Genus: Halichoeres
- Species: H. zulu

Binomial name
- Halichoeres zulu J. E. Randall & D. R. King, 2010

= Halichoeres zulu =

Species of fish

Halichoeres zulu, the Kwa-Zulu Natal wrasse, is a species of ray-finned fish from the family Labridae, the wrasses. It is native to the south western Indian Ocean. It was first described in 2010.

== Description ==
Halichoeres zulu is characterized its naked head which has no small scales on the opercle or to the rear of the eye. In alcohol the colour of the female is pale tan with the scales on upper two-thirds of body, to the rear of the pectoral fins, have brown centres, while the scales below the soft part of the dorsal fin are dark brown, as are those in the lowermost scale row. There are three wide sooty bars on the chest and abdomen which fade towards the belly. The opercular flap has a black spot shaped like a quotation mark at upper end of gill slit and a dark brown spot of a similar size to the pupil is behind the upper part of the eye. The snout has an angled dark band with another over the cheek and the gill cover which is long and horseshoe-shaped band with dark edges. There are an oblique brown bands on the dorsal fin with a small black spot on between the first two spines and a black eye-spot between second and fourth dorsal fin rays. There are small dark spots on the rays of the rounded tail fin. The male shows a similar patterning, although most of the markings are darker than the females and there no black spot near the front of the dorsal fin and no oblique bands in spiny part of it. The male has a sinuous dark band at the base of anal fin with a wavy dusky band and a light spot at base of each membrane in that fin. Females are mainly pink or lavender-pink, in life, with narrow pale green bands and a bright red stripe on nape, this extends to the rear part of the dorsal fin. There is also a row of small, dark brown spots on the flanks above the anal fin. The males have deep pink and bright green bands on their heads and they have sinuous stripes of bright green and purplish red which alternate on their bodies. This species can reach 13.5 cm (5.3 in) in standard length.

== Distribution ==
Halichoeres zulu ranges from the northern Transkei to Banganek which is just south of the mouth of Kosi Bay in northern KwaZulu Natal. It is expected that it will also be found in southern Mozambique.

== Habitat and biology ==
Halichoeres zulu occurs solitarily at depths from 0 to 2 m (0.0 to 6.6 ft) along rocky shores, where there are patches of sand and coral. The shallow-water habitat off rocky shores in which this species is found are exposed to the wind and the waves, making it difficult to obtain specimens and this combined with its similarity to H. nebulosus, its rarity and elusive nature meant that it was previously overlooked.

== Taxonomy and naming ==
Halichoeres zulu was described in 2010 by John Ernest Randall & Dennis R. King with the type locality given as Umhlanga Rocks in KwaZulu-Natal, South Africa. The specific name refers to the Zulu people who are indigenous to KwaZulu-Natal. This rare species was formerly misidentified as Halichoeres nebulosus, and is a close relative of the Indo-Pacific Halichoeres margaritaceus.
