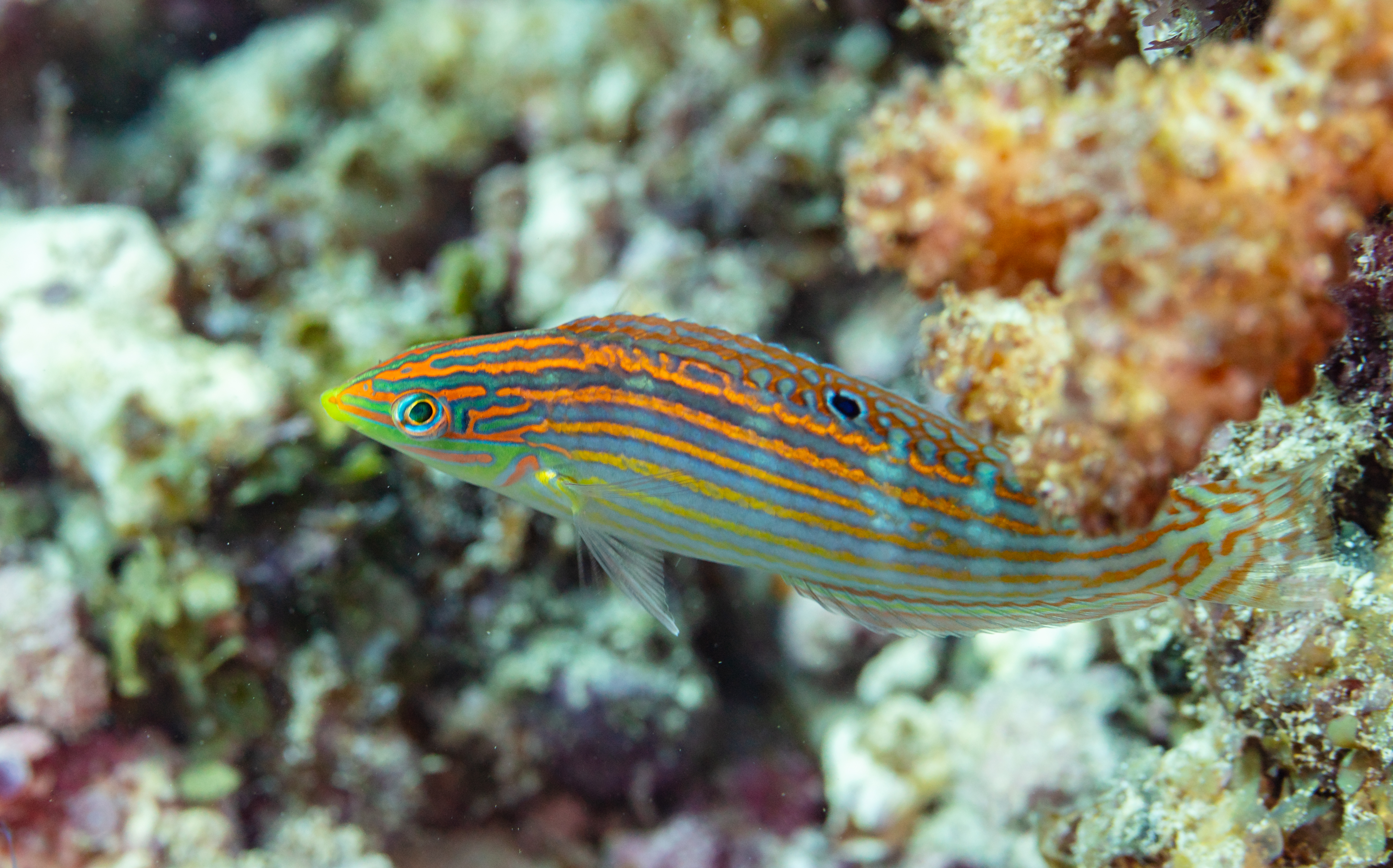

Conservation status
- Least Concern (IUCN 3.1)

Scientific classification
- Kingdom: Animalia
- Phylum: Chordata
- Class: Actinopterygii
- Order: Labriformes
- Family: Labridae
- Genus: Halichoeres
- Species: H. cosmetus

Binomial name
- Halichoeres cosmetus (Randall & M. M. Smith), 1982)

= Halichoeres cosmetus =

Species of fish

Halichoeres cosmetus, or the adorned wrasse, is a species of salt water wrasse the Indian Ocean from South Africa north to Yemen, including Socotra and east to western Thailand.
