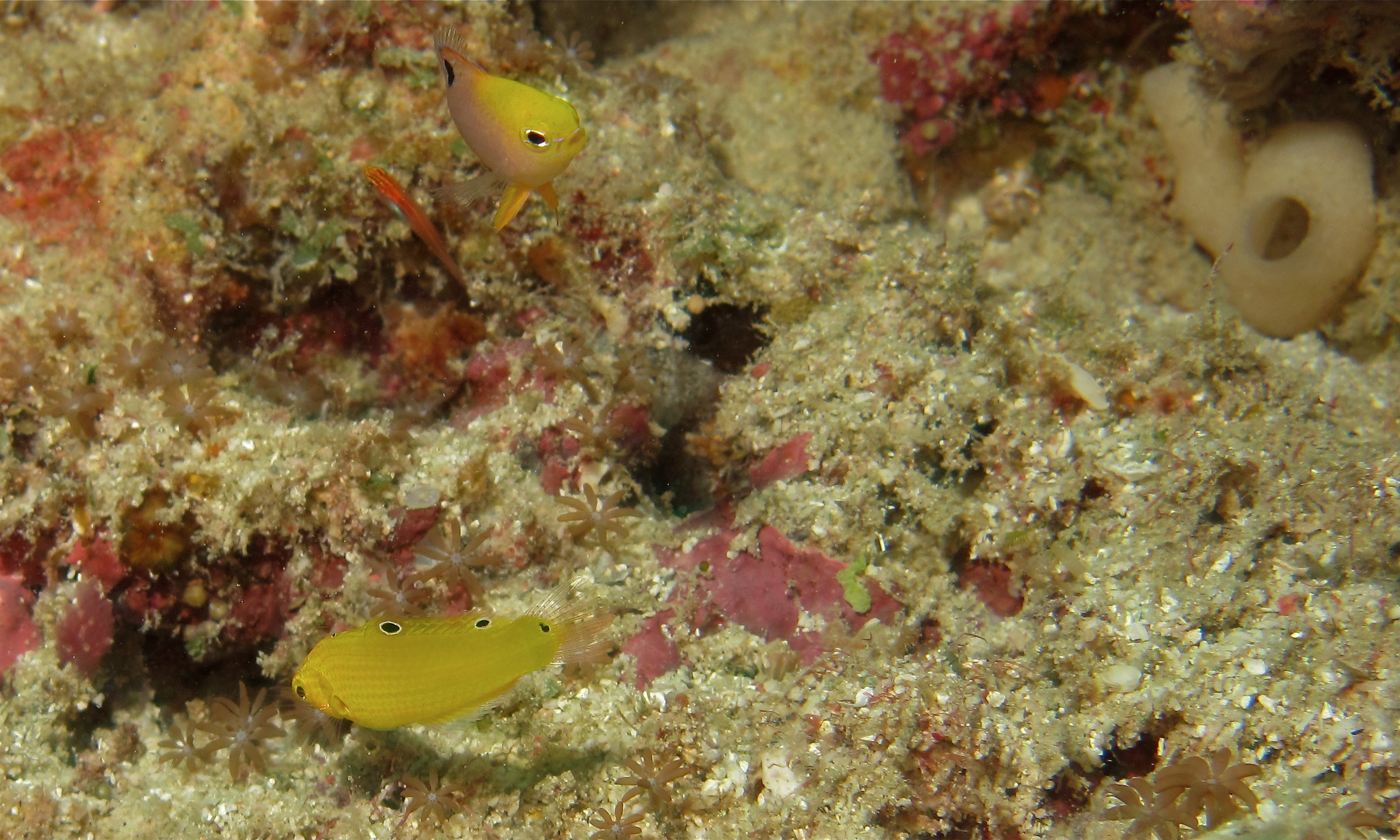
- Talbot's demoiselle (Chrysiptera talboti) (Top) and canarytop wrasse (Halichoeres leucoxanthus) (Bottom)

Conservation status
- Least Concern (IUCN 3.1)

Scientific classification
- Kingdom: Animalia
- Phylum: Chordata
- Class: Actinopterygii
- Division: Teleostei
- Order: Labriformes
- Family: Labridae
- Genus: Halichoeres
- Species: H. leucoxanthus

Binomial name
- Halichoeres leucoxanthus J. E. Randall & Smith, 1982

= Halichoeres leucoxanthus =

Species of fish

Halichoeres leucoxanthus, commonly called the canarytop wrasse, whitebelly wrasse, or lemon meringue wrasse, is a fish species in the wrasse family endemic to the Indian Ocean.

== Description ==
The canarytop wrasse is a small fish that can reach a maximum length of 12 cm (4.7 in).

It has a thin, elongate body with a terminal mouth. Body coloration is bright yellow and white with a few variations according to age.

During the juvenile phase, the young wrasse is completely bright yellow with two black ocellus on the dorsal fin and one on the caudal peduncle.

When reaching the initial phase, the body has two colors: white on belly and bright yellow on the back with the same ocellus, plus one more on the first spines of the dorsal fin.

At the terminal phase, only a few changes occur, such as the head becoming a mix of yellowish and greenish with pinkish lines and with age the ocellus tending to blur.

== Distribution and habitat ==
The canaritop wrasse is widespread throughout the tropical and subtropical waters of the Indian Ocean, from the Laccadive, Maledives, and Chagos archipelagos to the island of Java in Indonesia, including the Andaman Sea.

This wrasse occurs in rubble and sandy areas close to coral reefs, from depths of 10 to 50 meters (33 to 164 ft).

== Biology ==
The canaritop wrasse lives in small groups. It is a benthic predator that feeds mainly on small marine invertebrates, such as crustaceans, molluscs, worms, and echinoderms captured on or in the substrate.

Like most wrasse, the canari wrasse is a protogynous hermaphrodite, i.e. individuals start life as females with the capability of turning male later on.

== Conservation status ==
The species is targeted but not thought to be threatened by the aquarium trade.
