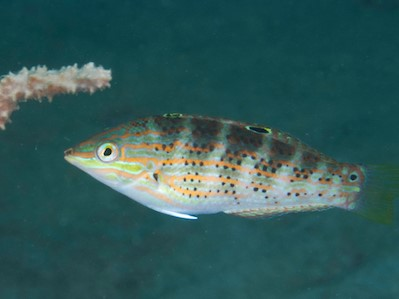

Conservation status
- Least Concern (IUCN 3.1)

Scientific classification
- Kingdom: Animalia
- Phylum: Chordata
- Class: Actinopterygii
- Order: Labriformes
- Family: Labridae
- Genus: Halichoeres
- Species: H. binotopsis

Binomial name
- Halichoeres binotopsis (Bleeker, 1849)

Synonyms
- Julis binotopsis Bleeker, 1849

= Halichoeres binotopsis =

Species of fish

Halichoeres binotopsis, or the Saowisata wrasse, is a species of salt water wrasse found in the western Pacific Ocean from Singapore to western New Guinea, Indonesia and Papua New Guinea.

== Description ==
This species reaches a length of 8.9 cm (3.5 in).
