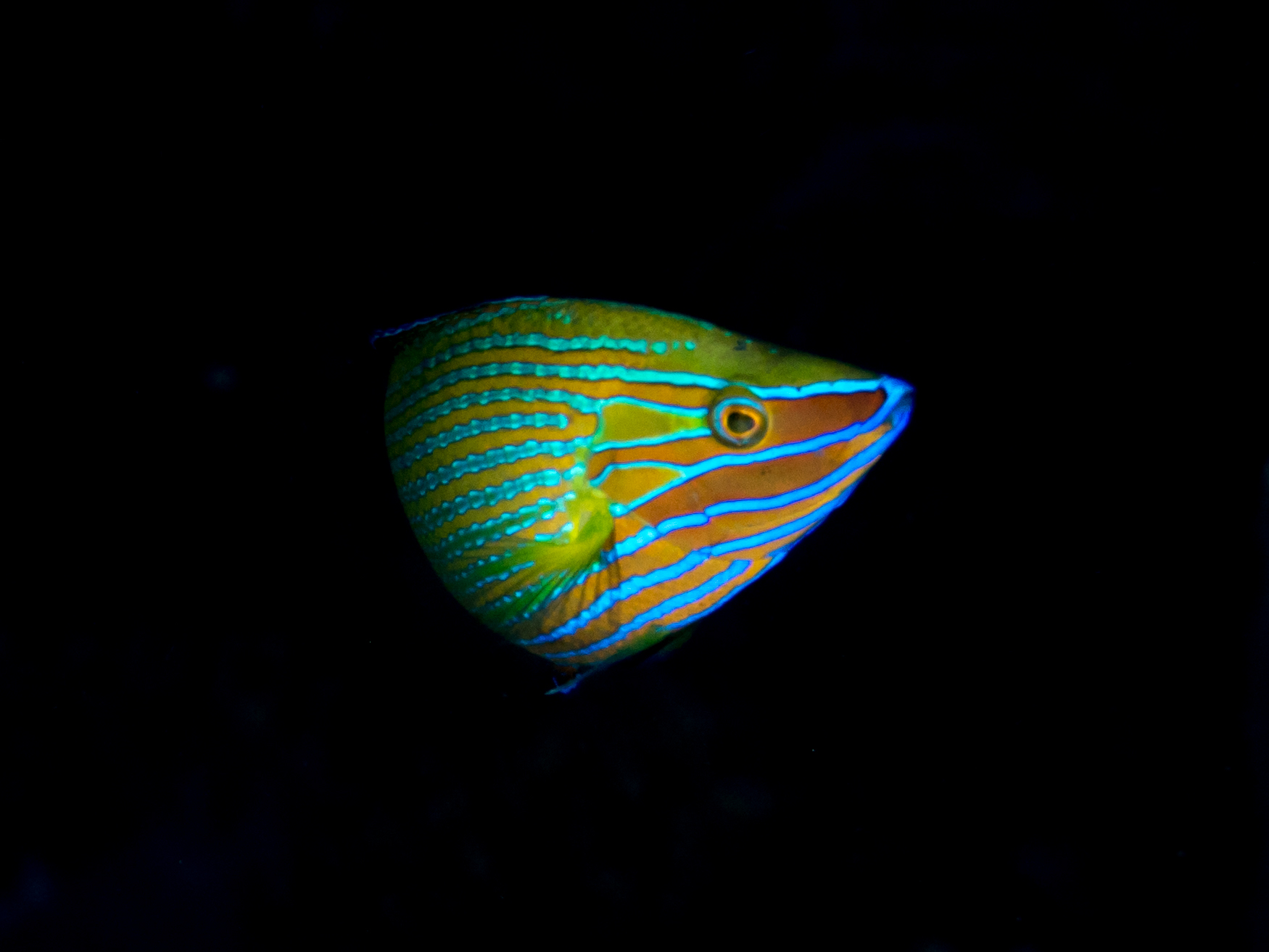

Conservation status
- Least Concern (IUCN 3.1)

Scientific classification
- Kingdom: Animalia
- Phylum: Chordata
- Class: Actinopterygii
- Order: Labriformes
- Family: Labridae
- Genus: Halichoeres
- Species: H. richmondi

Binomial name
- Halichoeres richmondi Fowler & B.A. Bean, 1928

= Halichoeres richmondi =

Species of fish

Halichoeres richmondi, commonly called the Richmond's wrasse or chain-lined wrasse, is a fish species in the wrasse family native from the central Indo-Pacific.

== Description ==
The Richmond's wrasse is a small fish that can reach a maximum length of 19 cm.

It has a thin, elongate body with a terminal mouth and a more pointed snout than other wrasse belonging to genus Halichoeres.

Body coloration has few variations according to age.

The juvenile has a light blue-green background color with many orange stripes. It has also two black ocellus: the first one on top part of its caudal peduncle and the second one in the middle of its dorsal fin. A black spot occurs on the first rays of the dorsal fin. Juveniles and females have in common an orange anal fin.

Mature male are quite different. Their body is greenish with many fin blue lines that are chain-like. A concave head profile with a green-brown color. The external border of their dorsal, caudal and anal fins are blue.

== Distribution & habitat ==
The chain-lined wrasse is widespread throughout the tropical and subtropical waters of the central Indo-Pacific, from Indonesia to Philippines and from Solomon Islands to south Japan.

This wrasse occurs in shallow waters from lagoons and channels rich in soft coral down to a depth of 12 meters.

== Biology ==
The chain-lined wrasse lives and feeds in small loose groups. It is a benthic predator that feeds mainly on small marine invertebrates such as crustaceans, molluscs, worms and echinoderms captured on or in the substrate. Like most wrasse, the chain-lined wrasse is a protogynous hermaphrodite, i.e. individuals start life as females with the capability of turning male later on.

== Conservation status ==
The species is targeted but not thought to be threatened by the aquarium trade. It is listed as Least Concern (LC) on the IUCN.

== Species description and etymology ==
Halichoeres richmondi was described in 1928 by the American ichthyologists Henry Weed Fowler and Barton Appler Bean with the type locality given as Inamucan Bay on Mindanao in the Philippines. The specific name honours the ornithologist Charles Wallace Richmond (1868-1932) of the United States National Museum.
