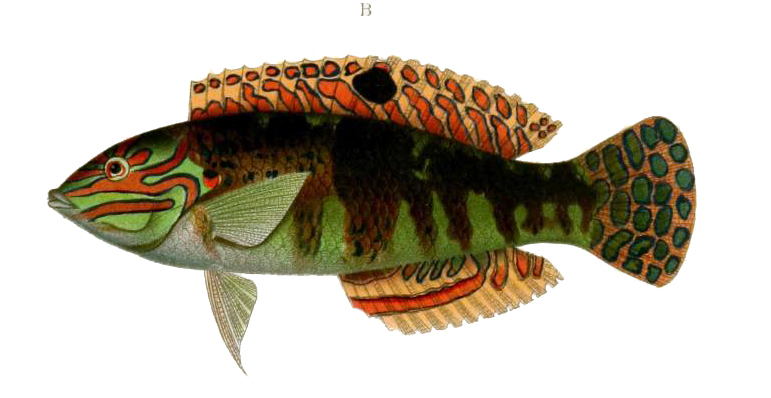

Conservation status
- Least Concern (IUCN 3.1)

Scientific classification
- Kingdom: Animalia
- Phylum: Chordata
- Class: Actinopterygii
- Order: Labriformes
- Family: Labridae
- Genus: Halichoeres
- Species: H. timorensis

Binomial name
- Halichoeres timorensis (Bleeker, 1852)

Synonyms
- Julis timorensis Bleeker, 1852; Julis kawarin Bleeker, 1852; Halichoeres kawarin (Bleeker, 1852); Halichoeris kawarin (Bleeker, 1852)

= Halichoeres timorensis =

Species of fish

Halichoeres timorensis, the Timor wrasse, is a species of salt water wrasse found in the Indo-West Pacific Ocean.

== Description ==
This species reaches a length of 12.0 cm (4.7 in).
