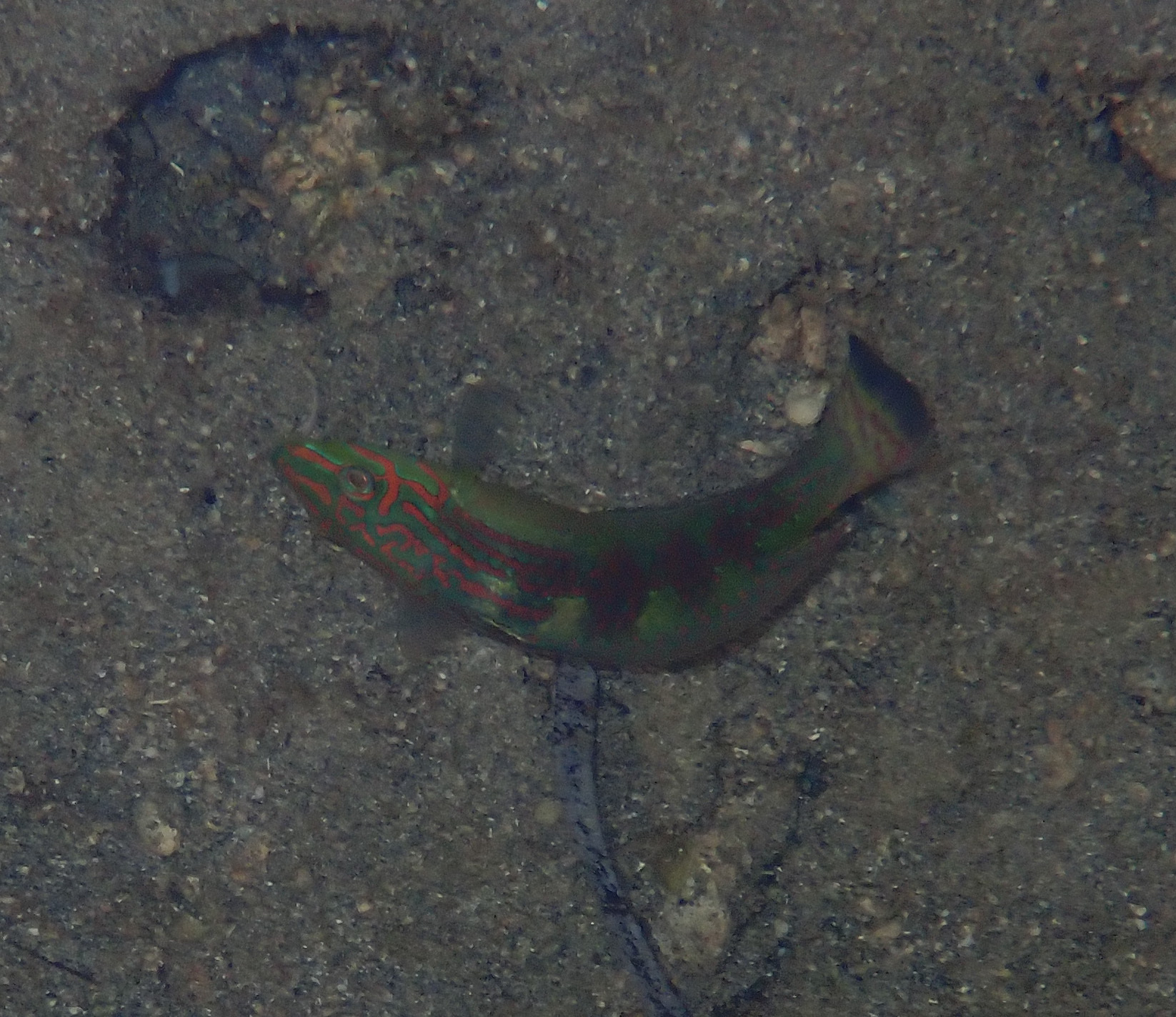

Conservation status
- Least Concern (IUCN 3.1)

Scientific classification
- Kingdom: Animalia
- Phylum: Chordata
- Class: Actinopterygii
- Order: Labriformes
- Family: Labridae
- Genus: Halichoeres
- Species: H. papilionaceus

Binomial name
- Halichoeres papilionaceus (Valenciennes, 1839)

Synonyms
- Julis papilionaceus Valenciennes, 1839; Julis schwarzii Bleeker, 1847; Julis dieschismenacanthoides Bleeker, 1853; Platyglossus doleschalli Steindachner, 1863

= Weed wrasse =

Species of fish

The Weed wrasse (Halichoeres papilionaceus), also known as Schwatz's wrasse or the seagrass wrasse, is a species of wrasse native to the Pacific Ocean from Sumatra to Solomon Islands. It can be found in groups at depths from 1 to 4 m (3.3 to 13.1 ft) in seagrass beds and coral reefs. This species can reach 12 cm (4.7 in) in total length. Body is oval, rather elongated and laterally compressed. Adults are green and pinkish.

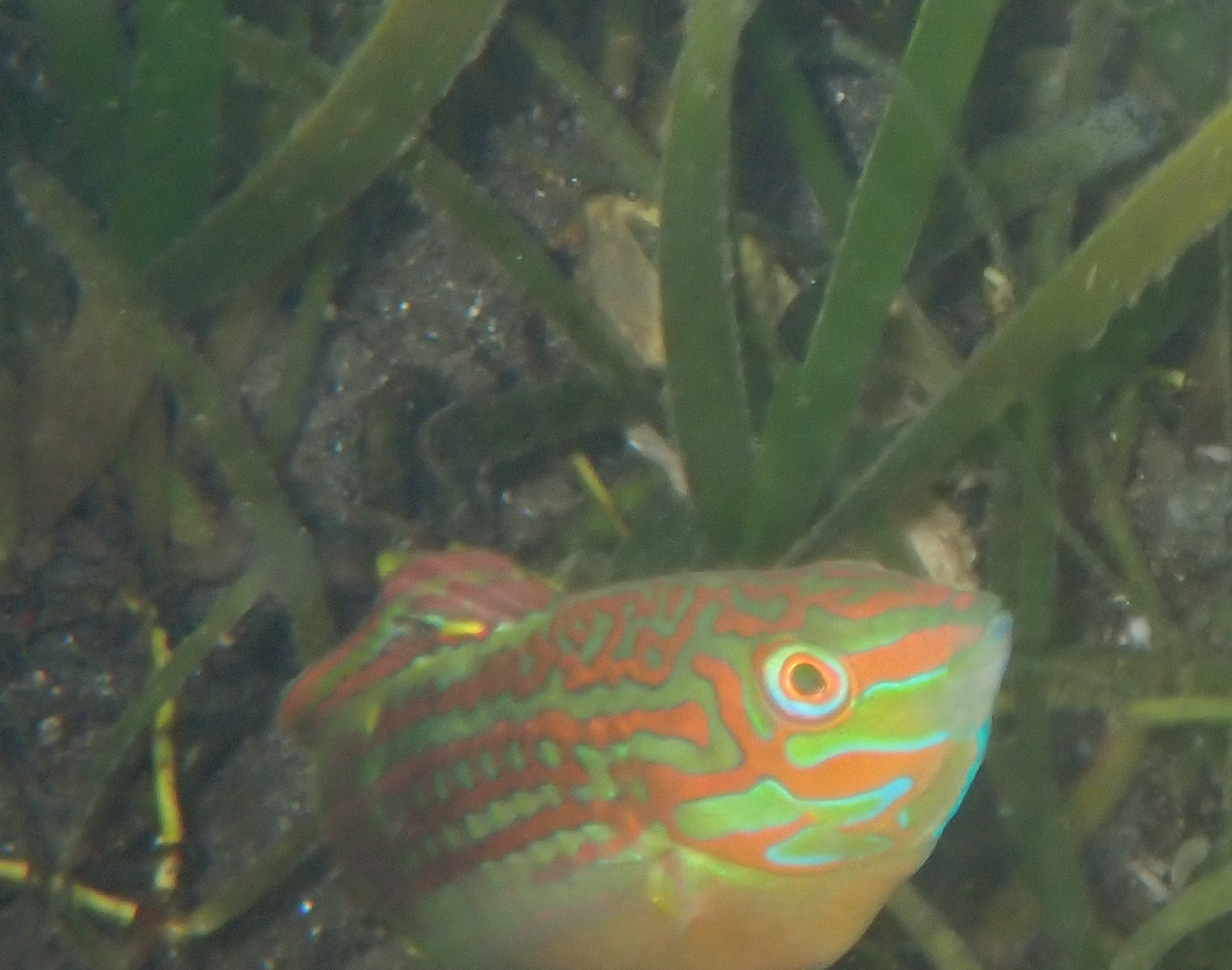
Seen in the Philippines
