= Halichoeres bicolor =

Conservation status
- Least Concern (IUCN 3.1)

Scientific classification
- Kingdom: Animalia
- Phylum: Chordata
- Class: Actinopterygii
- Order: Labriformes
- Family: Labridae
- Genus: Halichoeres
- Species: H. bicolor

Binomial name
- Halichoeres bicolor Bloch & J. G. Schneider, 1801

Synonyms
- Labrus bicolor Bloch & Schneider, 1801; Halichoeres bicolour (Bloch & Schneider, 1801); Julis hyrtlii Bleeker, 1856; Halichoeres hyrtli (Bleeker, 1856); Halichoeres hyrtlii (Bleeker, 1856)

Species of fish

Halichoeres bicolor, or the pearly-spotted wrasse, is a species of salt water wrasse found in the Indo-West Pacific Ocean from Sri Lanka to the Indo-Malayan region.

== Description ==
This species reaches a length of 12.0 cm (4.7 in).
