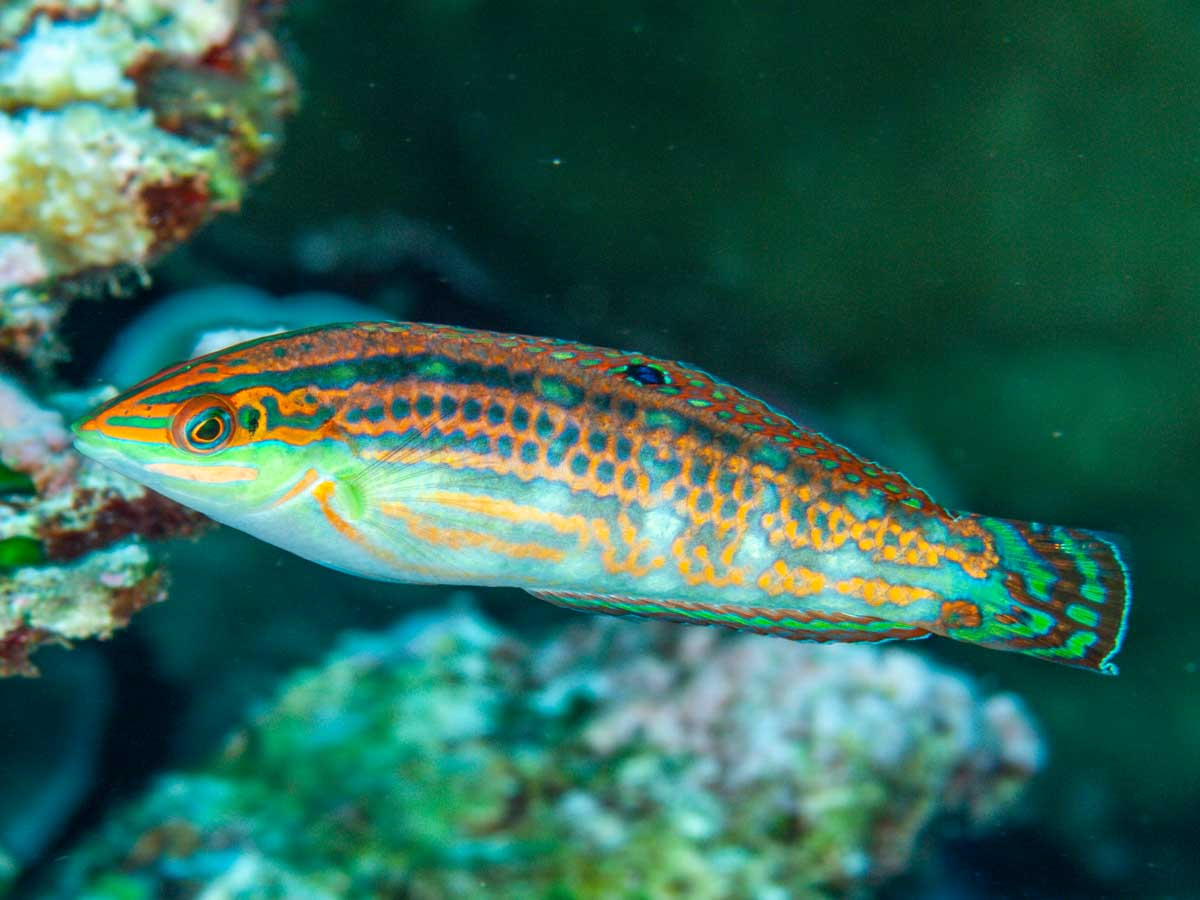

Conservation status
- Least Concern (IUCN 3.1)

Scientific classification
- Kingdom: Animalia
- Phylum: Chordata
- Class: Actinopterygii
- Order: Labriformes
- Family: Labridae
- Genus: Halichoeres
- Species: H. claudia

Binomial name
- Halichoeres claudia Randall & L. A. Rocha, 2009

= Halichoeres claudia =

Species of fish

Halichoeres claudia, the Christmas wrasse, is a species of wrasse of the family Labridae. It is widely distributed in the southwestern Pacific, occurring from French Polynesia to the Great Barrier Reef, with isolated populations in the Indian Ocean (Christmas Island and Cocos Keeling). This species was treated as Halichoeres ornatissimus for a long time, however, genetic evidence has shown that H. ornatissimus is restricted to Hawaii, while H. claudia is widespread in the western Pacific. The species was named in honor of Claudia Rocha for her contributions to ichthyology.
