= Spanish flag (disambiguation) =

Spanish flag is the national flag of Spain.

Spanish flag may also refer to various species:

- Gonioplectrus hispanus, a species of grouper (fish)
- Ipomoea lobata (plant)
- Lantana camara (plant)
- Euplagia quadripunctaria (moth)
