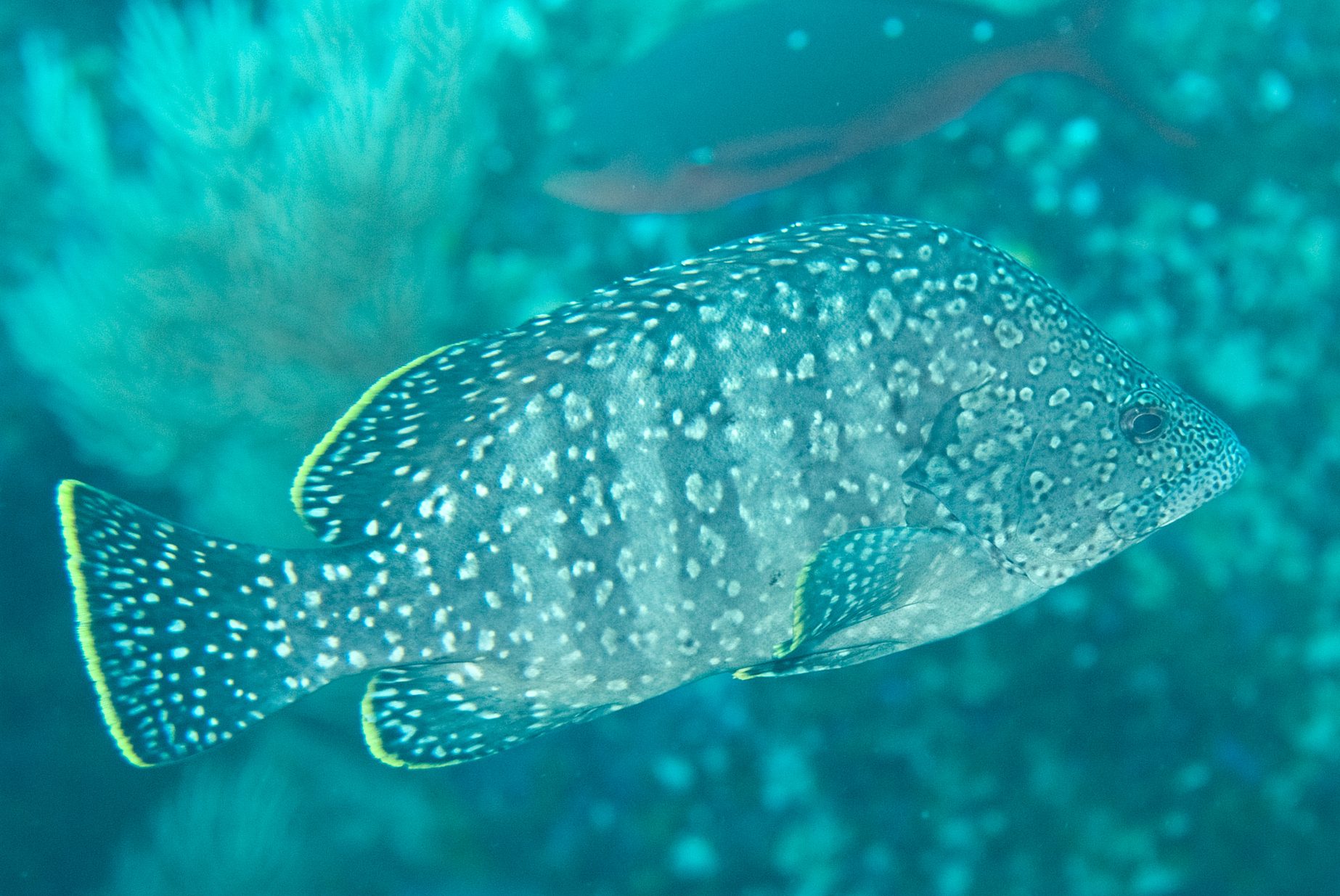
- In the Galapagos

Conservation status
- Least Concern (IUCN 3.1)

Scientific classification
- Kingdom: Animalia
- Phylum: Chordata
- Class: Actinopterygii
- Division: Teleostei
- Order: Perciformes
- Family: Epinephelidae
- Genus: Dermatolepis
- Species: D. dermatolepis

Binomial name
- Dermatolepis dermatolepis (Boulenger, 1895)

Synonyms
- Epinephelus dermatolepis Boulenger, 1895; Dermatolepis punctatus Gill, 1861

= Dermatolepis dermatolepis =

Species of fish

Dermatolepis dermatolepis, the leather bass is a species of marine ray-finned fish, a grouper of the family Epinephelidae. It is a predatory reef fish which is found in the eastern Pacific Ocean.

== Taxonomy ==
Dermatolepis dermatolepis was originally described as Dermatolepis punctatus by the American ichthyologist Theodore Nicholas Gill (1837-1914) as the type species of the monotypic subgenus Dermatolepis of the genus Epinephelus with the type locality given as Cape San Lucas, Baja California in Mexico. This name was preoccupied by Holocentrus punctatus, a possible synonym of Epinephelus guttatus.

== Distribution ==
Dermatolepis dermatolepis occurs in the eastern Pacific Ocean along the western coast of North and South America from southern California to Peru. They are also found on the Galapagos Islands, the Revillagigedo Islands, Cocos Island and Clipperton Island.

== Description ==
In Panama

Dermatolepis dermatolepis has a maximum recorded total length of 100 centimetres (39 in), and they have been weighted up to 12.5 kilograms (28 lb). The body is at least twice as deep as its standard length, is at its deepest at the origin of the dorsal fin, and is laterally compressed. The dorsal profile of head is steep and the eye has a diameter which is less than the length of the snout. The caudal fin is rounded and the pectoral fins are short. The dorsal fin contains 11 spines and 18-20 soft rays while the anal fin has 3 spines and 9 soft rays.

The adults have a greyish-brown body with alternating dark grey to blackish and white to pale grey bars mottled by many white to pale blotches. The margins of the fins have thin bands of yellow. The juveniles are black with narrow white stripes on the head and the body which extend onto the dorsal and anal fins with a white caudal fin which has black spots.

== Habitat and biology ==
Juvenile between the spines of an urchin

Dermatolepis dermatolepis is a species of coral and rocky reefs down to at least 50 metres (160 ft) and is likely to be found at much greater depths. The small juveniles may use the long spines of the sea urchins Centrostephanus and Diadema for shelter.

=== Diet ===
Juvenile, in Panama

It is a diurnal predator which preys on small benthic fishes and sometimes on crustaceans. It will associate with browsing herbivorous fishes, hiding amongst them and feeding on the hidden animals disturbed by these fish as they browse. They have also been recorded following moray eels as they forage, preying on fishes fleeing from the eel.

=== Reproduction ===
This species forms schools and synchronized spawning aggregations made up of around 30 to 70 fishes. Spawning aggregations have been observed from late November until February over a seamount off Cocos Island. They have also been observed spawning at Manuelita Island close to Cocos Island in late July. In the Revillagigedo Islands of Mexico spawning aggregations of 30-54 individuals have been recorded in February over a shallow seamount.

== Gallery ==
In Panama

In the Galapagos, with a school of razor surgeonfish
