= Marbled grouper =

- In Brazil

Conservation status
- Data Deficient (IUCN 3.1)

Scientific classification
- Kingdom: Animalia
- Phylum: Chordata
- Class: Actinopterygii
- Division: Teleostei
- Order: Perciformes
- Family: Epinephelidae
- Genus: Dermatolepis
- Species: D. inermis

Binomial name
- Dermatolepis inermis (Valenciennes, 1833)

Synonyms
- List: Serranus inermis Valenciennes, 1833; Epinephelus inermis (Valenciennes, 1833); Dermatolepis zanclus Evermann & Kendall, 1898; Dermatolepis marmoratus Osburn & Mowbray, 1915

Species of fish

The marbled grouper (Dermatolepis inermis), donkey fish, mutton hamlet, rockhind and sicklefish grouper, is a species of marine ray-finned fish, a grouper from the subfamily Epinephelinae which is part of the family Serranidae, which also includes the anthias and sea basses. It is a predatory reef fish which is found in the Western Atlantic Ocean.

== Taxonomy ==
The marbled grouper was first formally described as Serranus inermis in 1833 by the Frenchzoologist Achille Valenciennes (1794–1865) with the type locality given as the Antilles.

== Distribution ==
The marbled grouper is found in the Western Atlantic Ocean from North Carolina south along the eastern coast of the United States to the Bahamas, in the Gulf of Mexico it is distributed from northwestern Cuba north to Alabama and the Flower Garden Banks, having also been recorded over salt domes in the United States territorial waters of the northern Gulf. In the Caribbean Sea it occurs from Cuba to Tobago, as well as Guanaja Island in Honduras. Off the coast of South America it is found from Santa Marta in Colombia to Guyana and then off Brazil from São Luís to São Paulo, including the Trindade and Fernando de Noronha Islands, Rocas Atoll, Parcel de Manuel Luís Marine State Park and Abrolhos Bank.

== Description ==
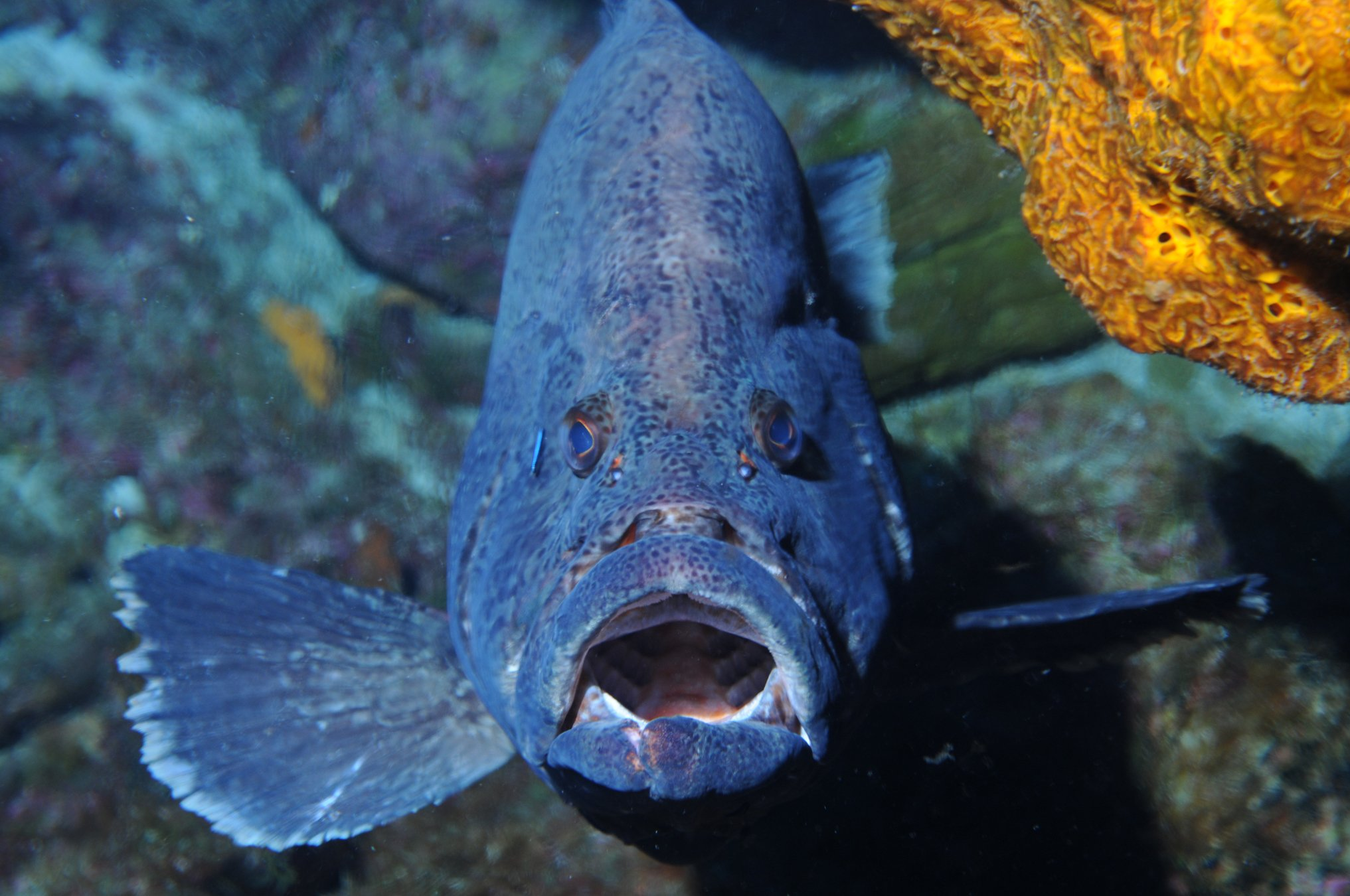
Front view, in the Gulf of Mexico

The marbled grouper attains a maximum recorded total length of 91 centimetres (36 in) and a maximum weight of 10 kilograms (22 lb), although 50 centimetres (20 in) is a more common length. It has a body which is at least twice as deep as its standard length which is at its deepest at the origin of the dorsal fin and laterally compressed. It has a long snout and the dorsal profile of the head is steep. The dorsal fin has 11 spines and 18-20 soft rays while the anal fin has 3 spines and 8-9 soft rays, the pectoral fin is large.

The adults are yellowish brown marked with numerous small dark brown spots on the head, body and fins and pale blotches on the head and body. The juveniles are dark brown through to black, marked with an irregular scattering of white blotches on the head and body.

== Habitat and biology ==
The marbled grouper normally occurs on deep ledges, at depths between 3 and 250 metres (9.8 and 820.2 ft) as well as on reefs, where it is usually found in caves or deep crevices. It is a solitary species which is secretive, nervously darting off when it is approached or threatened. Its biology is little known but it is assumed that it forms aggregations for spawning like other groupers. The juveniles have been observed hiding among the spines of sea urchins.

== Utilisation and conservation ==
The marbled grouper has been described as being of little interest to fisheries but its flesh is esteemed in Brazil and it is sometimes taken by both anglers and commercial fisheries. Exploitation of spawning aggregations may me a threat to some populations. The IUCN classify it as Data Deficient due to a lack of information on its population. The population of this naturally rare and sparsely distributed species is, however, suspected to be decreasing.
