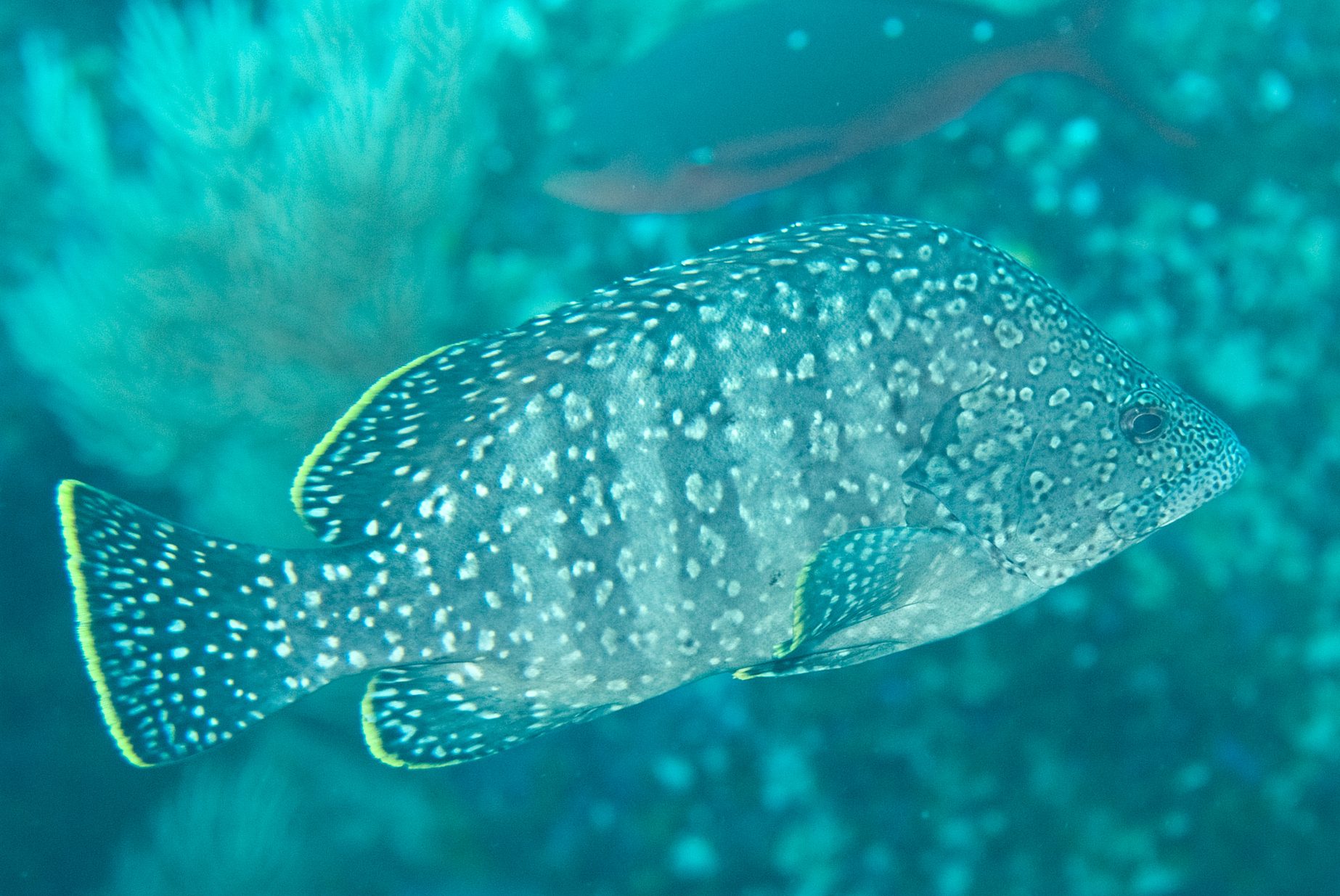
- Dermatolepis dermatolepis

Scientific classification
- Kingdom: Animalia
- Phylum: Chordata
- Class: Actinopterygii
- Division: Teleostei
- Order: Perciformes
- Family: Epinephelidae
- Genus: Dermatolepis; Gill, 1861

Type species
- Dermatolepis punctatus Gill, 1861

Synonyms
- Lioperca Gill, 1862

= Dermatolepis =

Genus of fishes

Dermatolepis is a genus of marine ray-finned fish, groupers from the subfamily Epinephelinae, part of the family Serranidae, which also includes the anthias and sea basses. They are found in the western Atlantic, Pacific and Indian Oceans.

Dermatolepis is sister to the genus Alphestes.

== Species ==
The genus Dermatolepis contains these species:

Image	Species	Common name
	Dermatolepis dermatolepis (Boulenger, 1895)	Leather bass
	Dermatolepis inermis (Valenciennes, 1833)	Marbled grouper
	Dermatolepis striolata (Playfair, 1867)	Smooth grouper
