= Smooth grouper =

- In Kenya

Conservation status
- Least Concern (IUCN 3.1)

Scientific classification
- Kingdom: Animalia
- Phylum: Chordata
- Class: Actinopterygii
- Division: Teleostei
- Order: Perciformes
- Family: Epinephelidae
- Genus: Dermatolepis
- Species: D. striolata

Binomial name
- Dermatolepis striolata (Playfair, 1867)

Synonyms
- Serranus striolatus Playfair, 1867; Serranus gibbosus Boulenger, 1888; Dermatolepis aldabrensis J. L. B. Smith, 1955

Species of fish

The smooth grouper (Dermatolepis striolata) is a species of marine ray-finned fish, a grouper of the family Epinephelidae. It is associated with reefs and is found in the western Indian Ocean.

== Taxonomy ==
The smooth grouper was first formally described as Serranus striolatus in 1867 by the Scottish soldier, diplomat, naturalist and author Lambert Playfair (1828-1899) with the type locality given as Zanzibar.

== Distribution ==
The smooth grouper is found in the western Indian Ocean. Along the African coast its distribution extends from Somalia to Durban in South Africa. It is also found around the Comoros Islands, Madagascar and Aldabra in the Seychelles. It is also found around the southern Arabian Peninsula as far east as the Iranian waters of the Gulf of Oman.It has also been reported from the Red Sea.

== Description ==
In Mozambique

The smooth grouper has been recorded growing up to a total length of 85 centimetres (33 in), and the maximum published weight is 10.5 kilograms (23 lb). It has a body which is at 2.4-2.6 times as deep as its standard length The eye has a diameter which is markedly shorter than the length of the snout. The preopercle is serrated with the serrations covered by skin. The spines on the gill cover are not easy to see. The dorsal profile of the head is slightly concave or straight. The caudal fin is rounded or truncate with rounded corners. It has smooth scales which are largely covered by skin and auxiliary scales. There are 11 spines and 18-19 soft rays in the dorsal fin while the anal fin has 3 spines and 9-10 soft rays.

In Kenya

The colour of this fish is overall yellowish to reddish brown, becoming paler ventrally. The adults have small, round, dark spots covering the head, body and fins. The juveniles have many small dark brown spots on the head, body and fins, the spots on the body are elongated horizontally while those on the fins are less obvious. The dorsal, anal and caudal fin also have pale spots and there are also pale, irregular blotches of various sizes which vary on visibility too.

== Habitat and biology ==
The smooth grouper is a rare species found on the shallow waters of sheltered, turbid coastal rocky or coral reefs. They have been reported to shoal in small in small groups of up to 8 fishes. Analysis of stomach contents show that they are piscivorus. It is not known whether they form aggregations for spawning.
