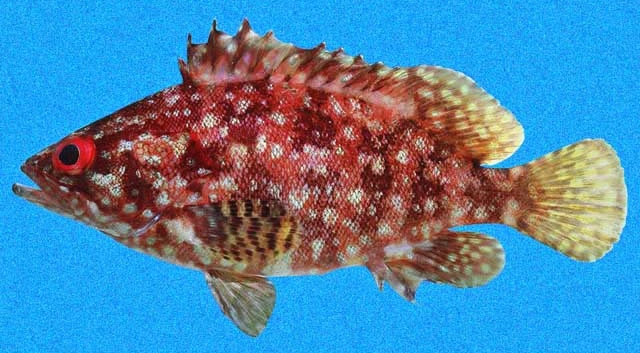

Conservation status
- Least Concern (IUCN 3.1)

Scientific classification
- Kingdom: Animalia
- Phylum: Chordata
- Class: Actinopterygii
- Order: Perciformes
- Family: Epinephelidae
- Genus: Alphestes
- Species: A. immaculatus

Binomial name
- Alphestes immaculatus Breder, 1936
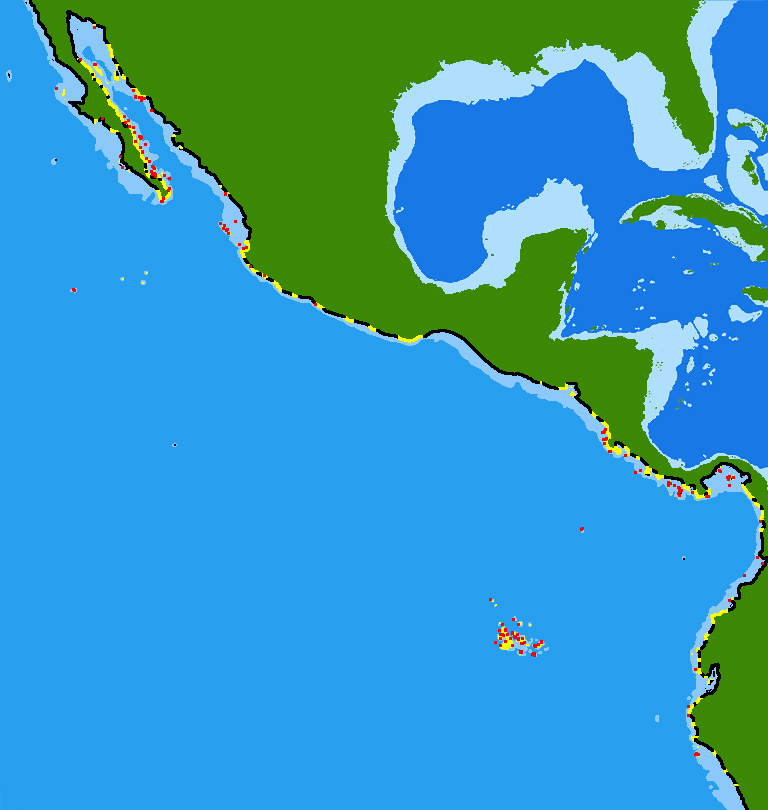

Synonyms
- Alphestes galapagensis Fowler, 1944; Alphestes fasciatus Hildebrand, 1946

= Alphestes immaculatus =

Species of fish

Alphestes immaculatus, the Pacific mutton hamlet, is a species of marine ray-finned fish which is classified within the subfamily Epinephelinae, the groupers, in the family Serranidae which also includes the anthias and sea basses. It is a predatory fish of the rocky coastlines of the eastern Pacific Ocean.

== Description ==
Alphestes immaculatus has a strongly compressed, deep body with large eyes and a short snout and a straight forehead. The dorsal fin has 11 spines and 17-19 soft rays while the anal fin has 3 spines and 9 soft rays. It has a rounded preopercle with an obviously serrated rear edge and a large spine, which is usually covered with skin, projecting downward and forward at its angle. The head and body are marbled reddish brown in colour, with obscure bars and small dark and pale spots all over the head, body and dorsal, anal and caudal fins. The pectoral fins have 7 or 8 irregular horizontal series of small dark spots running across them. The maximum recorded total length is 30 centimetres (12 in) but they are more normally around 18 centimetres (7.1 in).

== Distribution ==
Alphestes immaculatusis found in the Eastern Pacific Ocean from southern Baja California and the Gulf of California south as far as Peru. It is also found around the Islas Marías and Revillagigedos of Mexico, the Galápagos, Malpelo Island in Colombia and Cocos Island in Costa Rica.

== Habitat and biology ==
Alphestes immaculatus is a secretive, camouflaged species of shallow water found in sea grass beds and rocky reefs at depths between 1 and 50 metres (3 ft 3 in and 164 ft 1 in). During the day it stays hidden in crevices or lying among seaweed, relying on their cryptic colouration to escape detection by predators. Occasionally, a fish will partially bury itself in sand. They become mobile at night, searching for their main prey of benthic invertebrates and small fishes. It is normally a solitary species but has been seen in small groups of up to 6 individuals. They can live for up to nine years. Muscle hepcidin expression could be significant in the immune response in fish. The expression of HAMP1 gene of A. immaculatus in muscle at basal conditions could describe a mechanism of protection upon the invasion of pathogens before a strong stimulus.

== Taxonomy ==
Alphestes immaculatus was first formally described in 1936 by the American ichthyologist Charles M. Breder Jr. (1897-1983). It has been confused with the closely related and somewhat similar mutton hamlet Alphestes afer of the western Atlantic.

== Utilisation ==
Alphestes immaculatus is not a target of commercial fisheries although some artisanal fisheries do catch it using lines or gill nets. In Mexico the value of this species at market has increased as larger grouper species stocks dwindle through overfishing.
