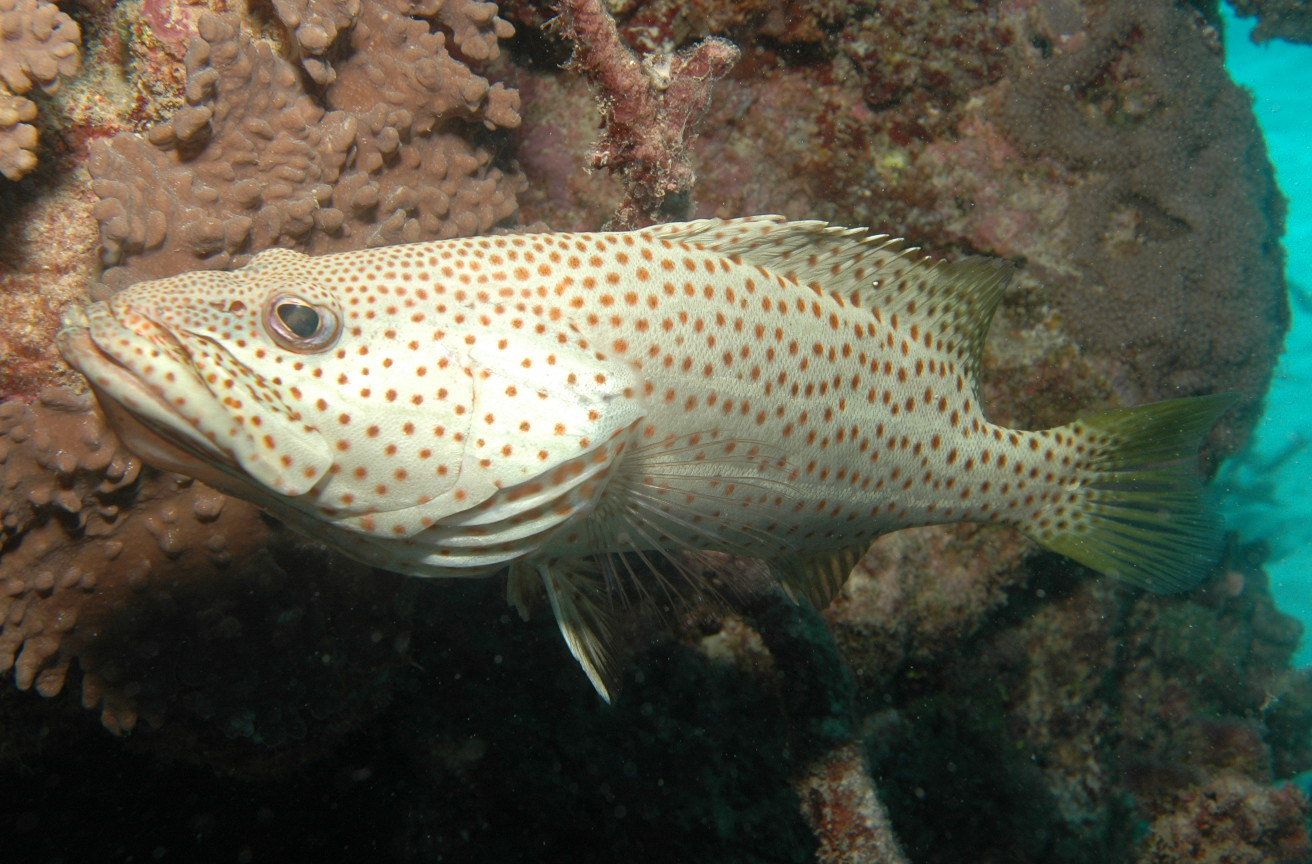

Conservation status
- Least Concern (IUCN 3.1)

Scientific classification
- Kingdom: Animalia
- Phylum: Chordata
- Class: Actinopterygii
- Division: Teleostei
- Order: Perciformes
- Suborder: Percoidei
- Family: Epinephelidae
- Genus: Anyperodon; Günther, 1859
- Species: A. leucogrammicus

Binomial name
- Anyperodon leucogrammicus (Valenciennes, 1828)

Synonyms
- Serranus leucogrammicus Valenciennes, 1828; Serranus micronotatus Rüppell, 1838; Serranus urophthalmus Bleeker, 1855

= Slender grouper =

Genus of fish

The slender grouper (Anyperodon leucogrammicus) is a species of marine ray-finned fish in the grouper family Epinephelidae. It is the only species in the genus Anyperodon.

== Taxonomy ==
In 2014, molecular analyses based on five genes found that Anyperodon leucogrammicus is included in the same clade as species of Epinephelus. Consequently, the species should be renamed as Epinephelus leucogrammicus.

== Distribution and habitat ==
The slender grouper has a wide distribution in the tropical Indian and Pacific Oceans: the range extends from the east coast of Africa and the Red Sea at 32°E to southern Japan and Australia at 171°W. It is found on coral reefs and seaward reef slopes and in lagoons at a depth of usually no more than 50 m (160 ft), although it may sometimes venture to a depth of 80 m (260 ft).

== Description ==
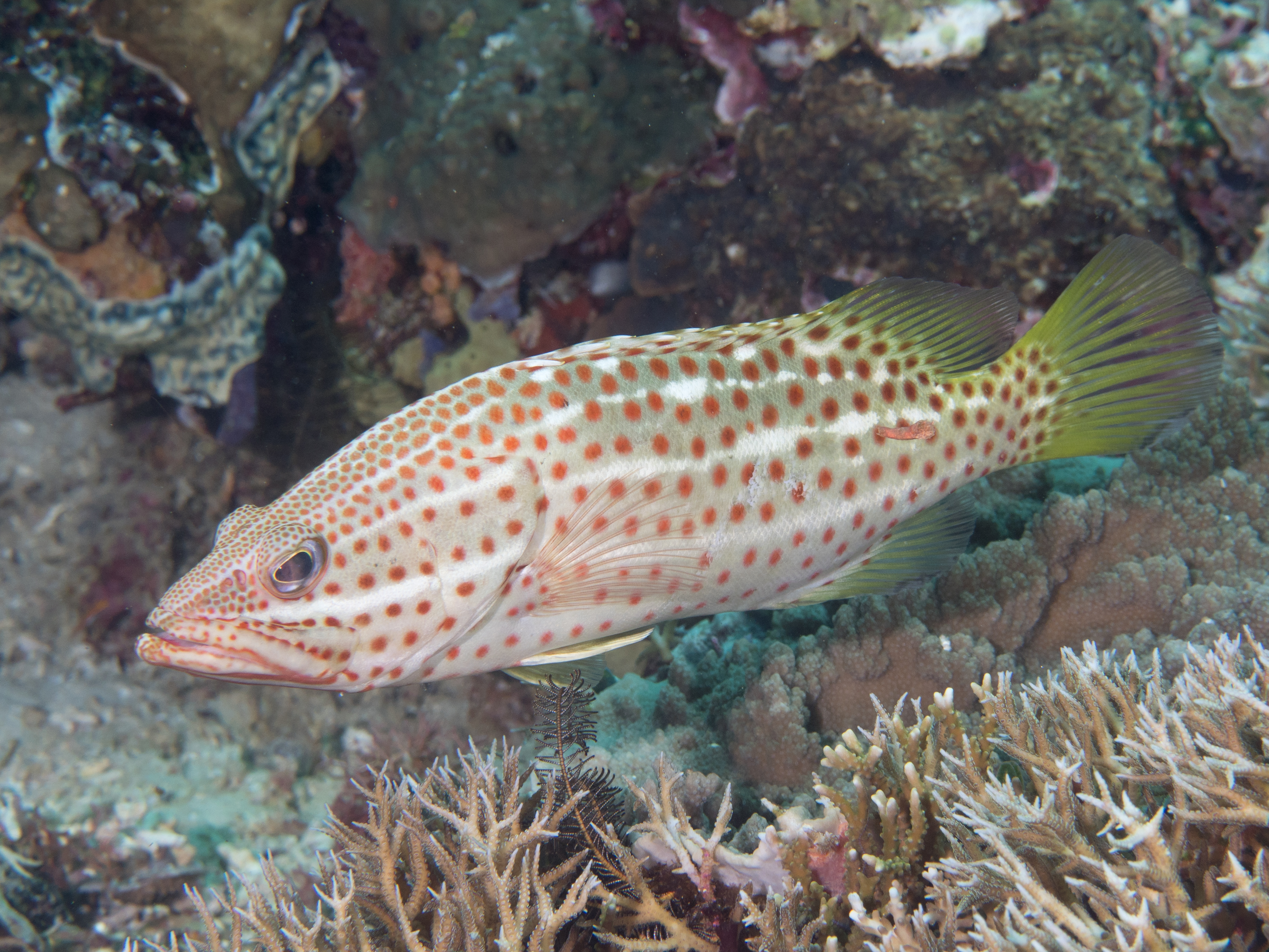
In Indonesia

The slender grouper is a medium-sized fish growing to a length of about 65 cm (26 in). The head occupies 40% of the total length and the mouth is large, with the lower jaw longer than the upper jaw. There are no palatine teeth, a fact which distinguishes this species from other groupers. The head and body of adults are pale reddish-brown and liberally dotted with orange spots which are closer together on the head. There are five pale silvery-blue longitudinal stripes running along the flanks, the lower three reaching the caudal fin but the upper two breaking into irregular streaks as they reach the posterior part of the body. In contrast, juvenile fish have vivid blue and red longitudinal stripes. The dorsal fin of slender groupers has 11 spines and 14-16 soft rays, while the anal fin has 3 spines and 8-9 soft rays.

== Ecology ==
In the Seychelles

The slender grouper is carnivorous, feeding mainly on other fish (such as goatfish) but possibly also on invertebrates.

=== Mimicry ===
Juvenile, in Kenya

Juvenile slender groupers are mimics of Halichoeres wrasses. It is hypothesized that they are aggressive mimics that feed on prey mistaking them for the harmless wrasses. Mimicked species may include the initial phases of H. leucurus, H. melanurus, H. richmondi, and H. chrysotaenia, and possible H. biocellatus.

== Conservation ==
The slender grouper is considered to be a Least Concern species by the IUCN; this is because it has a very wide range and populations do not seem to be in decline. It is not fished commercially but is occasionally seen in the fish markets of Hong Kong and of mainland China.

== Gallery ==
Juvenile, in the Seychelles

In Indonesia

With jaws open, in Indonesia
