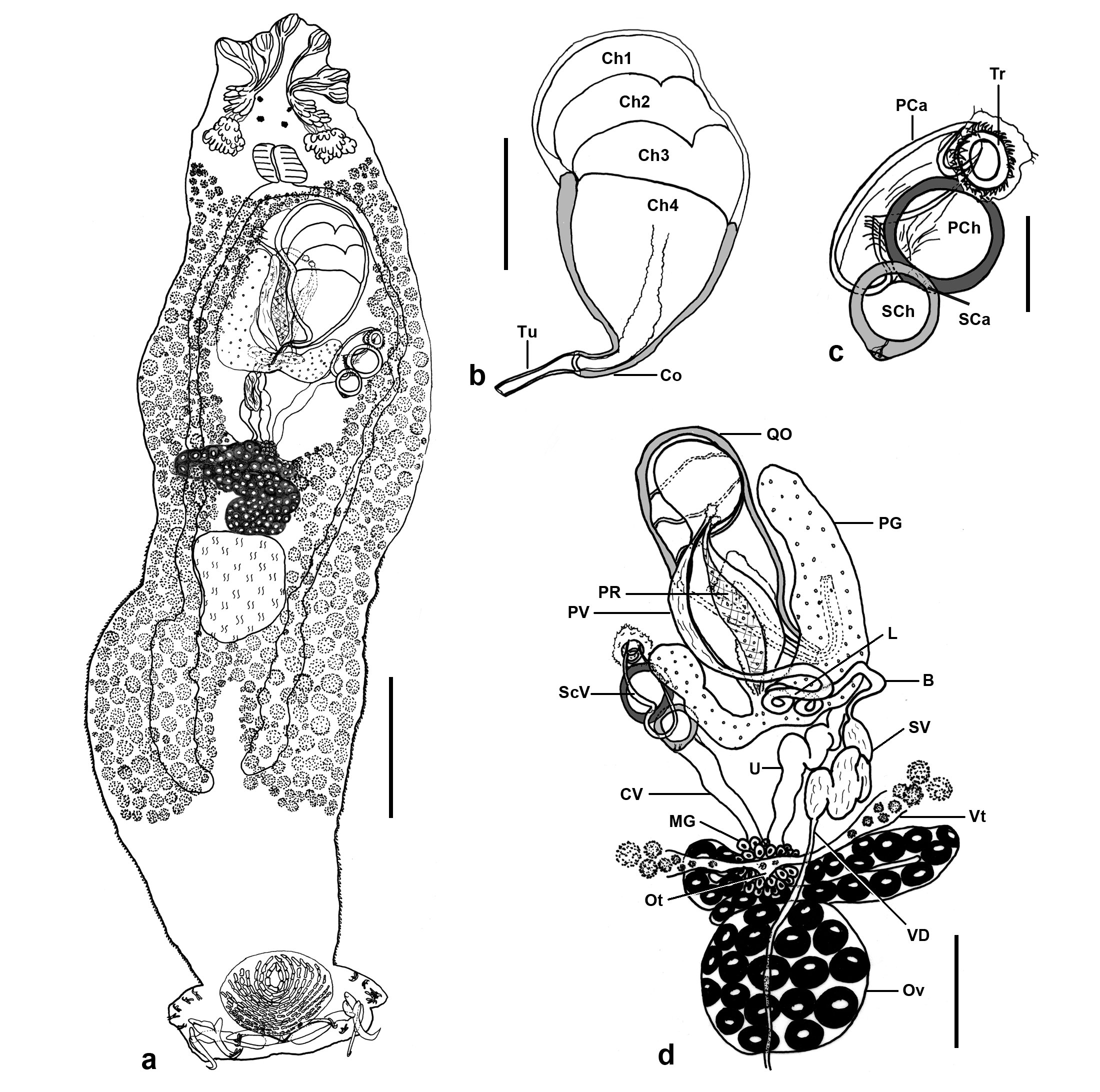
- Pseudorhabdosynochus jeanloui, body (left) and sclerotised organs and anatomy (right)

Scientific classification
- Kingdom: Animalia
- Phylum: Platyhelminthes
- Class: Monogenea
- Order: Dactylogyridea
- Family: Diplectanidae
- Genus: Pseudorhabdosynochus
- Species: P. jeanloui

Binomial name
- Pseudorhabdosynochus jeanloui Knoff, Cohen, Cárdenas, Cárdenas-Callirgos & Gomes, 2015

= Pseudorhabdosynochus jeanloui =

Species of flatworm

Pseudorhabdosynochus jeanloui is a diplectanid monogenean parasitic on the gills of the Pacific creolefish, Paranthias colonus (Perciformes, Serranidae). It has been described in 2015 by Knoff, Cohen, Cárdenas, Cárdenas-Callirgos & Gomes.

== Description ==
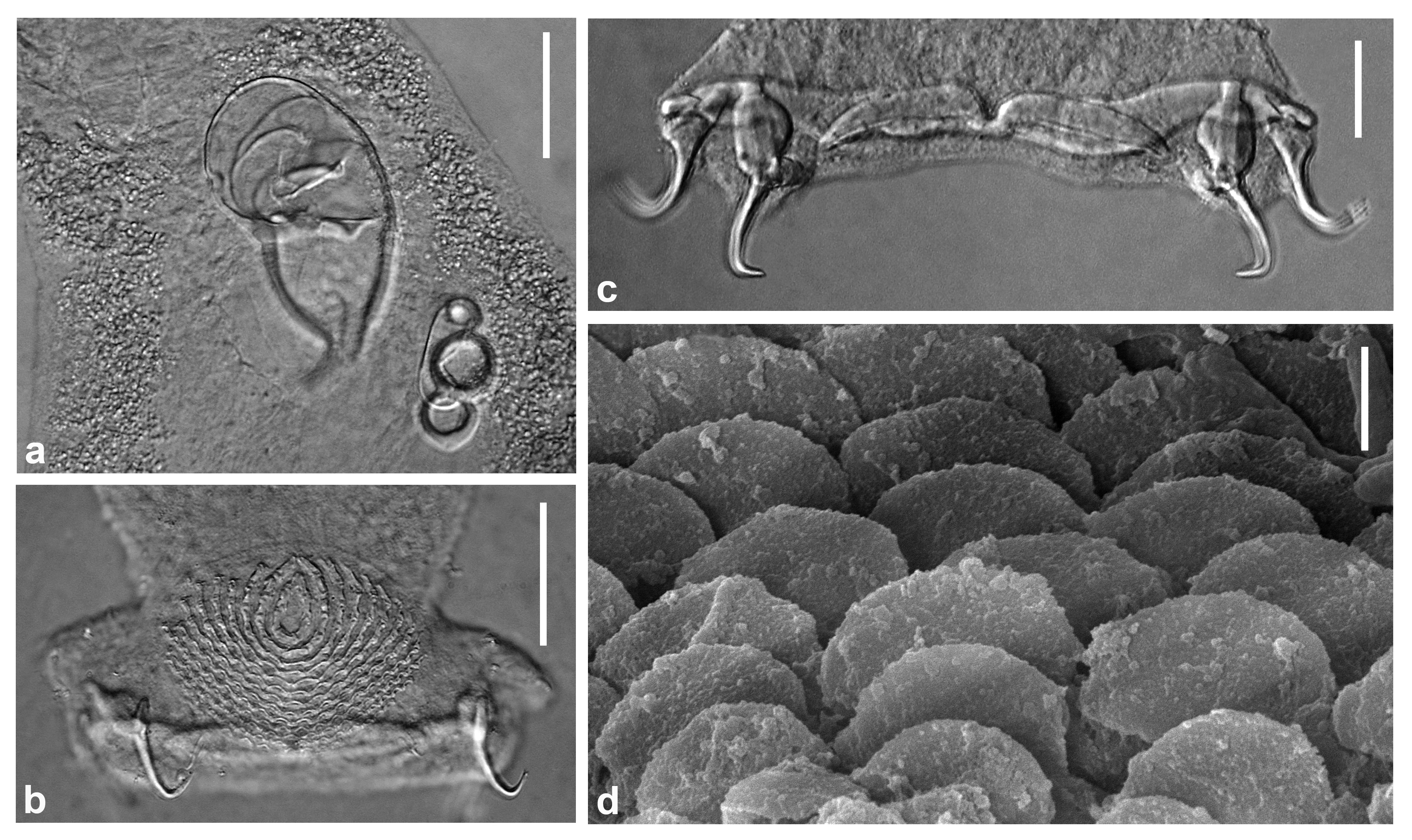
Pseudorhabdosynochus jeanloui, various organs

Pseudorhabdosynochus jeanloui is a small monogenean, 0.6-0.0 mm in length. The species has the general characteristics of other species of Pseudorhabdosynochus, with a flat body and a posterior haptor, which is the organ by which the monogenean attaches itself to the gill of is host. The haptor bears two squamodiscs, one ventral and one dorsal.

The sclerotized male copulatory organ, or "quadriloculate organ", has the shape of a bean with four internal chambers, as in other species of Pseudorhabdosynochus. The vagina includes a sclerotized part, which is a complex structure.

== Etymology ==
The authors of the species wrote that Pseudorhabdosynochus jeanloui was named after French parasitologist Jean-Lou Justine.

== Hosts and localities ==
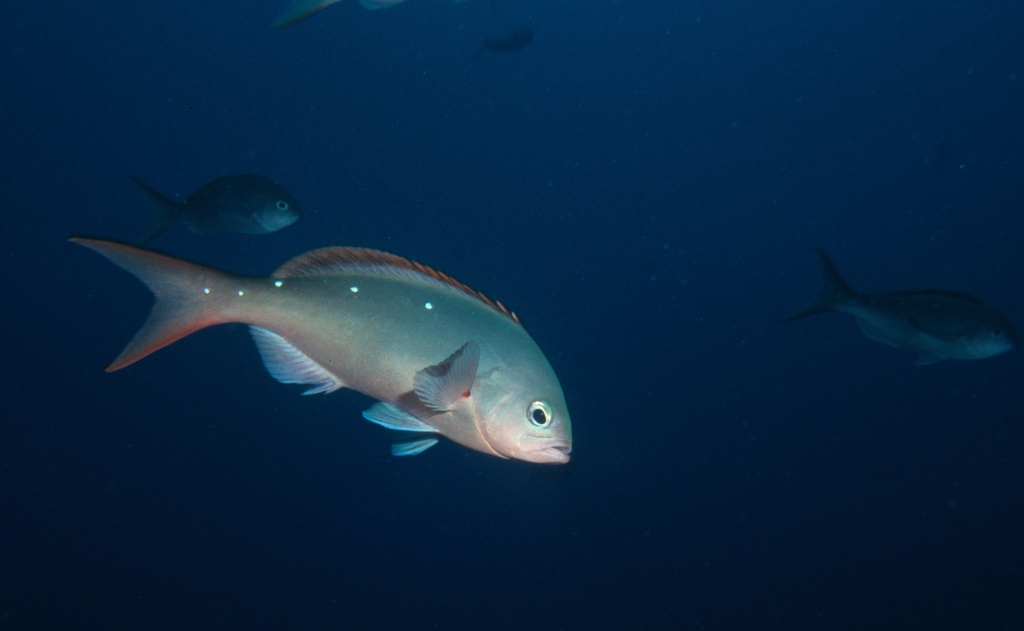
The Pacific creolefish, Paranthias colonus is the host of Pseudorhabdosynochus jeanloui

The type-host of P. jeanloui is the Pacific creolefish, Paranthias colonus (Perciformes, Serranidae). The type-locality is off Chorrillos, Lima, Peru.
