= Cephalopholis colonus =

Pacific creolefish
- In the Gulf of California

Conservation status
- Least Concern (IUCN 3.1)

Scientific classification
- Kingdom: Animalia
- Phylum: Chordata
- Class: Actinopterygii
- Division: Teleostei
- Order: Perciformes
- Family: Epinephelidae
- Genus: Cephalopholis
- Species: C. colonus

Binomial name
- Cephalopholis colonus (Valenciennes, 1846)

Synonyms
- Serranus colonus Valenciennes, 1846; Paranthias colonus Valenciennes, 1846; Paranthias pinguis Walford, 1936

Species of fish

Cephalopholis colonus, commonly known as the Pacific creolefish, is a species of grouper found in the tropical Eastern Pacific Ocean. These schooling semi-pelagic marine fish feed on zooplankton, and large numbers of them are fished for human consumption in certain parts of its range.

== Taxonomy ==
Cephalopholis colonus was historically known as Paranthias colonus. However, this changed when genetic analyses showed that the two species of Paranthias were deeply nested within Cephalopholis. Cephalopholis colonus is sister to Paranthias furcifer. Together, the two species are commonly known as creolefishes.

== Distribution ==
The Pacific creolefish occurs in the Eastern Pacific Ocean, from as far north as the Gulf of California to as far south as Peru. This includes the Revillagigedo, Galapagos, Clipperton, Cocos Island, and Malpelo islands.

== Description ==
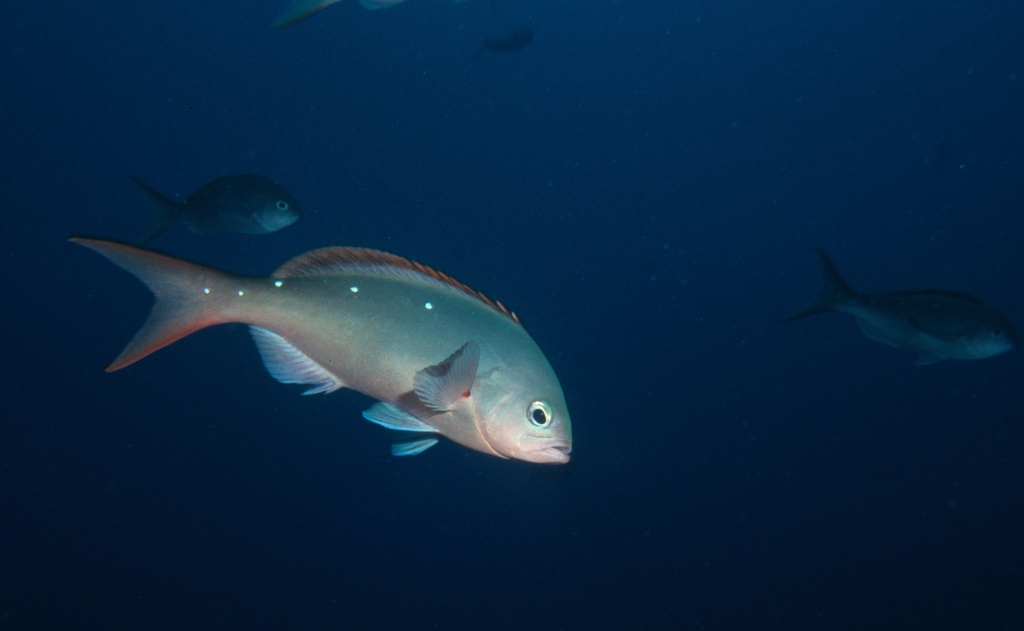
In the Galapagos

Pacific creolefish grow up to 38 centimetres (15 in) in length (TL), although they are most commonly found at a length of 30–32 centimetres (12–13 in). Males and females are approximately the same size.

There are 37–44 gill rakers. The dorsal fin has 9 spines and 18–21 rays, the anal fin has 3 spines and 9–11 rays, and the pectoral fin has 19–23 rays. The caudal fin is deeply forked.

The colouration is reddish or reddish grey, with 4–5 bright spots across the body of the fish. Juveniles are pinkish yellow.

== Biology ==
In Costa Rica

C. colonus and its sister species Paranthias furcifer represent an unusual evolutionary transition from the benthic lifestyle of other Cephalopholis species to a semi-pelagic one. This includes acquiring traits such as a deeply forked tail, small teeth, and high gill raker count. Nonetheless, their benthic ancestry is still evident in their preference to hide in crevices instead of swimming away from danger, like other groupers.

The Pacific creolefish feeds on zooplankton that they pick individually from the water column. Common prey includes ostracods and mysid shrimp. They also feed on gastropods, sea snails of the genus Natica are of particular importance. It is often the most abundant fish in rocky reefs. It is often found at sea mounts and exposed rocky reefs with strong currents. Pacific creolefish are abundant at a wide range of depths, from shallow waters to depths as deep as 64 metres (210 ft).

They often form massive schools of over 1000 individuals, however, spawning occurs in much smaller groups of 8–20 individuals, swimming towards the surface to spawn. During courtship, fish change colour between three color phases: a typical red livery, a dark livery where the five light spots stand out, and a light livery with dark irregular spots. Multiple groups are often spawning at the same time. In both sexes, sexual maturity occurs on average at a length of 27 centimetres (11 in). Pacific creolefish have two breeding cycles each year. In Jalisco, they breed from March to June and from November to December.

== Utilization ==
The Pacific creolefish is often fished as bait for larger fish species, such as other groupers. Around the 1990s however, the species started being increasingly fished for food as larger fish species became less common. Annual landings of the species increased from 60 to 110 tons between 2003 to 2007. It is one of the most important species for small-scale reef fisheries in the Gulf of California.

There is no detected decline in the Pacific creolefish population, however, it is vulnerable to the targeting of spawning aggregations; landings of the species in the Gulf of California peak during spawning season.

== Parasites ==
As all fish species, the Pacific creolefish harbours a number of parasites, including, off Mexico, the digeneans Prodistomum orientalis, Brachyphallus sp., Lecithochirium sp., the nematodes Anisakis sp. and Spinitectus sp., the copepods Caligus sp., and the isopods Hatschekia sp. The diplectanid monogenean Pseudorhabdosynochus jeanloui was described in 2015 from this fish off Peru.

== Gallery ==
Schooling

In the Galapagos

In Panama

In Panama

In the Gulf of California

In the Gulf of California

At Isla Socorro

Juvenile
