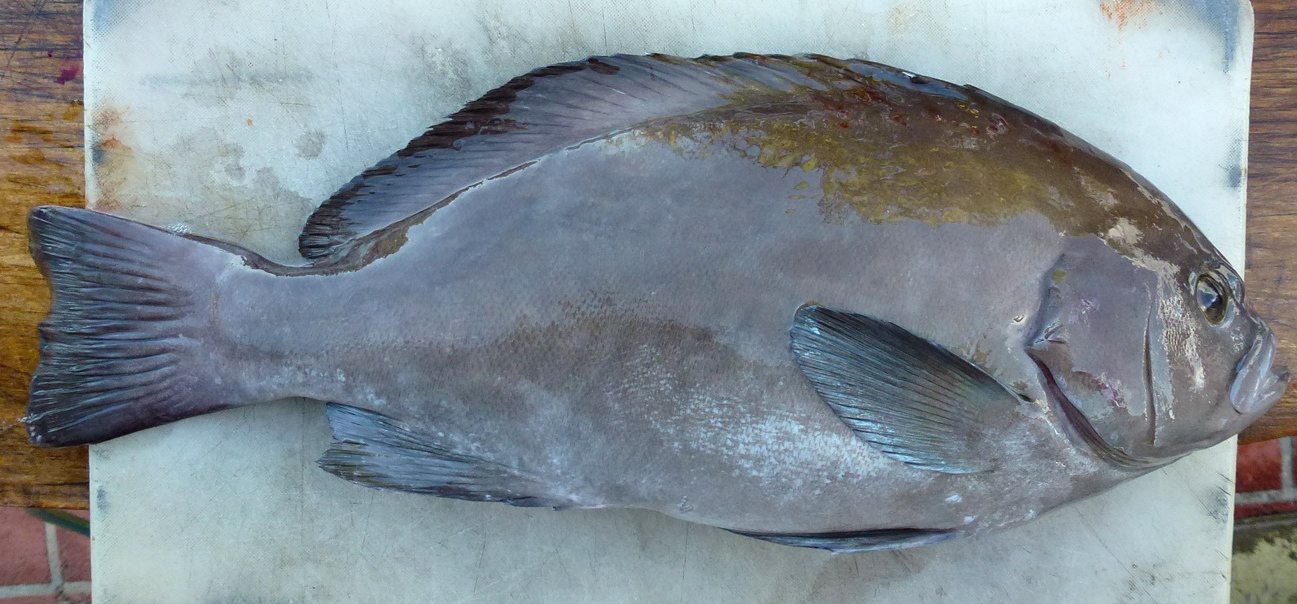

Conservation status
- Least Concern (IUCN 3.1)

Scientific classification
- Kingdom: Animalia
- Phylum: Chordata
- Class: Actinopterygii
- Division: Teleostei
- Order: Perciformes
- Family: Epinephelidae
- Genus: Triso; J.E. Randall, G.D. Johnson & G.R. Lowe, 1989
- Species: T. dermopterus

Binomial name
- Triso dermopterus Temminck & Schlegel, 1842

Synonyms
- List: Serranus dermopterus Temminck & Schlegel, 1842; Trisotropis dermopterus (Temminck & Schlegel, 1842); Hyporthodus dermopterus (Temminck & Schlegel 1843); Altiserranus woorei Whitley, 1951

= Oval grouper =

Species of fish

The oval grouper (Triso dermopterus) also known as the blackfin grouper, melon-seed grouper or oval rockcod, is a species of marine ray-finned fish, a grouper from the subfamily Epinephelinae which is part of the family Serranidae, which also includes the anthias and sea basses. It is found in the Western Pacific Ocean.

== Taxonomy ==
The oval grouper was first formally described in 1842 as Serranus dermopterus in 1842 by the Dutch zoologist Coenraad Jacob Temminck (1778-1858) and his student, the German ichthyologist Hermann Schlegel (1804–1884), with the type locality given as Nagasaki. In 1910 the American ichthyologists David Starr Jordan (1851–1931) and Robert Earl Richardson (1877–1935) placed the species in the genus Trisotropis which is now a synonym of Mycteroperca. However, this species does not closely resemble any species of Mycteroperca and this species was placed in the monotypic genus Triso by J.E. Randall, G.D. Johnson & G.R. Lowe in 1989.

In 2018 a genetic study of the groupers found that the oval grouper fell within the genus Hyporthodus, but Fishbase retains it within Triso.

== Distribution ==
The oval grouper is found in the eastern Indian Ocean and Western Pacific Ocean where it has an anti-tropical distribution. In the Northern Hemisphere it has been recorded from Korea, Japan, Taiwan, Hong Kong and the Fujian. In the Southern Hemisphere it is found off the Dampier Archipelago in Western Australia, and from southern Queensland south as far as Wallis Lake, New South Wales.

== Description ==
The oval grouper has a compressed, oval-shaped body and its depth is 2.0 to 2.8 times its standard length. It has an oblique mouth and the lower jaw projects beyond the upper jaw. The dorsal profile of the head is convex while the intraorbital area is rather wide and convex. The preopercle is not smoothly rounded, but is not sharply angled, and has fine serration on its margin which are enlarged at its angle. The gill cover has a convex upper edge and has three flat spines. The dorsal fin contains 11 spines and 19–21 soft rays while the anal fin contains 3 spines and 9–12 soft rays. The caudal fin is truncate to emarginate with rounded corners.

The colouration is dark brown or violet-black on the body with darker fins. This species attains a maximum recorded total length of 68 centimetres (27 in).

== Habitat and biology ==
The oval grouper has been recorded over on rocky or soft bottoms, consisting of sand or silty mud, at depths of 22 to 103 metres (72 to 338 ft). The juveniles are known to feed on zooplankton in the water column.

== Utilisation ==
The oval grouper is frequently taken as by-catch by fishers using bottom trawls and it is valued as a food fish.
