= Pseudorhabdosynochus variabilis =

Scientific classification
- Kingdom: Animalia
- Phylum: Platyhelminthes
- Class: Monogenea
- Order: Dactylogyridea
- Family: Diplectanidae
- Genus: Pseudorhabdosynochus
- Species: P. variabilis

Binomial name
- Pseudorhabdosynochus variabilis Justine, 2008

Species of flatworm

Pseudorhabdosynochus variabilis is a diplectanid monogenean parasitic on the gills of the grouper Epinephelus morrhua. It has been described in 2008.

== Description ==
Pseudorhabdosynochus variabilis is a small monogenean, 300–500 μm in length. The species has the general characteristics of other species of Pseudorhabdosynochus, with a flat body and a posterior haptor, which is the organ by which the monogenean attaches itself to the gill of is host. The haptor bears two squamodiscs, one ventral and one dorsal. The sclerotized male copulatory organ, or "quadriloculate organ", has the shape of a bean with four internal chambers, as in other species of Pseudorhabdosynochus.

The vagina includes a sclerotized part, which is a complex structure, which changes dramatically according to specimen and orientation.

== Etymology ==
Variabilis is Latin for variable, with reference to the sclerotised vagina.

== Hosts and localities ==
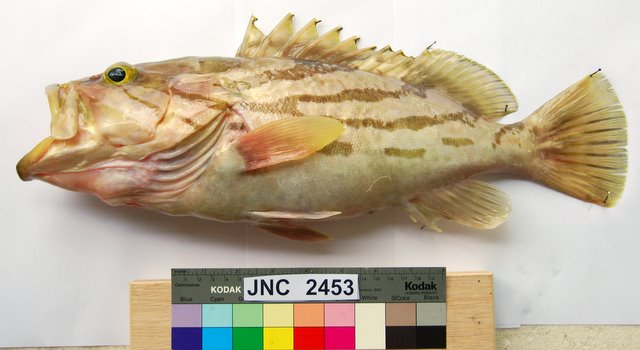
The comet grouper, Epinephelus morrhua, is the host of Pseudorhabdosynochus variabilis

The type-host and only recorded host of P. variabilis is the comet grouper Epinephelus morrhua (Serranidae: Epinephelinae). The type-locality and only recorded locality is off Nouméa, New Caledonia. This grouper also harbours another species of Pseudorhabdosynochus, P. morrhua Justine, 2008.
