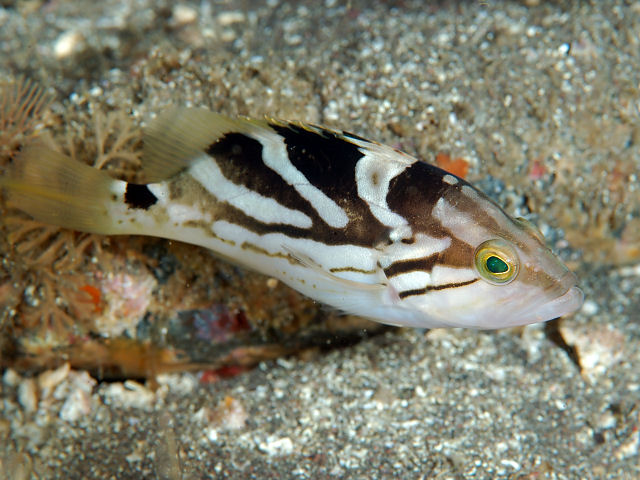

Conservation status
- Least Concern (IUCN 3.1)

Scientific classification
- Kingdom: Animalia
- Phylum: Chordata
- Class: Actinopterygii
- Order: Perciformes
- Family: Epinephelidae
- Genus: Epinephelus
- Species: E. morrhua

Binomial name
- Epinephelus morrhua Valenciennes, 1833

Synonyms
- Serranus morrhua Valenciennes, 1833; Cephalopholis morrhua (Valenciennes, 1833); Epinephelus cometae Tanaka, 1927

= Comet grouper =

Species of fish

The comet grouper (Epinephelus morrhua), also known as the comet cod or dot-dash grouper, is a species of marine ray-finned fish, a grouper from the subfamily Epinephelinae which is part of the family Serranidae, which also includes the anthias and sea basses. It is a species of deep coral reefs in the Indo-Pacific region.

== Description ==
The comet grouper has a body with a standard length which is 2.8 to 3.1 times as long as it is deep. The dorsal profile of the head is moderately convex. The preopercle has enlarged serrations at its angle and it is notched just above the angle. The upper edge of the gill cover is straight. The dorsal fin contains 11 spines and 14-15 soft rays, while the anal fin has 3 spines and 7-8 soft rays. The caudal fin varies from convex to slightly rounded. The head and body tan and they are marked with dark brown bands. There is a forked band starting at the posterior margin of the eye, its upper branch reaching a dark brown saddle-like blotch on the nape just in before of origin of the dorsal fin while the lower branch runs to lowest of the spines on the gill cover before continuing along the flanks and then forking over the pectoral fin. The upper part of this band runs to a dark blotch at the base of the soft rayed part of the dorsal fin. Another dark band runs from the upper margin of the gill cover to the base of spiny part of the dorsal fin. There is also a narrow band which runs from the lower margin of the orbit to the base of the pectoral fin and then continues as a broken line along the lower part of body curving upwards on to the upper part of caudal peduncle. There is another wide band from maxillary groove to rear end of interopercle. The areas between these bands are frequently marked with small brown spots. This species attains a maximum published total length of 90 centimetres (35 in), although they a more commonly found at lengths around 60 centimetres (24 in), and a maximum published weight of 6.7 kilograms (15 lb).

== Distribution ==
The comet grouper has a wide Indo-Pacific distribution and is found from the Red Sea southwards along the African coast to South Africa and east through the Indian Ocean, including the Comoros, Madagascar, Aldabra, Mauritius, Chagos and Réunion, and on into the Pacific. In the Western Pacific Ocean it extends as far north as southern Japan and the Ogasawara Islands and as far south as New South Wales in Australia. It reaches New Caledonia, Fiji, Rotuma and the Cook Islands.

== Habitat and biology ==
The comet grouper is found near coral reefs on slopes off islands, of sea mounts or the continental shelf at depths from 80 to 370 m (260 to 1,210 ft) where it feeds on benthic fish and large invertebrates. Its biology is poorly understood. This species harbours several parasite species, including the diplectanid monogeneans Pseudorhabdosynochus morrhua and P. variabilis.

== Taxonomy ==
The comet grouper was first formally described as Serranus morhua in 1828 by the French zoologist Achille Valenciennes (1794-1865) with the type locality given as Mauritius. It is sometimes confused with its relatives E. poecilonotus, E. radiatus, and E. tuamotoensis.

== Utilisation ==
The comet grouper is not a common fish at market, despite being regarded as an excellent food fish, probably due to the depths at which it is found. Ciguatoxins have been found in fish caught off Mauritius.
