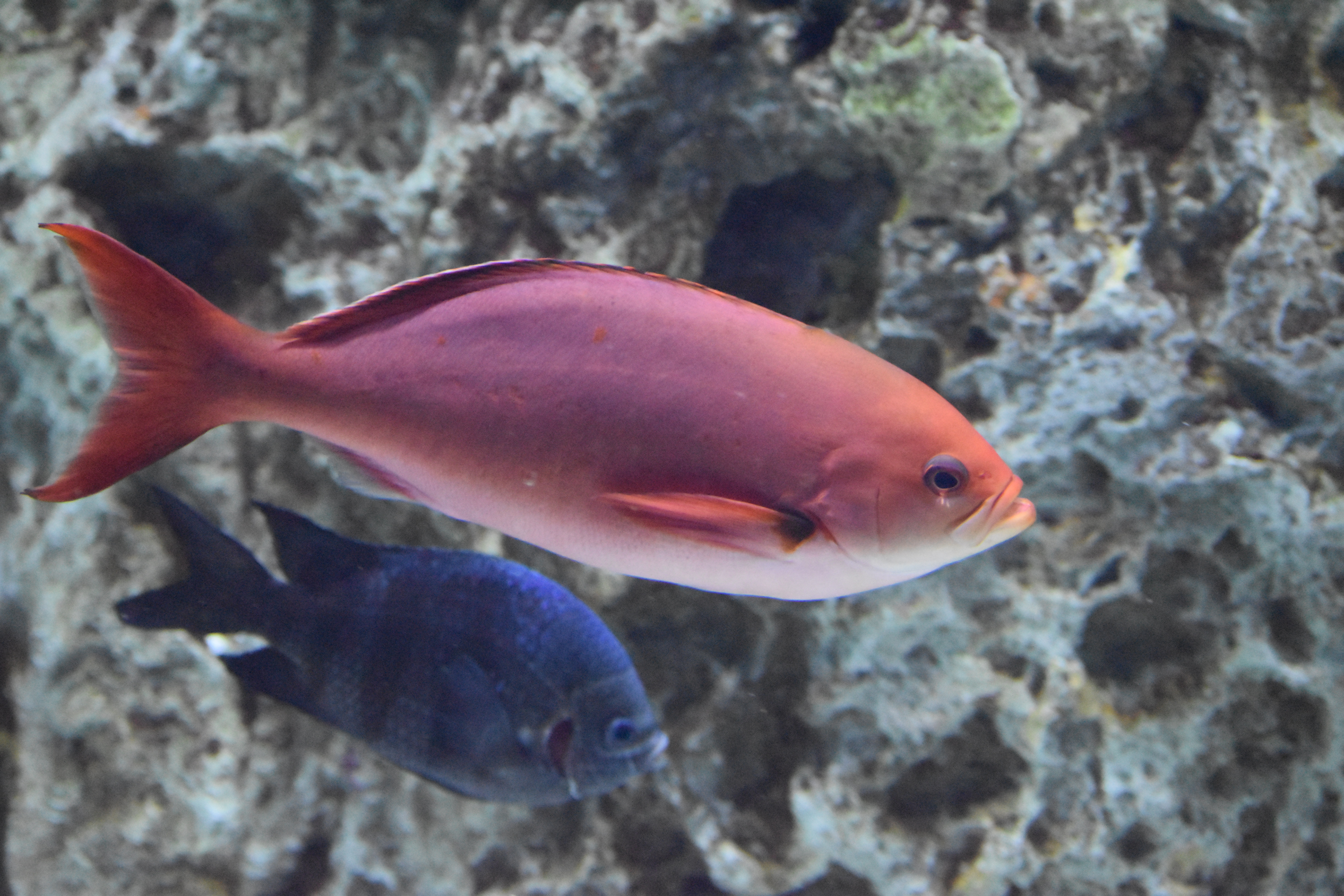
- P. furcifer (Atlantic creolefish)

Conservation status
- Least Concern (IUCN 3.1)

Scientific classification
- Kingdom: Animalia
- Phylum: Chordata
- Class: Actinopterygii
- Division: Teleostei
- Order: Perciformes
- Family: Epinephelidae
- Genus: Paranthias; Guichenot, 1868
- Species: P. furcifer

Binomial name
- Paranthias furcifer (Valenciennes, 1828)

Synonyms
- Brachyrhinus Gill, 1863; Creolus Jordan & Gilbert, 1883

= Paranthias =

Genus of fishes

Paranthias is a monotypic genus of marine ray-finned fish which are commonly referred to as creolefish. They are groupers from the family Epinephelidae which are found in the Atlantic Ocean and the eastern Pacific Ocean. Unlike other groupers, they are filter feeders like the distantly related "true" anthias.

== Taxonomy ==
The genus Paranthias was created in 1863 by the American ichthyologist Theodore Nicholas Gill (1837–1914) as a monotypic genus; it contained only the type species Serranus furcifer. The Pacific creole-fish was considered conspecific with the creolefish until it was accepted as a distinct species. The name is a combination of para- (near/resembling) and anthias, alluding to their superficial resemblance to Anthiadines such as Anthias.

Groupers were formerly considered part of the family Serranidae as the subfamily Ephinephelinae; this family formerly included the "true" anthias as well, but after Serranidae was revised and split, Paranthias and other groupers are now considered distinct from the true anthias. The elevation of Epinephelidae and Anthiadidae into their own distinct families was eventually accepted by multiple taxonomic authorities, such as the World Register of Marine Species (WoRMS), Eschmeyer's Catalog of Fishes (ECoF), and the International Union for Conservation of Nature.

Some taxonomic resources consider Paranthias to be a junior synonym of Cephalopholis, as suggested by phylogenetic analyses using molecular data, as well as the intermediate form known as "Menephorus" known from the Caribbean, which has been proven to be a hybrid between Paranthias furcifer and Cephalopholis fulva.

== Characteristics ==
Creolefish are unique among the typically macropredatory groupers in that they have a relatively small mouth, their upper jaws are more protrusible than that of other groupers, with small teeth and many elongated gill rakers, and a fusiform body which ends in a deeply forked caudal fin. These departures from the typical morphology of groupers are adaptations for feeding on zooplankton in open water, which converge on the niche of true anthias. Paranthias are visual hunters, having a relatively short snout which allows them to employ binocular vision to pick off zooplankton from the middle of the water column. They are social fish which are normally seen in diurnal feeding aggregations, diving to shelter in the reef when threatened. They reach a maximum total length of 30–36 centimetres (12–14 in).

== Distribution ==
The genus Paranthias is found mainly in the warmer waters of the western Atlantic Ocean but its range extends to Ascension Island and the islands in the Gulf of Guinea in the eastern Atlantic, as well as in the Mediterranean.
