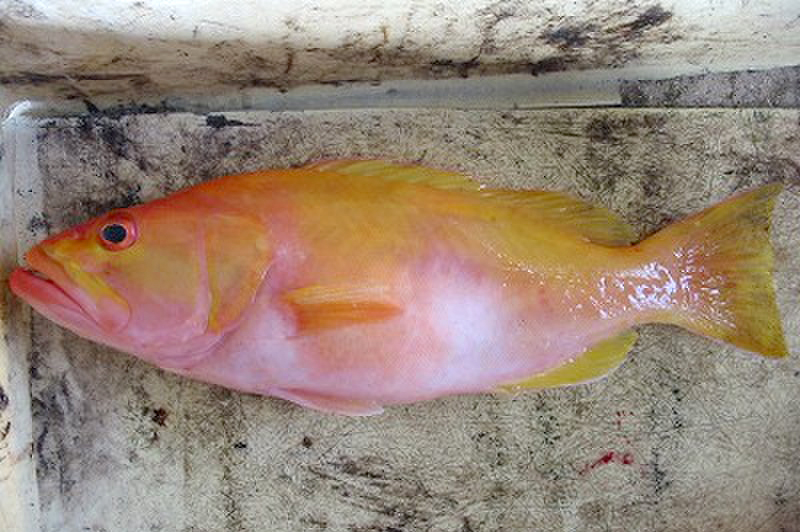

Conservation status
- Least Concern (IUCN 3.1)

Scientific classification
- Kingdom: Animalia
- Phylum: Chordata
- Class: Actinopterygii
- Division: Teleostei
- Order: Perciformes
- Suborder: Percoidei
- Family: Epinephelidae
- Genus: Saloptia; J. L. B. Smith, 1964
- Species: S. powelli

Binomial name
- Saloptia powelli J. L. B. Smith, 1964

Synonyms
- Plectropomus powelli (J. L. B. Smith, 1964)

= Golden grouper =

Species of fish

The golden grouper (Saloptia powelli), also known as the pink grouper or Powell's grouper, is a species of marine ray-finned fish, a grouper from the subfamily Epinephelinae which is part of the family Serranidae, which also includes the anthias and sea basses. It is found in the eastern Indian Ocean and Western Pacific Ocean.

== Taxonomy ==
The golden grouper was first formally described in 1964 by the South African ichthyologist James Leonard Brierley Smith (1897-1968) with the type locality given as the Cook Islands. Smith stated that it was closely related to the groupers in the genus Plectropomus but differs in its dentition and in the greater rigidity of the spines in its dorsal and anal fins and created the monotypic genus Saloptia for it. However, other authorities place this species within the genus Plectropomus but as well as the physical differences this species of the oceanic "twilight zone" has a different habitat preference to the shallow water coral groupers, although its place within Plectropomus has been suggested by molecular studies.

== Distribution ==
The golden grouper is found in the eastern Indian Ocean and the Western Pacific Ocean from Christmas Island and the South China Sea east to French Polynesia, north to Taiwan and Okinawa south as far as the Great Barrier Reef.

== Description ==
The golden grouper has a robust, oblong body and its depth is 2.6 to 3.1 times its standard length. The head's dorsal profile is convex, although the intraorbital region is flat. The preopercle is not smooth rounded, but it is not steeply inclined, and it contains three huge curving spines on its bottom edge as well as very minor serrations at its angle. The preopercular spines are mostly covered in skin. The gill cover has a markedly convex upper edge. The dorsal fin contains 8 spines and 8 soft rays while the anal fin contains 3 spines and 8 soft rays. The caudal fin is emarginate. The head, body, and fins are yellow to orange-yellow, shading on the underparts to white or pink. The snout, lips and opper portion of the head are tinted with red and the spines in the dorsal fin are occasionally marked with red streaks. This species attains a maximum recorded total length of 39 centimetres (15 in).

== Habitat and biology ==
The golden grouper is a rariphotic species which inhabits a depth range of 100 to 200 metres (330 to 660 ft), where it occurs over rocky substrates.

== Utilisation ==
The golden grouper is an uncommon species but it is regarded as an important food fish in the Ryukyu Islands of southern Japan. In the Marianas it is one of the most commonly landed deep water grouper species. It is caught using hand lines and drop lines.
