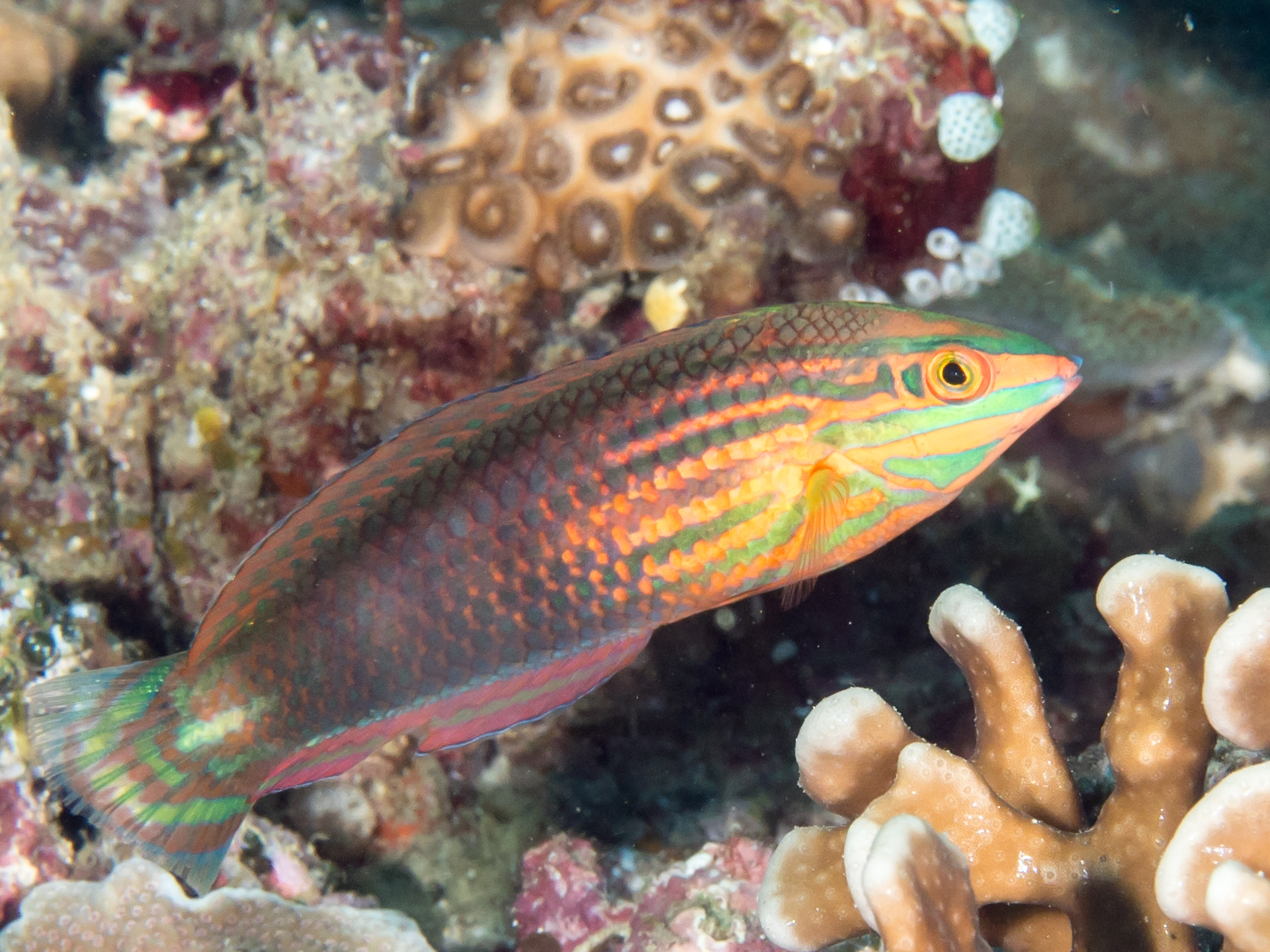

Conservation status
- Least Concern (IUCN 3.1)

Scientific classification
- Kingdom: Animalia
- Phylum: Chordata
- Class: Actinopterygii
- Division: Teleostei
- Order: Labriformes
- Family: Labridae
- Genus: Halichoeres
- Species: H. biocellatus

Binomial name
- Halichoeres biocellatus L. P. Schultz, 1960

= Red-lined wrasse =

Species of fish

The red-lined wrasse, two-spotted wrasse or biocellated wrasse, Halichoeres biocellatus, is a species of wrasse native to shallow tropical waters in the western Pacific Ocean.

== Description ==
The red-lined wrasse can grow to about 12 cm (4.7 in) in length. Mature males are silvery grey with narrow, longitudinal, red stripes and a dark mark on their caudal peduncles. Females have narrow orange stripes, continuous near the front, but intermittent near the back. Juveniles and females have two distinctive, dark-coloured spots outlined in white on their dorsal fins, one in the middle and one near the back. These may fade as the fish matures. The long, narrow dorsal fin has 9 spines and 12 soft rays. The anal fin has three spines and 11 or 12 soft rays.

== Distribution and habitat ==
The red-lined wrasse is found in the tropical western Pacific Ocean between 32°N and 24°S at depths down to 35 metres (115 ft). Its range includes Japan, Indonesia, the Philippines and Australia, where it is found around the northern coast from Western Australia to New South Wales. It inhabits the seaward side of coral and rocky reefs, usually with sandy patches, and is also found on reef slopes and crests with rock, rubble, and seaweed.

== Ecology ==
Juvenile slender groupers (Anyperodon leucogrammicus) are aggressive mimics of red-lined wrasses. In this form of mimicry, the grouper mimics the wrasse in colouring and behaviour so that a prey fish is tricked into approaching what it thinks is a harmless wrasse and can then be attacked.

== Status ==
The IUCN Red List of Threatened Species lists the red-lined wrasse to be of least concern. Their rationale is that, although populations may be declining slowly in Southeast Asia where the fish is collected for the aquarium trade and where coral reefs are being degraded, this is counterbalanced by populations in Australia which are relatively stable. Also, some of the fish's range falls within marine conservation areas. It is also resilient, having a short growth period before maturity with populations being capable of doubling within 15 months.
