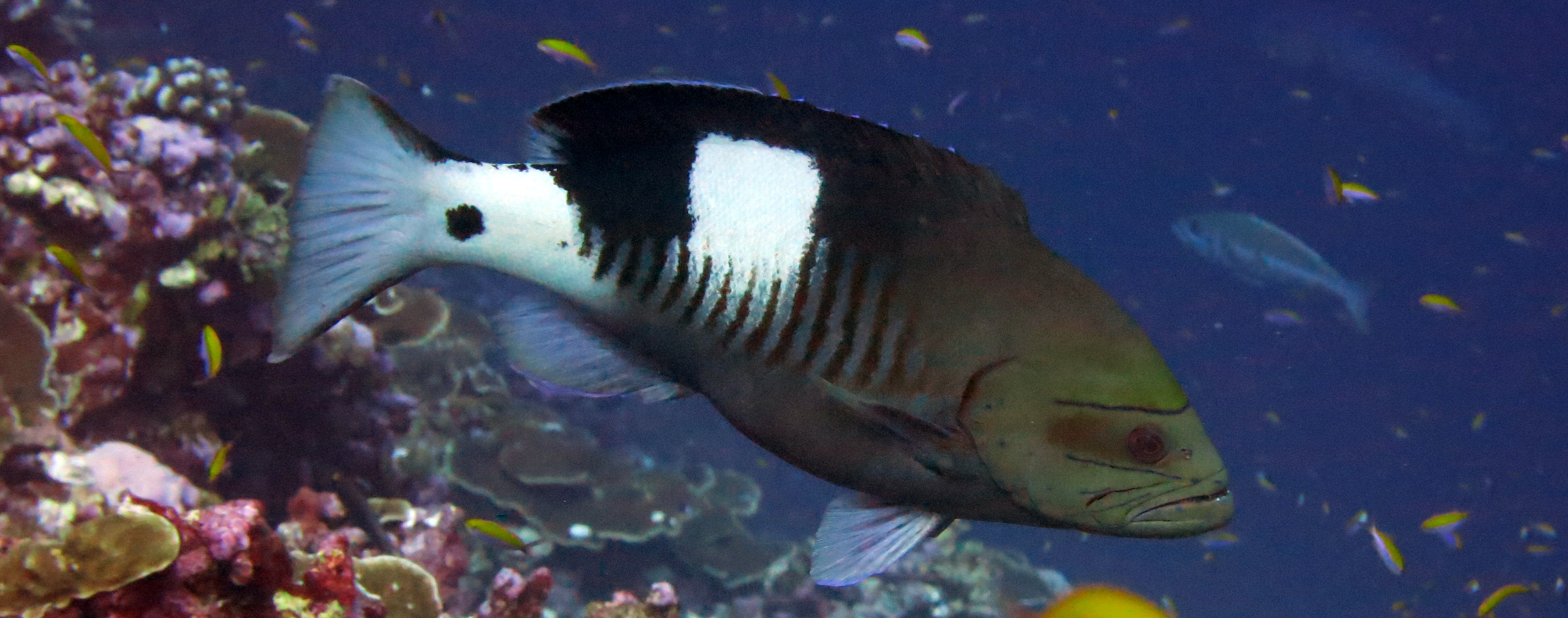
- At Jarvis Island

Conservation status
- Least Concern (IUCN 3.1)

Scientific classification
- Kingdom: Animalia
- Phylum: Chordata
- Class: Actinopterygii
- Order: Perciformes
- Suborder: Percoidei
- Family: Epinephelidae
- Genus: Gracila; Randall, 1964
- Species: G. albomarginata

Binomial name
- Gracila albomarginata (Fowler & B. A. Bean, 1930)

Synonyms
- List: Cephalopholis albomarginatus Fowler & Bean, 1930; Aethaloperca albomarginata (Fowler & Bean, 1930); Epinephelus albomarginatus (Fowler & Bean, 1930); Gracila albomarginatus (Fowler & Bean, 1930)

= Masked grouper =

Species of fish

The masked grouper (Gracila albomarginata), also known as the thinspine grouper, rededged cod, red-edged grouper, slenderspine grouper, thinspine rockcod, white-margined grouper, white-square cod or white-square grouper, is a species of marine ray-finned fish, a grouper from the subfamily Epinephelinae which is part of the family Serranidae, which also includes the anthias and sea basses. It is found in the western Pacific Ocean. It is the only species in the genus Gracila.

== Taxonomy ==
The masked grouper was first formally described as Cephalolopholis albomarginatus in 1930 by the American ichthyologists Henry Weed Fowler (1878-1965) and Barton Appler Bean (1860-1947) with the type locality being given as Danawan Island, vicinity of Sibuko Bay which is in Sabah. In 1964 John E. Randall (1924-2020) placed this species in the monotypic genus Gracila, Genetic studies have placed this species within the genus Cephalopholis.

== Distribution ==
Gracila albomarginata can be found in the Indo-Pacific, from northern Mozambique north to Kenya east to French Polynesia and the northern Great Barrier Reef. Its range includes the islands of Réunion, Mauritius, Seychelles and the Maldives but it has not been recorded in the Red Sea or Persian Gulf. In Australia it is found at Scott Reef and Rowley Shoals in Western Australia, as well as the Great Barrier Reef in Queensland. It also occurs around Christmas Island and the Cocos (Keeling) Islands.

== Description ==
The maximum recorded total length is 45 centimetres (18 in). The masked grouper has an oblong, rather compressed body in which the standard length is 2.6 to 3.3 times its depth. The dorsal profile of the head is convex while the area between the eyes is slightly convex. The preopercle is rounded with fine serratations and with a smooth, fleshy lower margin. The gill cover has a central spine which is located at one-third of the gap between the lower to upper spines and with an upper edge which is distinctly convex The dorsal fin contains 9 spines and 14-16 soft rays while the anal fin has 3 spines and 9-10 soft rays. The membranes between the dorsal fin spines are incised in juveniles but not in adults. The caudal fin is truncate.

This species has a greenish to reddish-brown or brownish-grey body, with a large roughly square-shaped white blotch on the upper flanks and dark diagonal lines on its head. There are narrow dark bars along the middle of the flanks, and a white base to the caudal fin which has a black spot in the centre. The juveniles are colourful being violet with bright red margins on their dorsal, anal and caudal fins.

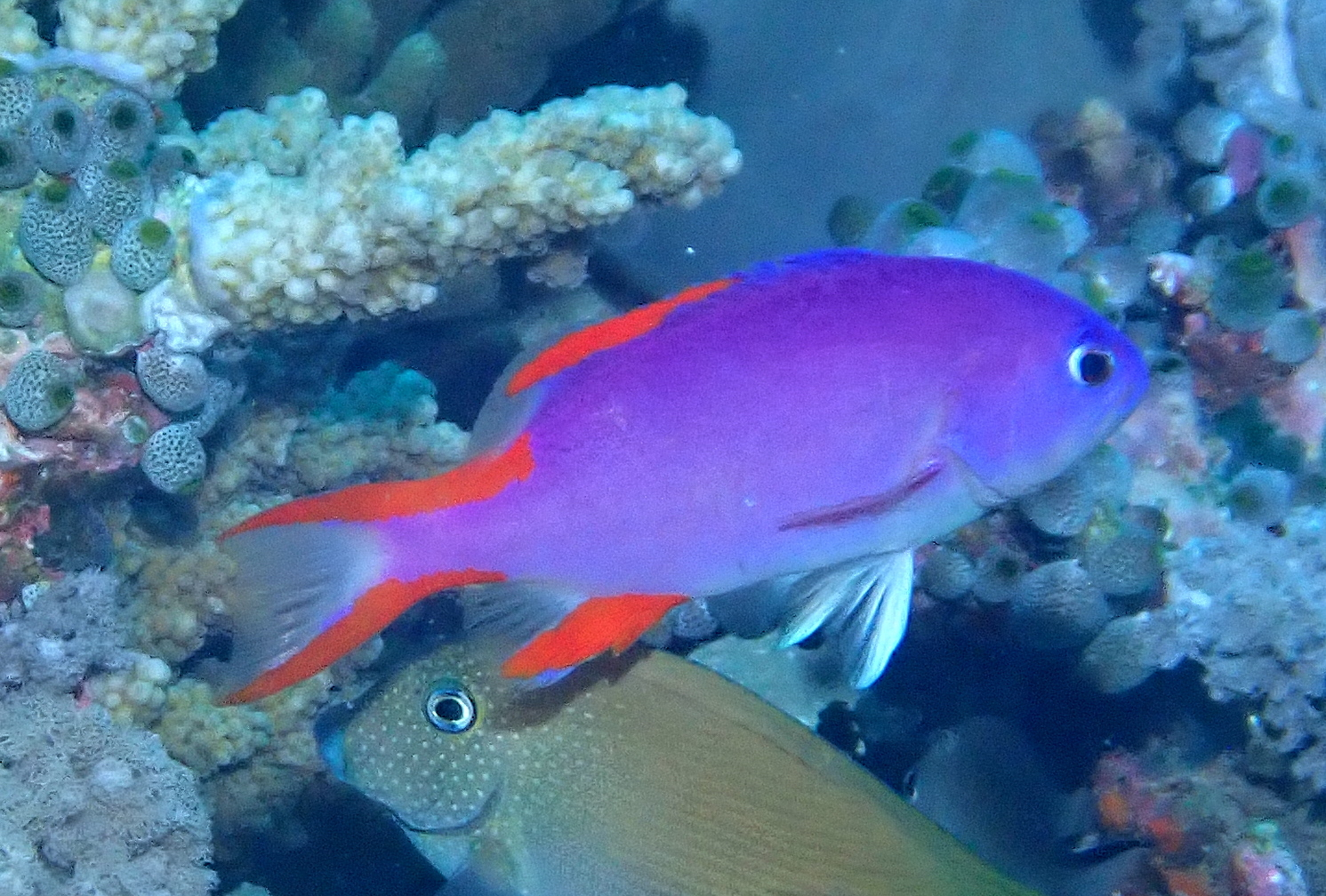
Juvenile

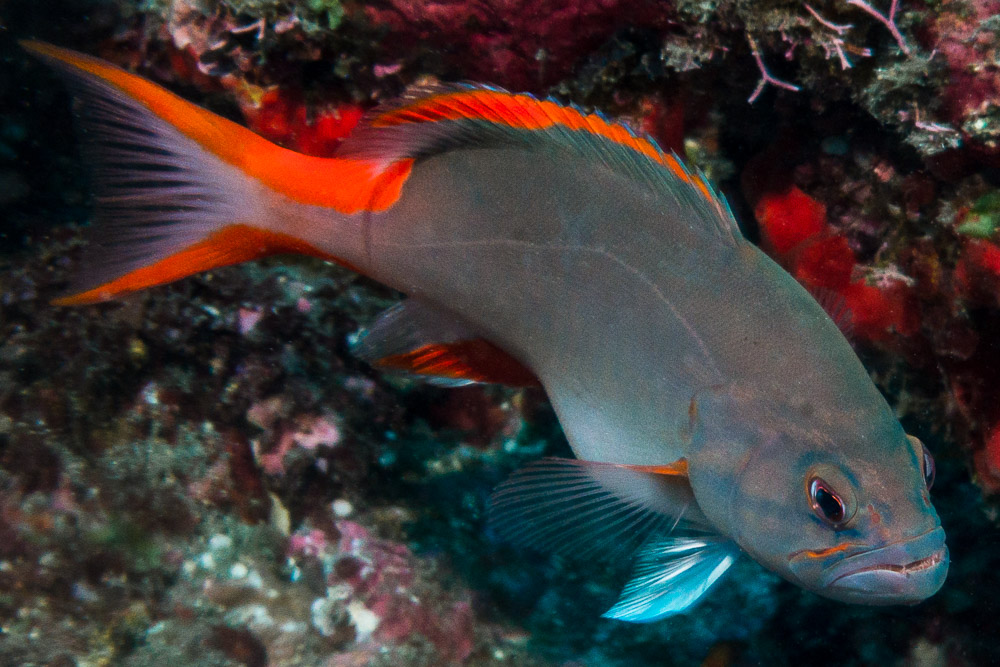
Subadult

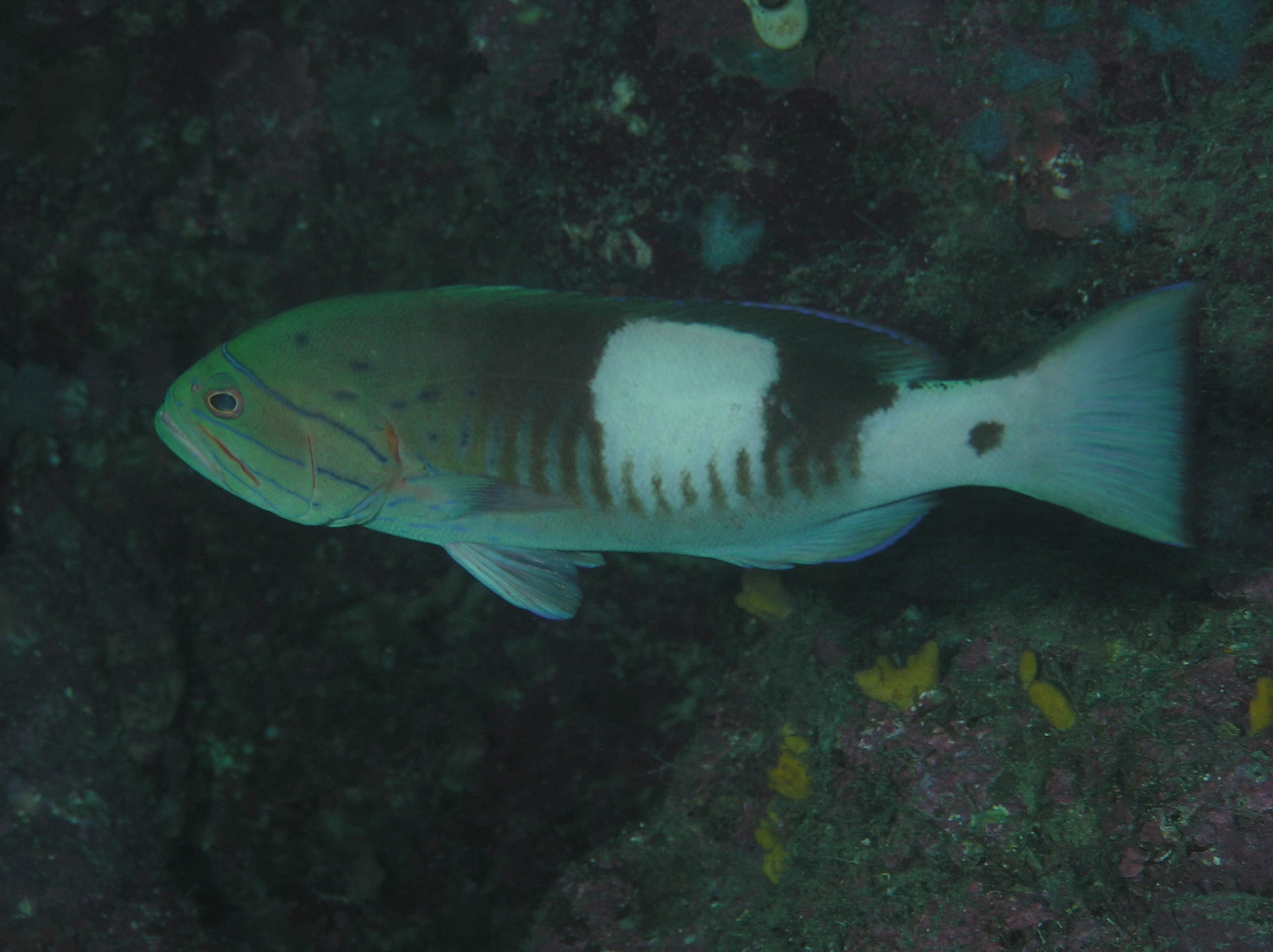
Adult

== Habitat and biology ==
The masked grouper is associated with reefs, normally occurring on the outer slopes of coral reefs and in channels close to deep water. It feeds mainly on fishes which it catches near the bottom. This uncommon species is usually solitary, however, there are records of groups of three or four fish.

== Utilisation ==
The masked grouper is an infrequently caught species by local and artisanal fisheries, and in the Maldives is described as a minir component in the overall catch of groupers.
