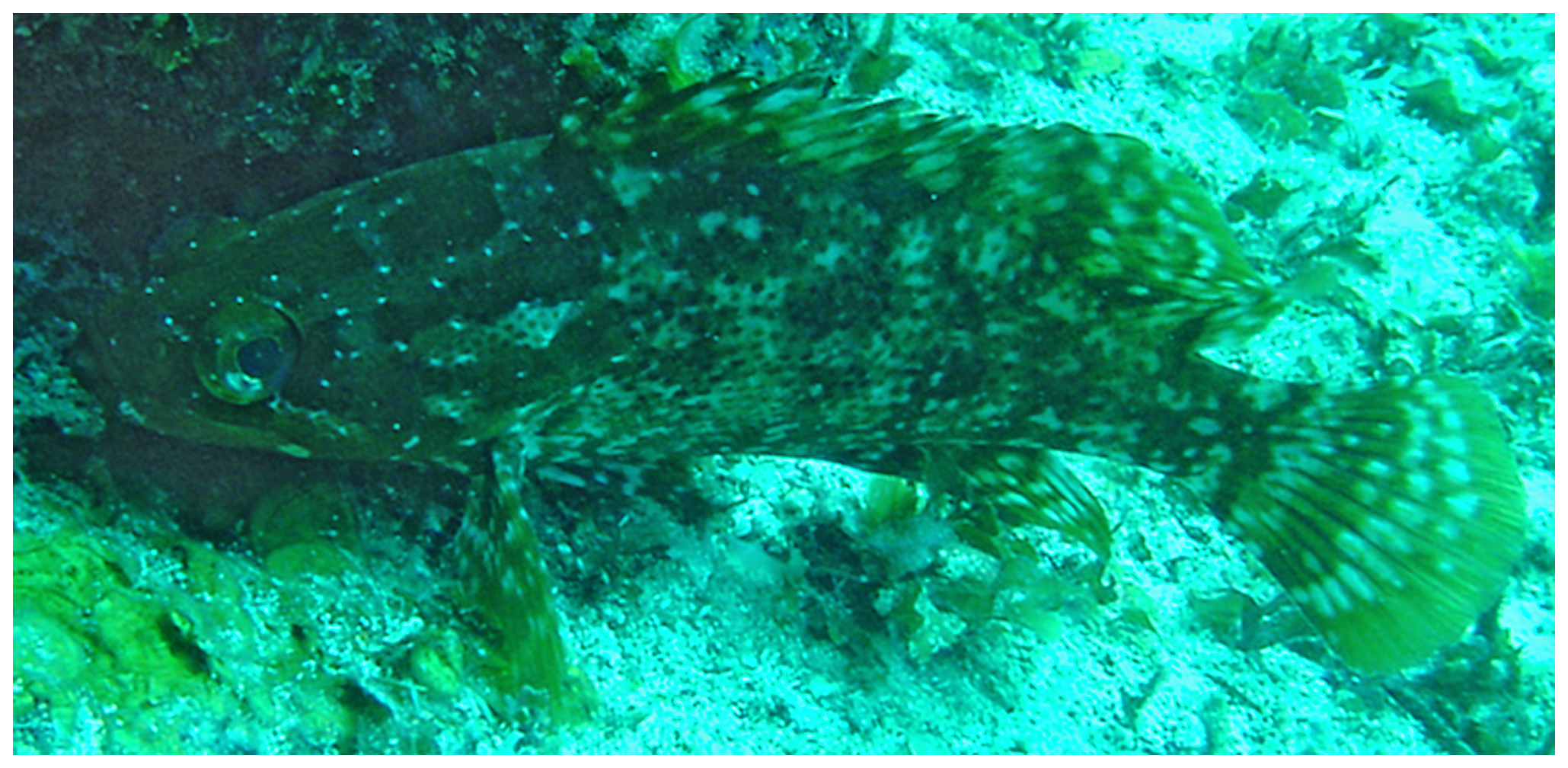
- Alphestes afer

Scientific classification
- Kingdom: Animalia
- Phylum: Chordata
- Class: Actinopterygii
- Order: Perciformes
- Suborder: Percoidei
- Family: Epinephelidae
- Genus: Alphestes; Bloch & Schneider, 1801

Type species
- Epinephelus afer Bloch, 1793

= Alphestes =

Genus of fishes

Alphestes is a genus of marine ray-finned fish, groupers from the subfamily Epinephelinae in the family Serranidae, which also includes the anthias and the sea basses. Alphestes species are found in the western Atlantic Ocean and the eastern Pacific Ocean.

== Species ==
There are three species in the genus:

Species	Common name	Image
Alphestes afer (Bloch, 1793)	Mutton hamlet	
Alphestes immaculatus Breder, 1936	Pacific mutton hamlet	
Alphestes multiguttatus (Günther, 1867)	Rivulated mutton hamlet	
