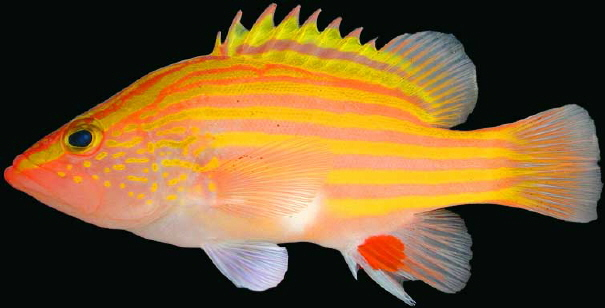

Conservation status
- Least Concern (IUCN 3.1)

Scientific classification
- Kingdom: Animalia
- Phylum: Chordata
- Class: Actinopterygii
- Order: Perciformes
- Suborder: Percoidei
- Family: Epinephelidae
- Genus: Gonioplectrus; Gill, 1862
- Species: G. hispanus

Binomial name
- Gonioplectrus hispanus (Cuvier, 1828)

Synonyms
- Plectropoma hispanum Cuvier, 1828

= Spanish flag (fish) =

Species of fish

The Spanish flag (Gonioplectrus hispanus) is a species of marine ray-finned fish, a grouper from the subfamily Epinephelinae which is part of the family Serranidae, which also includes the anthias and sea basses. It is found in the western Atlantic Ocean. It is the only species in the genus Gonioplectrus.

== Description ==
The Spanish flag has a body which is oblong with a large head, the length of the head is the same as the body's depth. The standard length is 2.3 to 2.5 times the depth of the body. The dorsal profile of the head and the intraorbital area are convex. They have a rounded preopercle which has a large, curved spine at its angle and fleshy lower edge. The central spine on the gill cover is and reaches past the rear of the opercular membrane. The dorsal fin contains 8 spines and 13 soft rays while the anal fin has 3 spines and 7 soft rays. The membranes between the dorsal fin spines are deeplyncised and the spines have fleshy, scale covered bases. The caudal fin is truncate. There are 47-49 scales in the lateral line, which curves upwards underneath the soiny part of the dorsal in and then downwards below the soft-rayed part. The background colour of the head, body, dorsal and caudal fins is yellow and there are 6-7 pink stripes running horizontally from the head to the soft-rayed part of the dorsal fin and the caudal fin. There is a bright red blotch on the anterior part of the anal fin and a white blotch on the side of the belly. The pelvic fins are pinkish purple in colour. This species attains a maximum total length of 30 centimetres (12 in).

== Distribution ==
The Spanish flag occurs in the Western Atlantic Ocean in the Gulf of Mexico where its range extends as far north as Louisiana and the Flower Garden Banks National Marine Sanctuary, the Florida Keys, the Bahamas and northwestern Cuba south to Quintana Roo ion Mexico and the Bay Islands of Honduras. They are also found off Santa Marta in Colombia, east along the South American coast to Venezuela and south to Vitória, Espírito Santo and Trindade island. Vagrants have been recorded as far north as North Carolina.

== Habitat and biology ==
The Spanish flag is a fish of deeper waters and is found at depths of 35 to 460 metres (115 to 1,509 ft). It is a rather solitary species which occurs over hard bottoms and reefs, especially on the edge of the continental shelfwhere there are steep slopes and walls. It is largely piscivorous, feeding on other fishes, but will also prey on benthic crustaceans such as crabs or shrimps.

== Taxonomy ==
Merchant flag of Spain (1785-1927). The fish was named after the flag.

The Spanish flag was first formally described as Plectropoma hispanum in 1828 by the French naturalist Georges Cuvier (1769-1832) with the type locality given as Martinique. In 1862 the American ichthyologist, Theodore Nicholas Gill (1837-1914) placed it in the monotypic genus Gonioplectrus. The relationships of the genus Gonioplectrus to the other groupers are regarded as unclear but it does sit within the subfamily Epinephelinae.

== Utilisation ==
The Spanish flag is a smallish rare species of deeper waters and as such is not targeted by commercial fisheries. However, as a relatively small, colourful species it is found in the aquarium trade.
