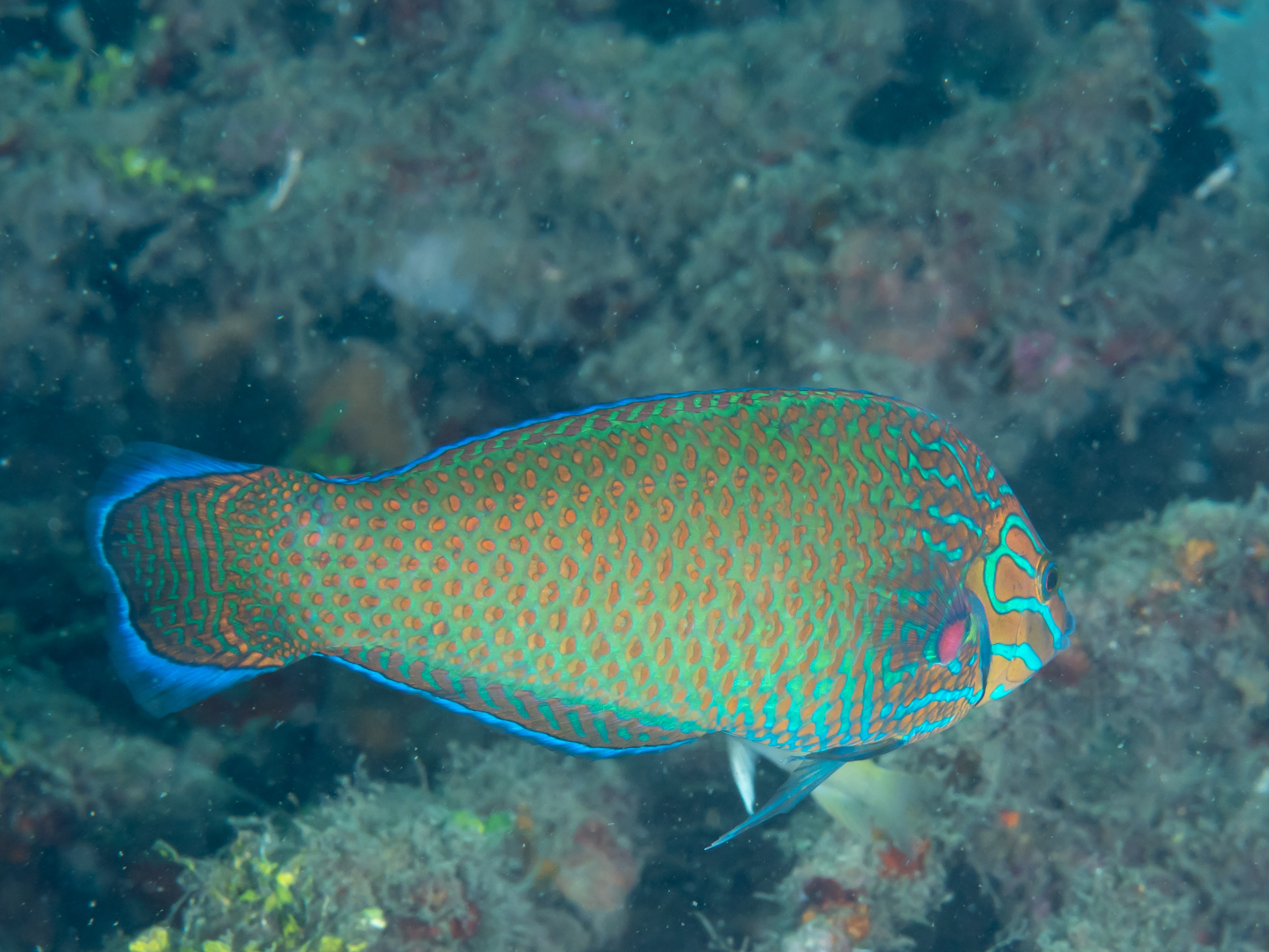

Conservation status
- Least Concern (IUCN 3.1)

Scientific classification
- Kingdom: Animalia
- Phylum: Chordata
- Class: Actinopterygii
- Order: Labriformes
- Family: Labridae
- Genus: Halichoeres
- Species: H. leucurus

Binomial name
- Halichoeres leucurus (Walbaum, 1792)

Synonyms
- Labrus leucurus Walbaum, 1792; Labrus purpurescens Bloch & Schneider, 1801; Halichoeres purpurescens (Bloch & Schneider, 1801)

= Halichoeres leucurus =

Species of fish

Halichoeres leucurus is a marine fish commonly known as greyhead wrasse, chainline wrasse, sand-reef wrasse or silty wrasse. They are harmless to humans and have a size of around 9 centimetres (3.5 in)–13 centimetres (5.1 in).

== Dispersion ==
Halichoeres leucurus lives in the Western Pacific, specifically from the Philippines to New Guinea and from the Yaeyama Islands to southern Indonesia.

== Biology ==
Halichoeres leucurus can be found in coral-rich lagoon and inner channel reefs 1–15 meters deep in mixed coral and algae habitats. These fish may be found solitary or in pairs. They feed on small benthic invertebrates like nematodes, flatworms, gastrotichs, mussels, oligochaete worms, and some amphipods.

== Description ==
H. leucurus has 9 dorsal spines, 13 Dorsal soft rays, 3 anal spines, and 13 anal soft rays. Males are recognized by the grey head when seen in natural light. The body has a lined pattern until female stage. Males have orange spots along scale rows.
