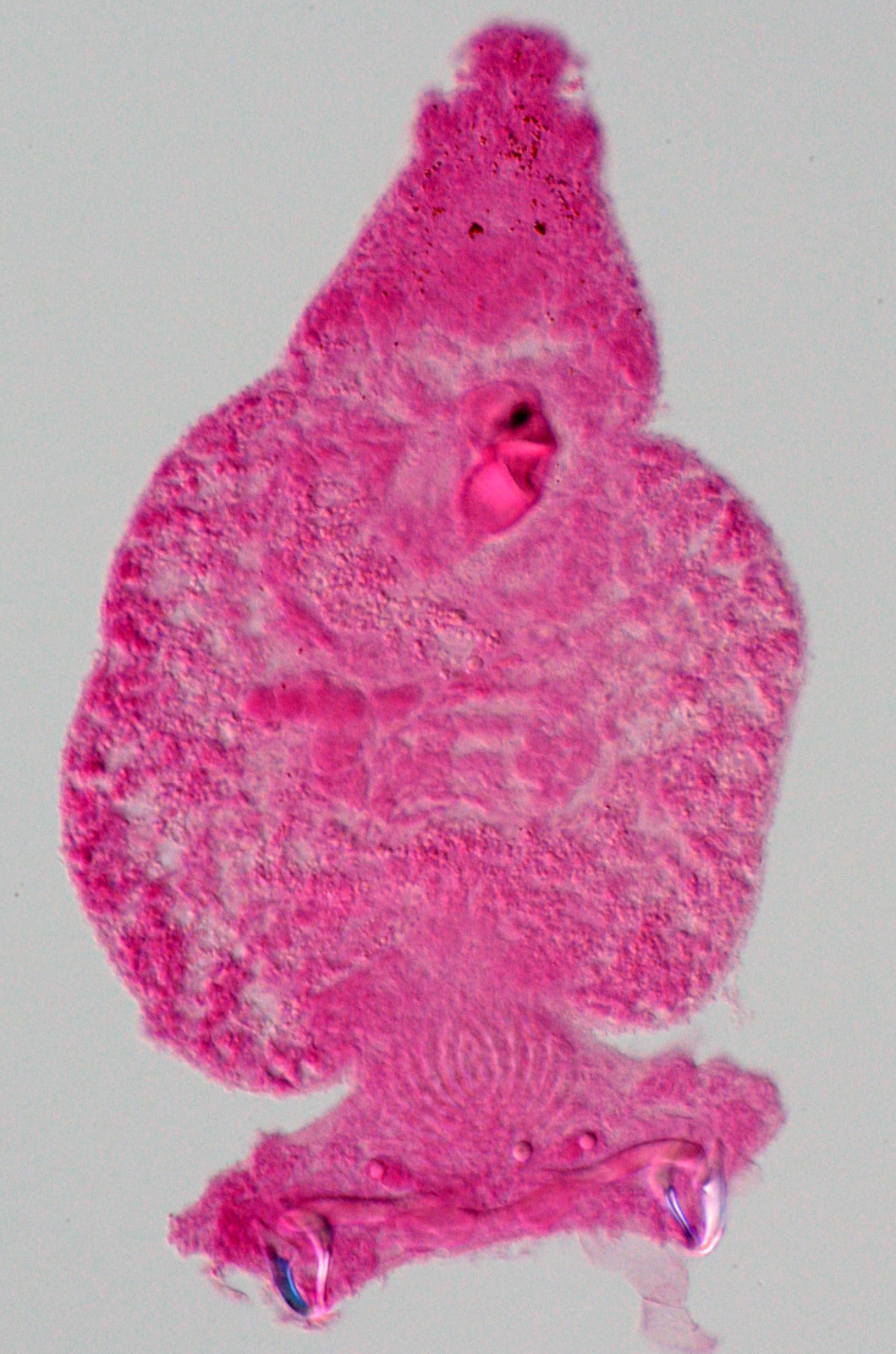
- Pseudorhabdosynochus morrhua, holotype

Scientific classification
- Kingdom: Animalia
- Phylum: Platyhelminthes
- Class: Monogenea
- Order: Dactylogyridea
- Family: Diplectanidae
- Genus: Pseudorhabdosynochus
- Species: P. morrhua

Binomial name
- Pseudorhabdosynochus morrhua Justine, 2008

= Pseudorhabdosynochus morrhua =

Species of flatworm

Pseudorhabdosynochus morrhua is a diplectanid monogenean parasitic on the gills of the grouper Epinephelus morrhua. It has been described in 2008.

== Description ==
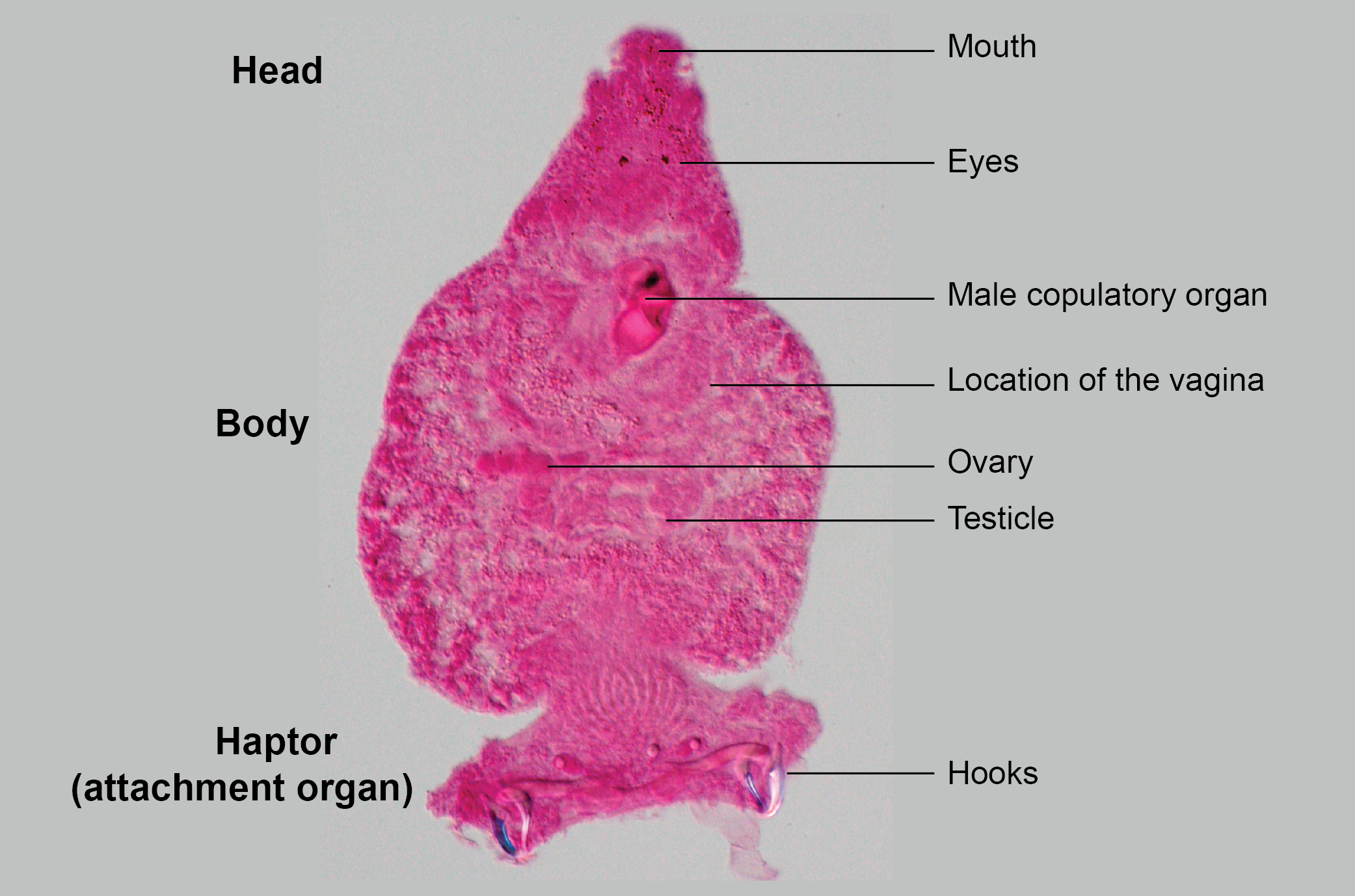
Pseudorhabdosynochus morrhua, with captions showing main parts and organs

Pseudorhabdosynochus morrhua is a small monogenean, 0.25 mm–0.48 mm in length. The species has the general characteristics of other species of Pseudorhabdosynochus, with a flat body and a posterior haptor, which is the organ by which the monogenean attaches itself to the gill of is host. The haptor bears two squamodiscs, one ventral and one dorsal. The sclerotized male copulatory organ, or "quadriloculate organ", has the shape of a bean with four internal chambers, as in other species of Pseudorhabdosynochus.

The vagina includes a sclerotized part, which is a complex structure.

== Etymology ==
The name of the parasite is from the host name, Epinephelus morrhua.

== Hosts and localities ==
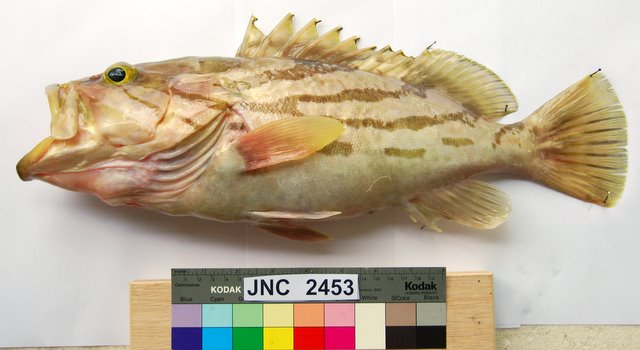
The comet grouper, Epinephelus morrhua, is the host of Pseudorhabdosynochus morrhua

The type-host and only recorded host of P. morrhua is the comet grouper Epinephelus morrhua (Serranidae: Epinephelinae). The type-locality and only recorded locality is off Nouméa, New Caledonia. This grouper also harbours another species of Pseudorhabdosynochus, P. variabilis Justine, 2008.
