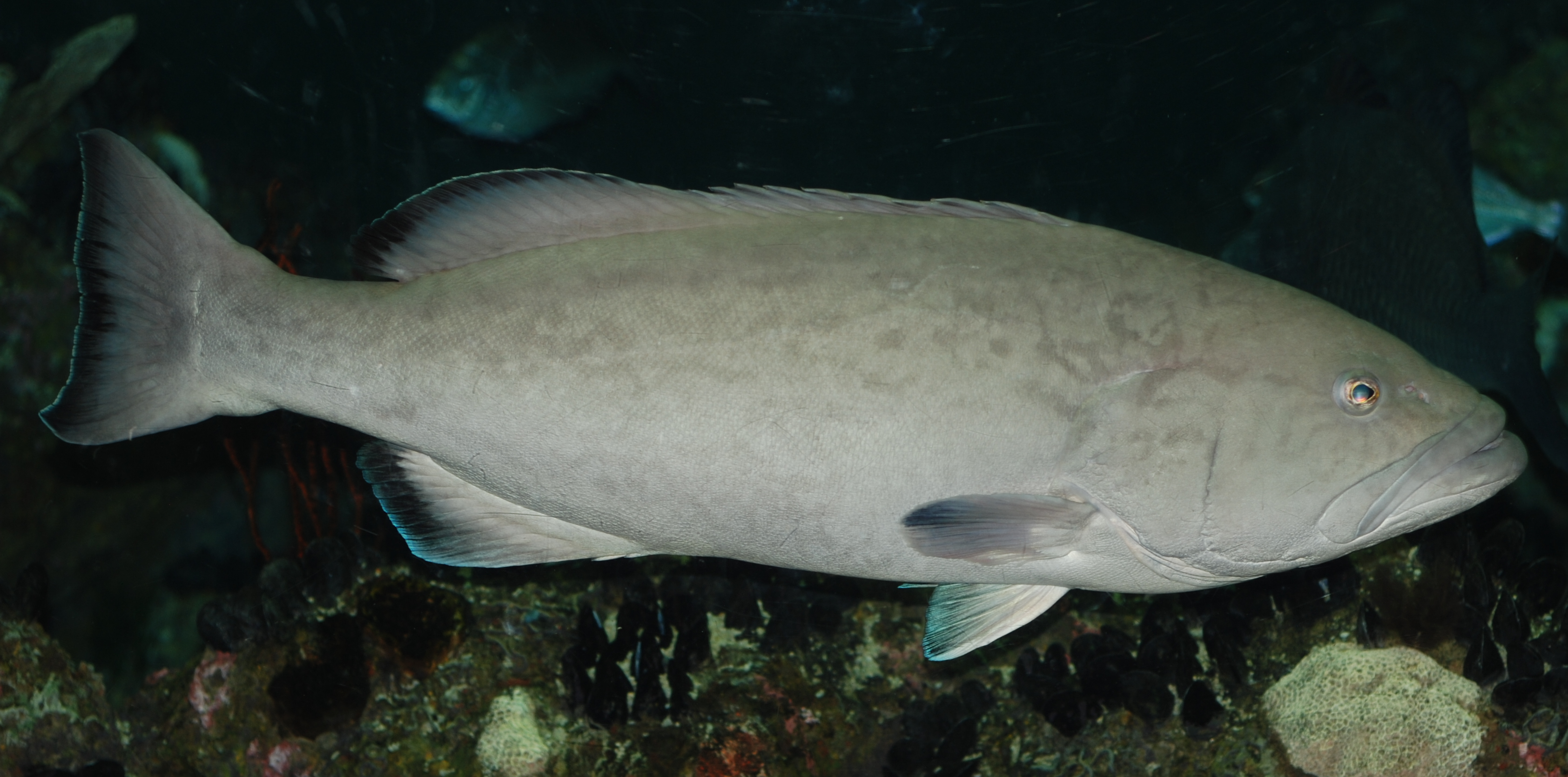
- Gag grouper, Mycteroperca microlepis

Scientific classification
- Kingdom: Animalia
- Phylum: Chordata
- Class: Actinopterygii
- Division: Teleostei
- Order: Perciformes
- Suborder: Percoidei
- Family: Epinephelidae; Bleeker, 1874

Genera
- See text

= Grouper =

Family of fishes

Groupers are a diverse group of marine ray-finned fish in the family Epinephelidae, in the order Perciformes.

Groupers were long considered a subfamily of the seabasses in Serranidae, but are now treated as distinct. Not all members of this family are called "groupers". The common name "grouper" is usually given to fish in one of two large genera: Epinephelus and Mycteroperca. In addition, the species classified in the small genera Anyperidon, Chromileptes, Dermatolepis, Graciela, Saloptia, and Triso are also called "groupers". Fish in the genus Plectropomus are referred to as "coral groupers". These genera are all classified in the subfamily Epiphelinae. However, some of the hamlets (genus Alphestes), the hinds (genus Cephalopholis), the lyretails (genus Variola), and some other small genera (Gonioplectrus, Niphon, Paranthias) are also in this subfamily, and occasional species in other serranid genera have common names involving the word "grouper". Nonetheless, the word "grouper" on its own is usually taken as meaning the family Epinephelidae.

== Description ==
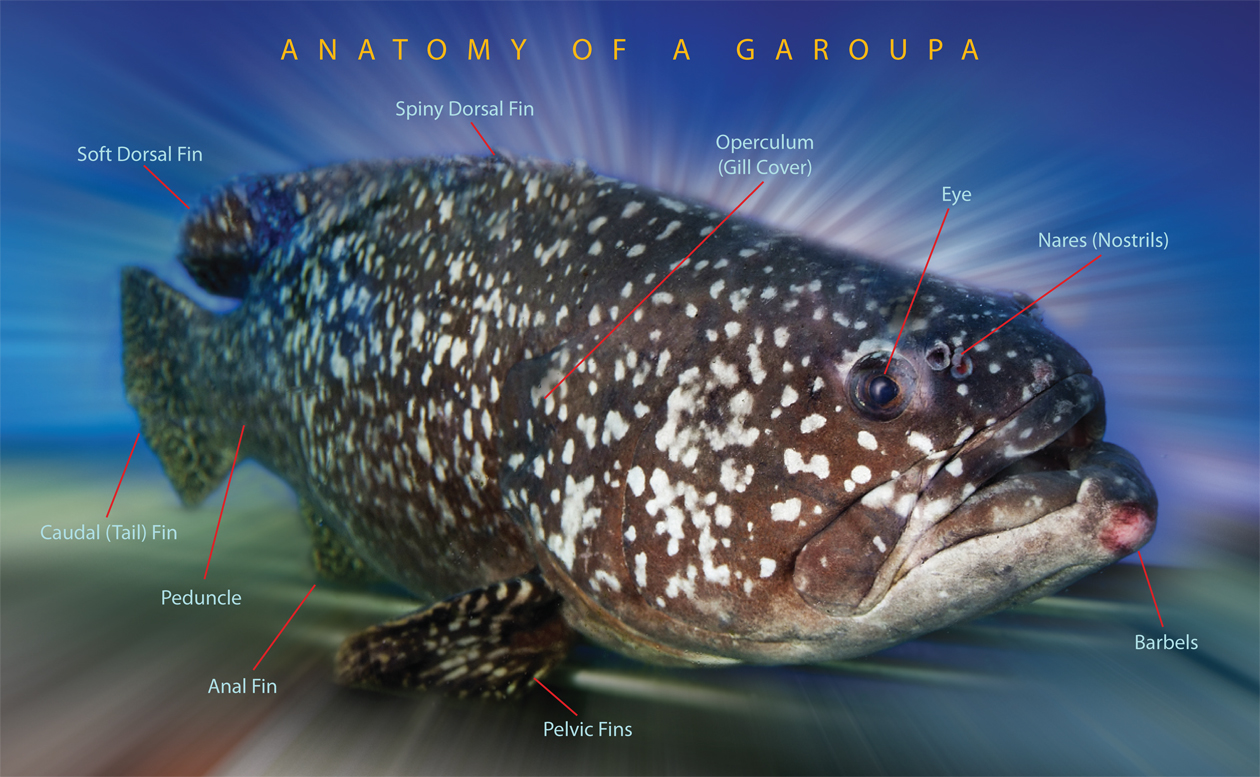
Anatomy of a giant grouper

Groupers are teleosts, typically having a stout body and a large mouth. They are not built for long-distance, fast swimming. They can be quite large: in length, over a meter. The largest is the Atlantic goliath grouper (Epinephelus itajara) which has been weighed at 399 kilograms (880 pounds) and a length of 2.43 m (7 ft 11 1/2 in), though in such a large group, species vary considerably. They swallow prey rather than biting pieces off of them. They do not have many teeth on the edges of their jaws, but they have heavy crushing tooth plates inside the pharynx. They habitually eat fish, octopuses, and crustaceans. Some species prefer to ambush their prey, while others are active predators. Reports of fatal attacks on humans by the largest species, such as the giant grouper (Epinephelus lanceolatus), are unconfirmed.

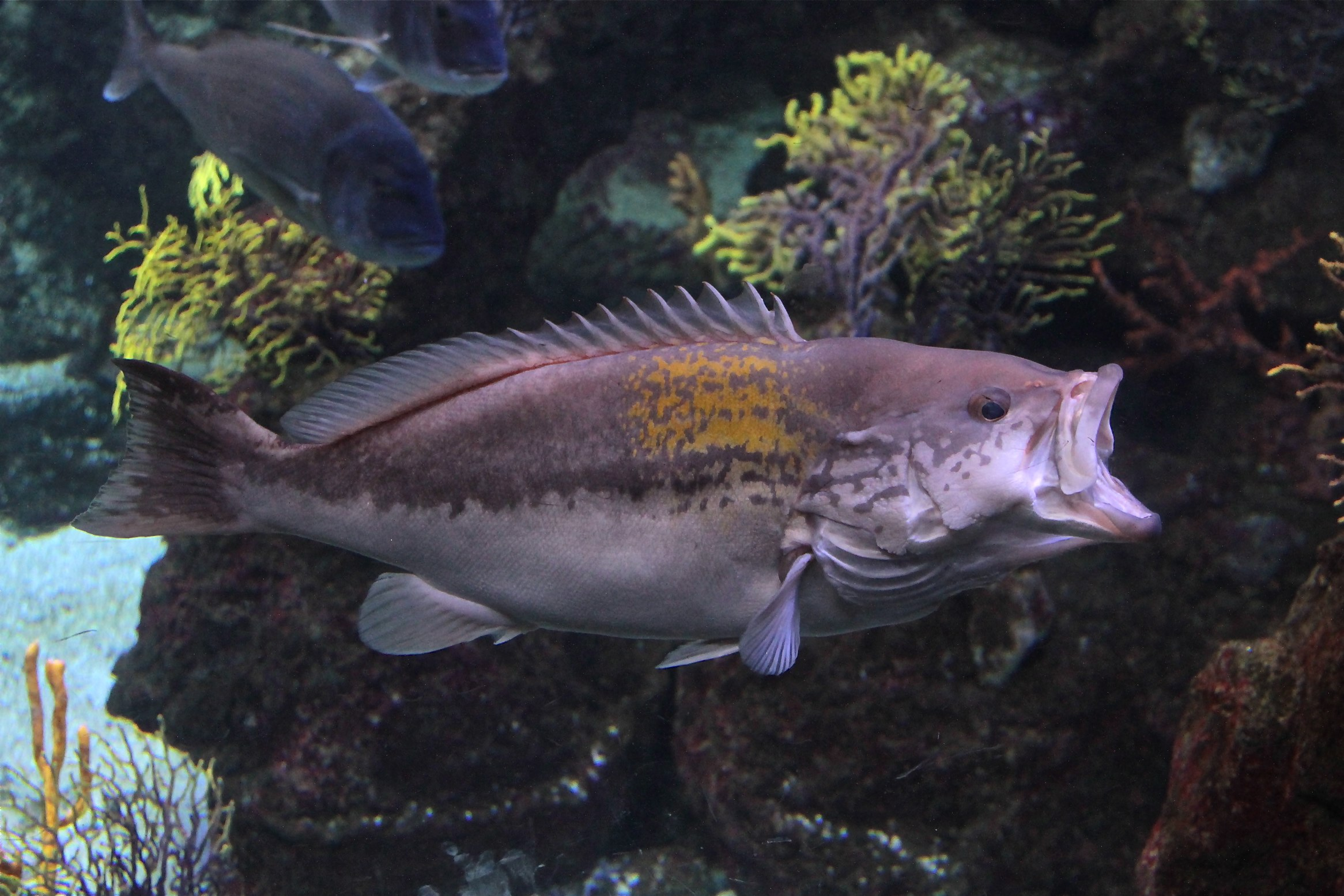
Gold-blotch grouper opening its jaws

Their mouths and gills form a powerful vacuum that pulls their prey in from a distance. They also use their mouths to dig into sand to form their shelters under big rocks, jetting it out through their gills.

Research indicates roving coralgroupers (Plectropomus pessuliferus) sometimes cooperate with giant morays in hunting. Groupers are also one of the only animals that eat invasive red lionfish.

Most grouper species are demersal. However, Triso dermopterus, Paranthias (P. colonus and P. furcifer), and juvenile Gracila albomarginatus are semi-pelagic.

== Systematics ==
=== Etymology ===
The word "grouper" is from the Portuguese name, garoupa, which has been speculated to come from an indigenous South American language. The family name Epinephelidae comes from the type genus Epinephelus, which means "clouded over" in ancient Greek, referencing the cloudy membrane covering the eyes of most groupers that would have been known to European scientists at the time of description.

In Australia, "groper" is used instead of "grouper" for several species, such as the Queensland grouper (Epinephelus lanceolatus). In New Zealand, "groper" refers to a type of wreckfish, Polyprion oxygeneios, which goes by the name hapuka (from the Māori language hāpuku). In the Philippines, groupers are generally known as lapu-lapu in Luzon, while in the Visayas and Mindanao, they are known as pugapo. They are known as kerapu in both Indonesian and Malay. In the Middle East, the fish are known as hammour, and are widely eaten, especially in the Persian Gulf region. In Latin America, the fish is known as mero.

In previous taxonomic treatments, the soapfishes of the Grammistini and Diploprionini were treated as tribes within the subfamily Epinephelinae. However, Eschmeyer's Catalog of Fishes presently treats these as distinct families.

=== Classification ===
Based on Eschmeyer's Catalog of Fishes:

- Family Epinephelidae Bleeker, 1874 (groupers)
  - Aethaloperca Fowler, 1904
  - Alphestes Bloch & Schneider, 1801
  - Anyperodon Günther, 1859
  - Cephalopholis Bloch & Schneider, 1801
  - Chromileptes Swainson, 1839
  - Dermatolepis Gill, 1861
  - Epinephelus Bloch, 1793
  - Gonioplectrus Gill, 1862
  - Gracila Randall, 1964
  - Hyporthodus Gill, 1861
  - Mycteroperca Gill, 1862
  - Paranthias Guichenot, 1868
  - Plectropomus Pken, 1817
  - Saloptia J. L. B. Smith, 1964
  - Triso Randall, Johnson & Lowe, 1989
  - Variola Swainson, 1839

== Reproduction ==
Groupers are mostly monandric, protogynous hermaphrodites, i.e., they mature only as females and can change sex after sexual maturity. Some species of groupers grow about a kilogram per year and are generally adolescents until they reach 3 kg (6.6 lb) when they become female. The largest males often control harems containing up to 15 females. Groupers often pair spawn, which enables large males to competitively exclude smaller males from reproducing. As such, if a small female grouper were to change sex before it could control a harem as a male, its fitness would decrease. If no male is available, the largest female that can increase fitness by changing sex will do so.

However, some groupers are gonochoristic. Gonochorism, or a reproductive strategy with two distinct sexes, has evolved independently in groupers at least five times. The evolution of gonochorism is linked to group spawning high amounts of habitat cover. Both group spawning and habitat cover increase the likelihood of a smaller male reproducing in the presence of large males. The fitness of male groupers in environments where competitive exclusion of smaller males is impossible is correlated with sperm production and thus testicle size. Gonochoristic groupers have larger testes than protogynous groupers (10% of body mass compared to 1% of body mass), indicating the evolution of gonochorism increased male grouper fitness in environments where large males were unable to competitively exclude small males from reproducing.

== Parasites ==
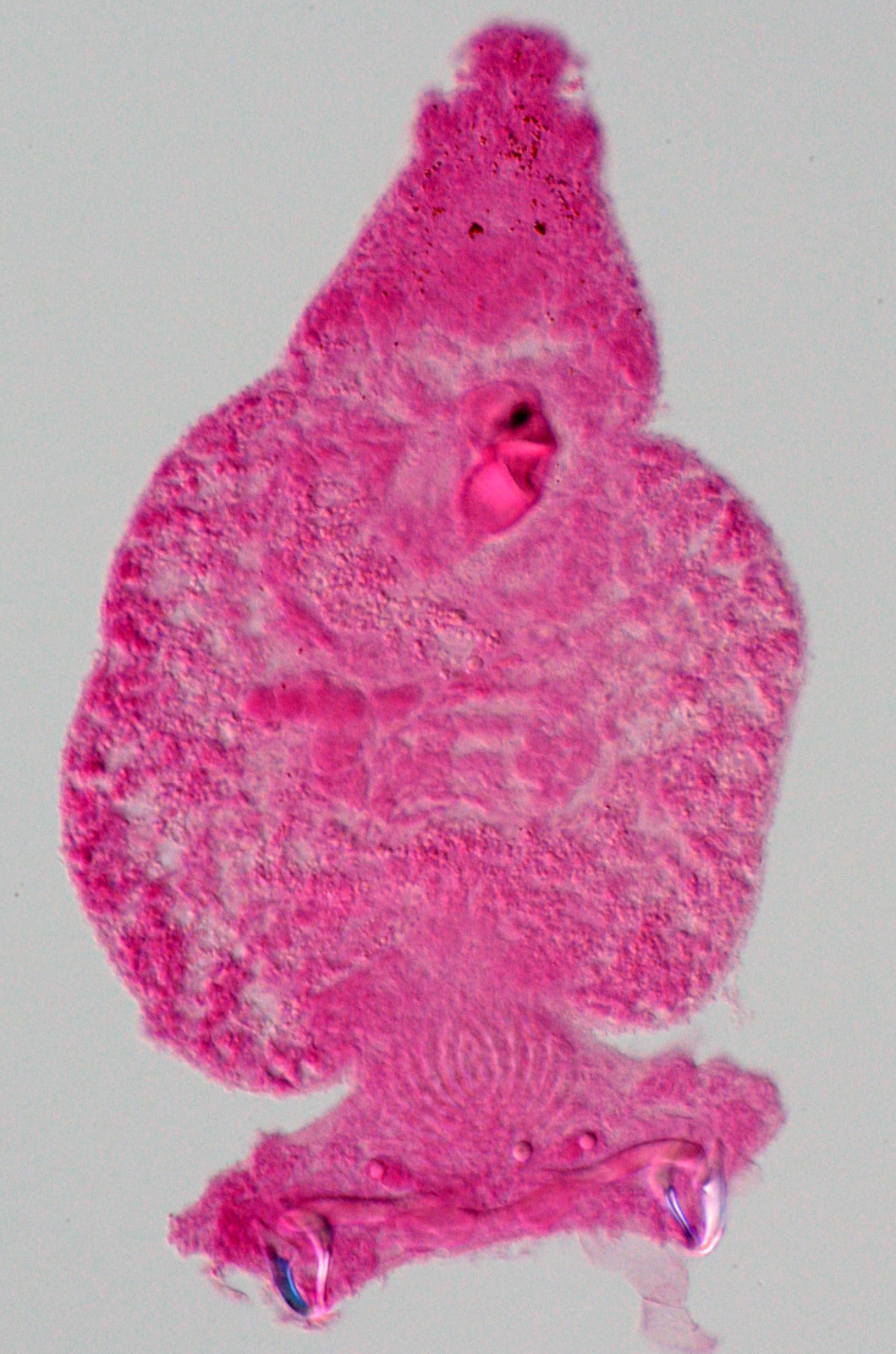
Pseudorhabdosynochus morrhua, a monogenean parasite of the gills of comet groupers

Like other fish, groupers harbor parasites, including digeneans, nematodes, cestodes, monogeneans, isopods, and copepods. A study conducted in New Caledonia has shown that coral reef-associated groupers have about 10 species of parasites per fish species. Species of Pseudorhabdosynochus, monogeneans of the family Diplectanidae are typical of and especially numerous on groupers.

== Modern use ==
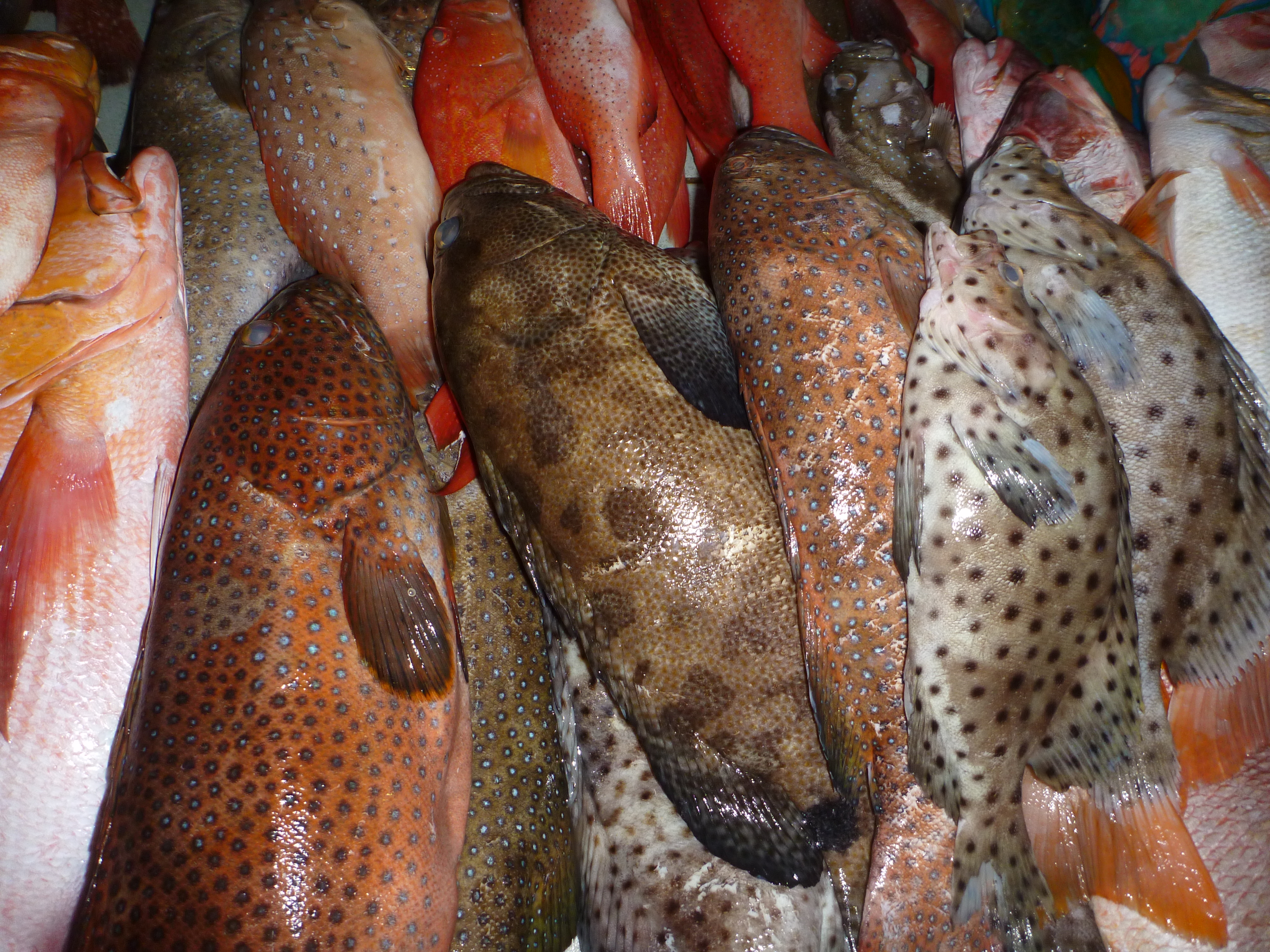
Several grouper species at a fish market, in Malaysia

Many groupers are important food fish; some are now farmed. Unlike most other fish species, which are chilled or frozen, groupers are usually sold alive in markets. Many species are popular game fish for big-game fishing. Some species are small enough to be kept in aquaria, though even the small species are inclined to grow rapidly.

Groupers are commonly reported as a source of ciguatera fish poisoning. DNA barcoding of grouper species might help control ciguatera fish poisoning, since fish are easily identified, even from meal remnants, with molecular tools.

== Size ==
Malaysian newspaper The Star reported a 180 kg (400 lb) grouper being caught off the waters near Pulau Sembilan in the Strait of Malacca in January 2008. Shenzhen News in China reported that a 1.8 m (6 ft) grouper swallowed a 1.0 m (3 ft 3 in) whitetip reef shark at the Fuzhou Sea World aquarium.

In September 2010, a Costa Rican newspaper reported a 2.3 m (7 ft 7 in) grouper in Cieneguita, Limón. The weight of the fish was 250 kg (550 lb), and it was lured using 1 kg of bait. In November 2013, a 310 kg (680 lb) grouper had been caught and sold to a hotel in Dongyuan, China.

In August 2014, off Bonita Springs in Florida (US), a big grouper took in one gulp a 4-foot shark that an angler had caught.

== See also ==
- Dusky grouper
