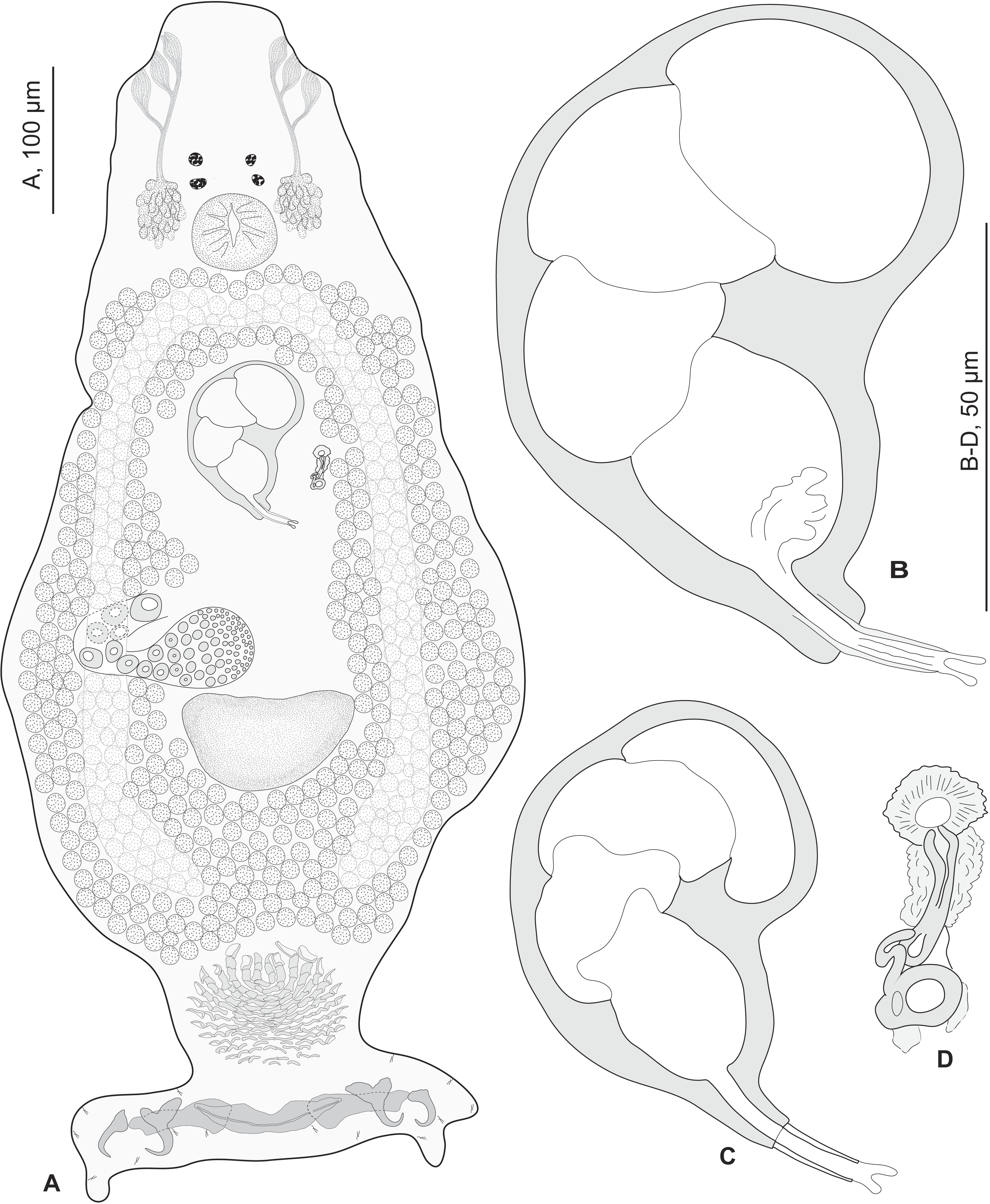
- Body and sclerotised parts

Scientific classification
- Kingdom: Animalia
- Phylum: Platyhelminthes
- Class: Monogenea
- Order: Dactylogyridea
- Family: Diplectanidae
- Genus: Pseudorhabdosynochus
- Species: P. sulamericanus

Binomial name
- Pseudorhabdosynochus sulamericanus Santos, Buchmann & Gibson, 2000

= Pseudorhabdosynochus sulamericanus =

Species of flatworm

Pseudorhabdosynochus sulamericanus is a diplectanid monogenean parasitic on the gills of the snowy grouper, Epinephelus niveatus, the Warsaw grouper, Epinephelus nigritus and the Haifa grouper, Epinephelus haifensis. It has been described by Santos, Buchmann & Gibson in 2000, redescribed by Kritsky, Bakenhaster and Adams in 2015. and again redescribed by Chaabane, Justine, Gey, Bakenhaster & Neifar in 2016.

== Description ==
Pseudorhabdosynochus sulamericanus is a small monogenean. The species has the general characteristics of other species of Pseudorhabdosynochus, with a flat body and a posterior haptor, which is the organ by which the monogenean attaches itself to the gill of is host. The haptor bears two squamodiscs, one ventral and one dorsal. The sclerotized male copulatory organ, or "quadriloculate organ", has the shape of a bean with four internal chambers, as in other species of Pseudorhabdosynochus. The vagina includes a sclerotized part, which is a complex structure.

The description by Kritsky, Bakenhaster & Adams in 2015 includes the following: Body dorsoventrally flattened. Tegumental scales with rounded anterior margins extending from peduncle anteriorly into posterior trunk. Cephalic region broad, with terminal and two bilateral poorly developed lobes, three bilateral pairs of head organs, pair of bilateral groups of cephalic-gland cells at level of pharynx. Two pairs of eyespots lacking lenses immediately anterior to pharynx; one to all eyespots poorly defined, apparently replaced by dissociated chromatic granules; accessory chromatic granules small, irregular in outline, usually present in cephalic region. Pharynx subspherical to subovate; esophagus short to nonexistent; intestinal ceca blind, extending posteriorly to near peduncle. Peduncle broad. Haptor with dorsal and ventral anteromedial lobes containing respective squamodiscs and lateral lobes having hook pairs 2–4, 6, 7. Squamodiscs subequal, with 14–17 (usually 15) U-shaped rows of rodlets; innermost row teardrop shaped, closed. Ventral anchor with short superficial root, longer deep root having lateral swelling, slightly curved shaft, and recurved point extending just past level of tip of superficial root. Dorsal anchor with subtriangular base, superficial root short to lacking, short deep root, slightly arcing shaft, recurved point extending past level of tip of superficial root. Ventral bar with medial constriction, tapered ends, longitudinal medioventral groove. Paired dorsal bar with spatulate medial end. Hook with long slightly depressed thumb, delicate point, uniform shank; FH loop nearly shank length. Testis ovate, lying sinistroposterior to germarium along body midline; proximal vas deferens not observed; seminal vesicle a simple dilation of distal vas deferens, lying posterior to male copulatory organ; ejaculatory bulb and duct not observed; large vesicle (prostatic reservoir?) lying dextral to distal chamber of male copulatory organ. Male copulatory organquadriloculate, with thick walls, short distal cone, elongate tube, protruding filament variable in length. Germarium pyriform; germarial bulb lying diagonally at body midlength, with dorsoventral distal loop around right intestinal cecum; ootype lying to left of body midline, with well-developed Mehlis' gland; uterus delicate, banana shaped when empty. Common genital pore ventral, dextral to MCO. Vaginal pore sinistroventral at level of distal end of male copulatory organ; vaginal vestibule delicate; vaginal sclerite complex, with distal flare, irregular tube with small proximal bulge and surrounded by variable small sclerites, and small chamber giving rise to delicate vaginal canal. Seminal receptacle subspherical, immediately proximal to vagina and anterior to ootype. Bilateral vitelline ducts not observed; vitellarium absent in regions of other reproductive organs, otherwise dense throughout trunk.

== Diagnosis ==
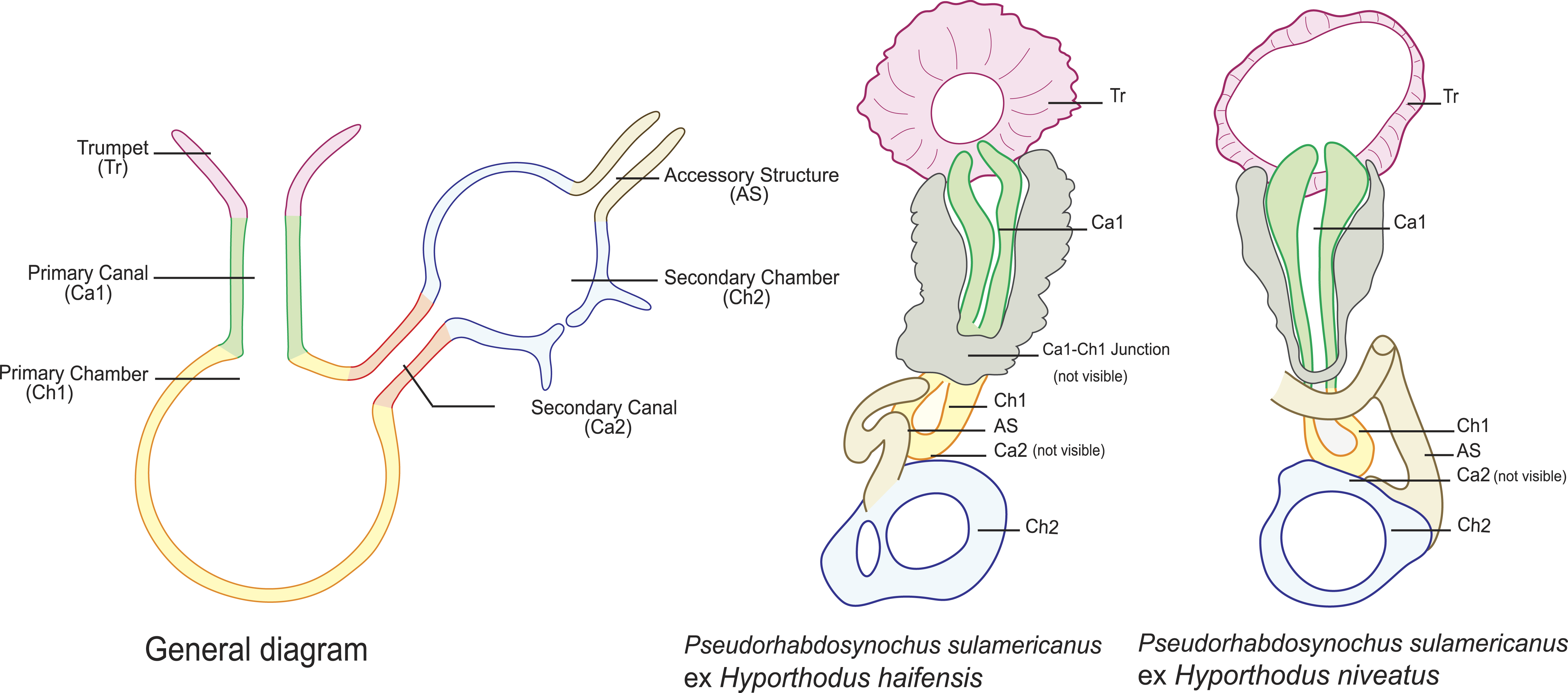
Comparison of the structure of the vagina of Pseudorhabdosynochus sulamericanus between specimens from both sides of the Atlantic

According to Kritsky, Bakenhaster and Adams (2015), P. sulamericanus is most similar to P. firmicoleatus based on comparative morphology of the vaginal sclerite, male copulatory organ, and haptoral elements. The vaginal sclerite of both species has a comparatively small basal chamber and a small secondary bulge of the tube that flares at its union with the vaginal vestibule. The sclerite of P. sulamericanus, however, differs from that of P. firmicoleatus by having a slightly larger chamber and irregular sclerites associated with the distal tube.

Chaabane et al. redescribed the sclerotized vagina as consisting of slightly sclerotised funnel-shaped trumpet, followed by a short primary canal with thick wall. Its primary canal is surrounded by additional sclerotised material in its proximal part, which obscures internal relationships. The posterior end of primary canal is directed to primary chamber and the junction between the two structures is visible (in specimens from H. niveatus) or not (in specimens from H. haifensis). The primary chamber is small, pear-shaped. The secondary canal (junction between primary chamber and secondary chamber) was not seen. The secondary chamber is spherical and heavily sclerotised. The accessory structure has an internal canal and is looping twice and inserted on the secondary chamber.

== Hosts and localities ==
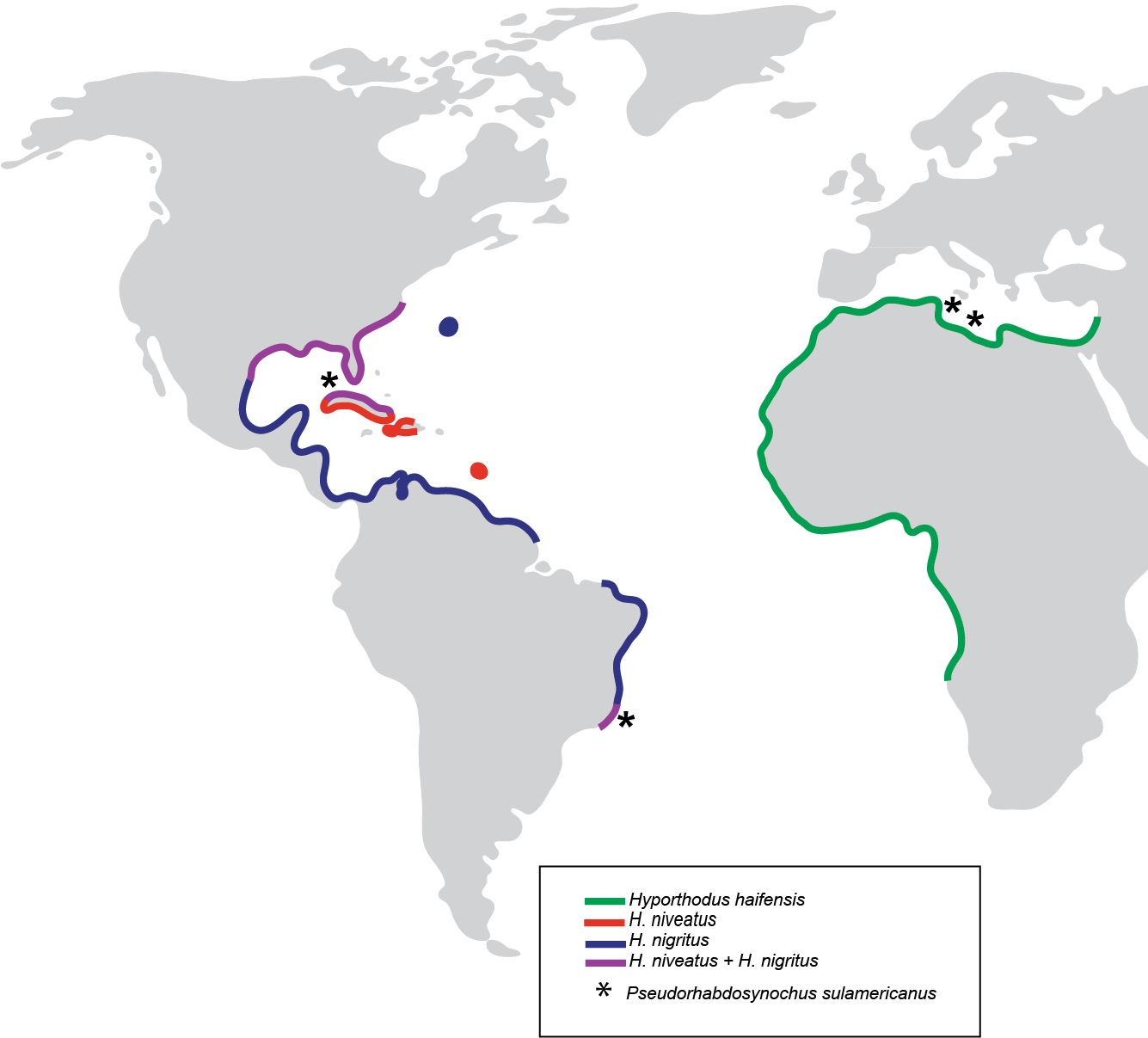
Distribution of Pseudorhabdosynochus sulamericanus (asterisks) on both sides of the Atlantic Ocean

=== Type-host and other hosts in the Western Atlantic ===
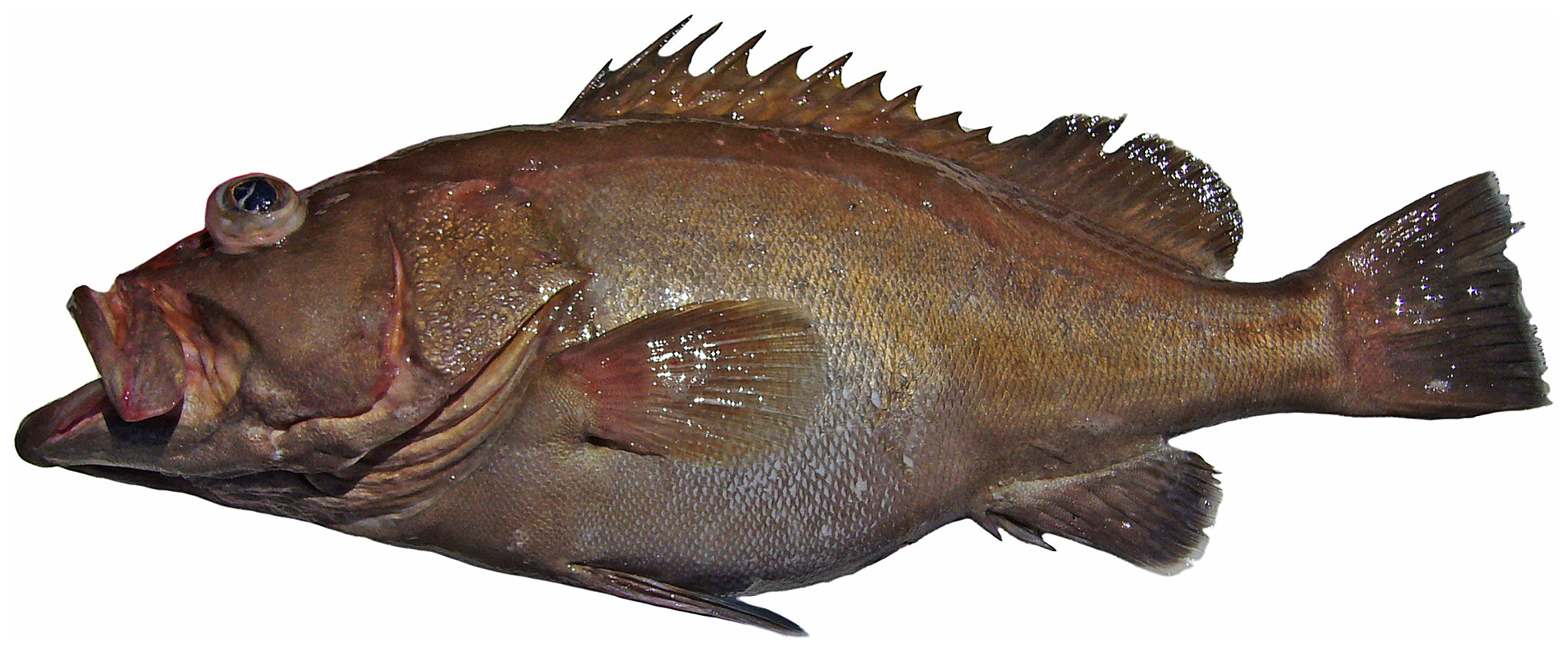
The snowy grouper, Epinephelus niveatus is the type-host of Pseudorhabdosynochus sulamericanus

The type-host of P. sulamericanus is the snowy grouper, Epinephelus niveatus (or Hyporthodus niveatus) (Serranidae: Epinephelinae). The type-locality if off Ilhas Cagarras, Rio de Janeiro, Brazil. The species has also been recorded in the same host from off Cape Canaveral, Florida, and off Pensacola, Florida. It has also been recorded from another host, the Warsaw grouper, Epinephelus nigritus (or Hyporthodus niveatus), off Naples, Florida.

=== A transatlantic Monogenean ===
In 2016, Chaabane et al. examined specimens of Haifa grouper, Hyporthodus haifensis, from off Tunisia and Libya. They found specimens of monogeneans belonging to the genus Pseudorhabdosynochus, and conducted a morphological comparison between newly collected specimens and those previously deposited in museum collections by other authors. Finally, they considered their specimens to be cospecific with Pseudorhabdosynochus sulamericanus. They wrote "Our observation that P. sulamericanus infects unrelated host species with putatively allopatric distributions was unexpected given the very limited dispersive capabilities and the high degree of host specificity common to members of Pseudorhabdosynochus. This transatlantic distribution raises questions with regard to phylogeography and assumptions about the allopatry of Atlantic grouper species from the Americas and Afro-Eurasia."

== Gallery ==
P. sulamericanus from Hyporthodus niveatus

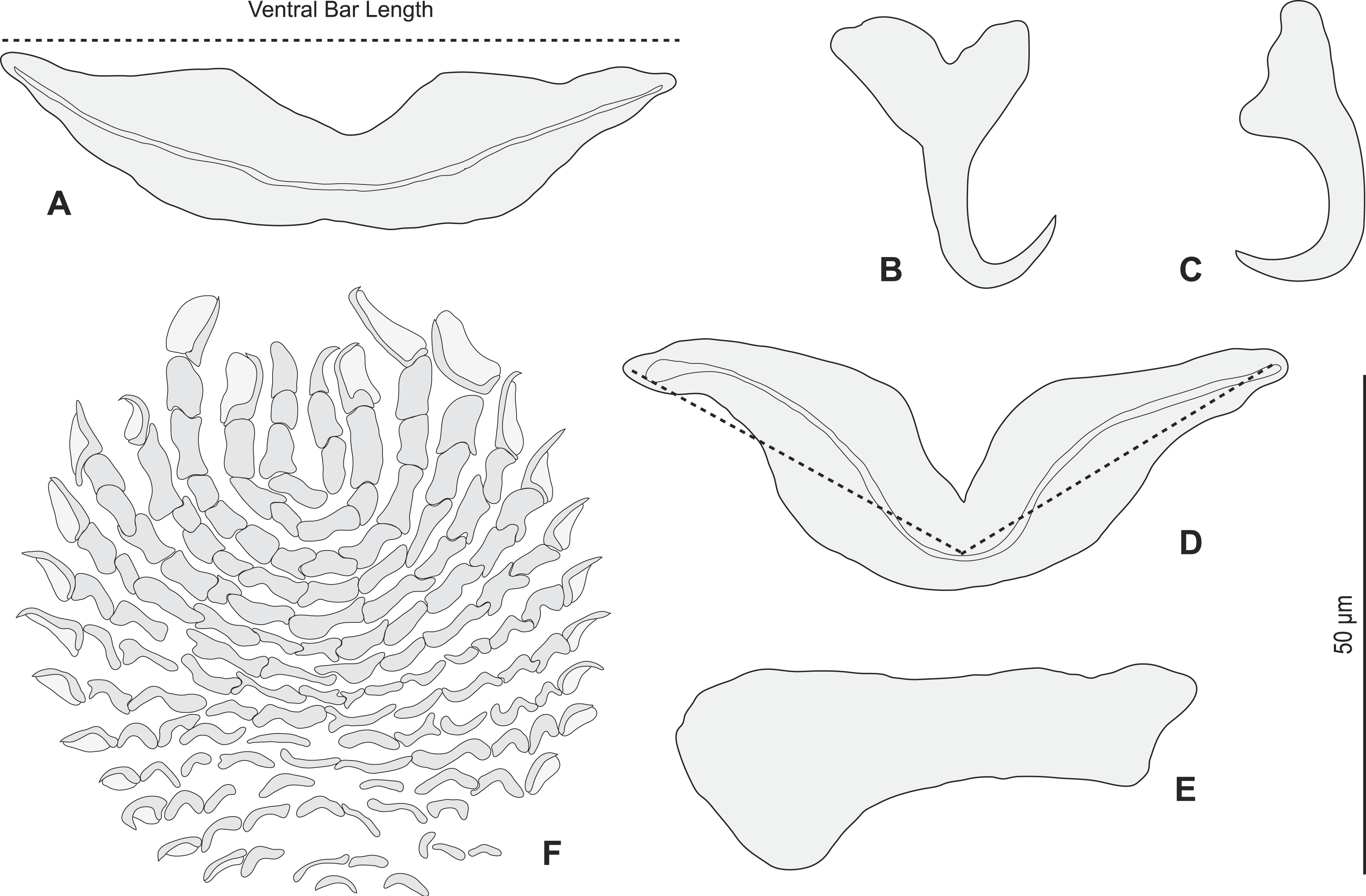
P. sulamericanus from Hyporthodus haifensis

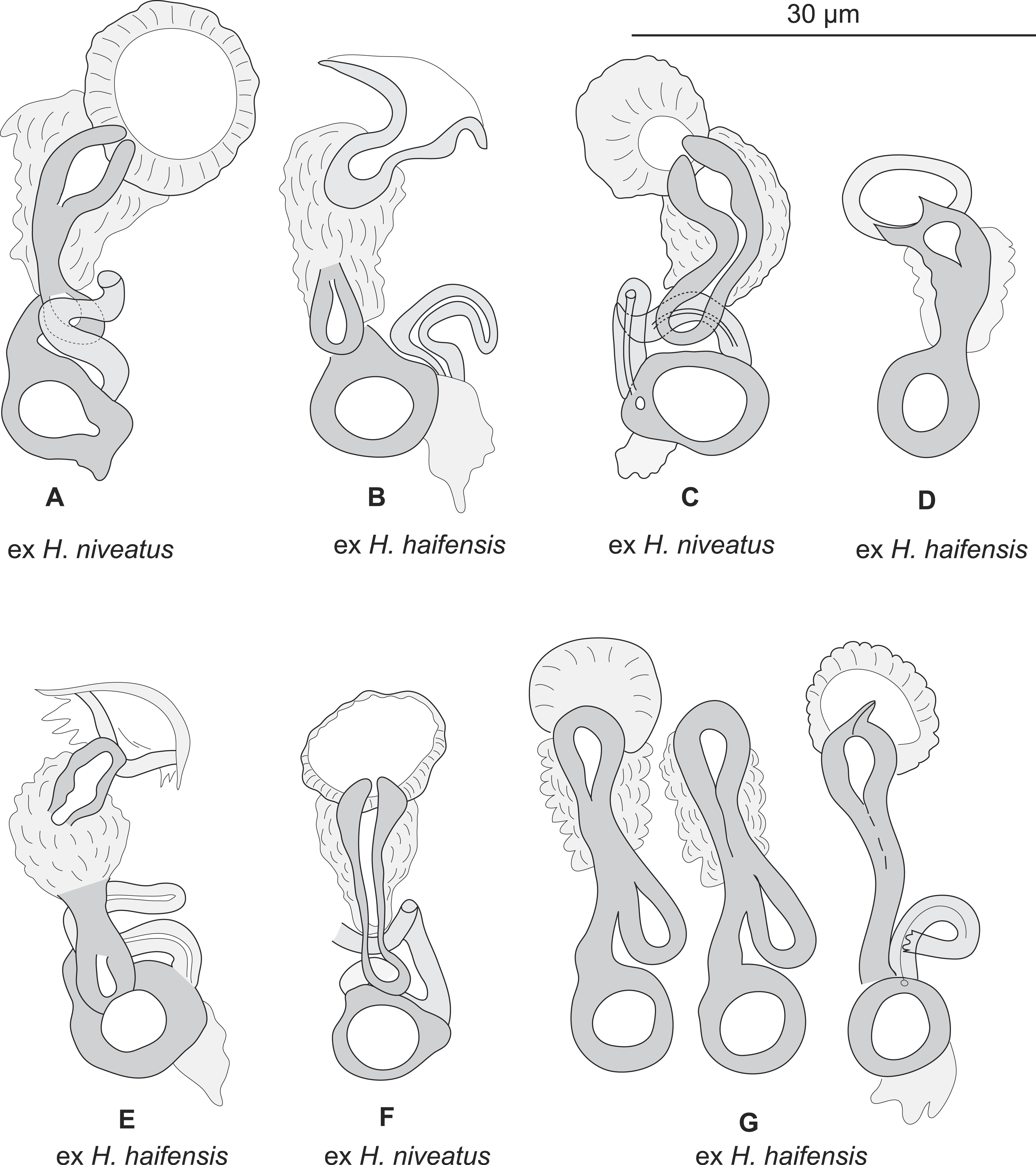
Comparison of vaginae

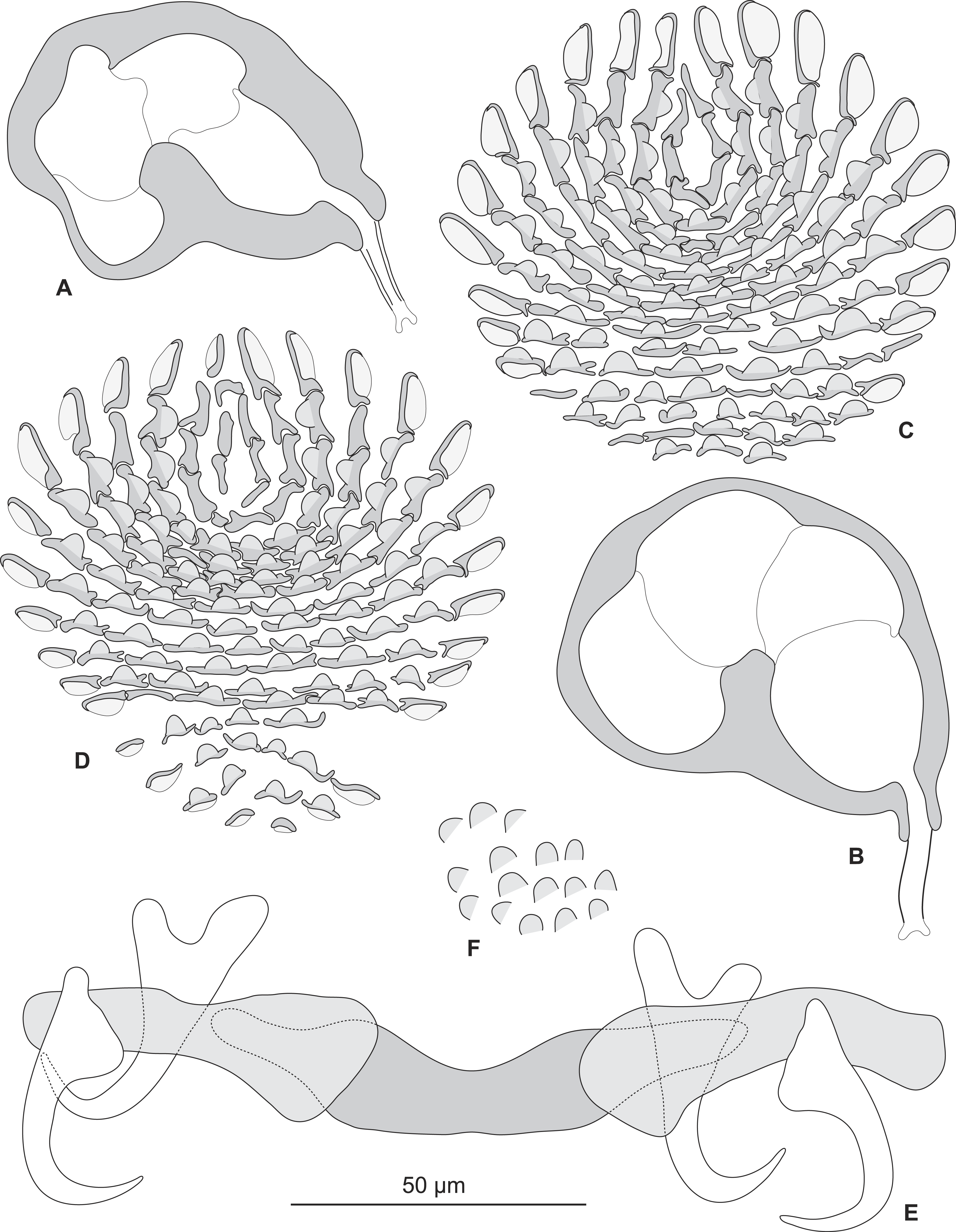
P. sulamericanus from Hyporthodus niveatus
