= Wildlife of North Carolina =

Flora and fauna of the US state of North Carolina

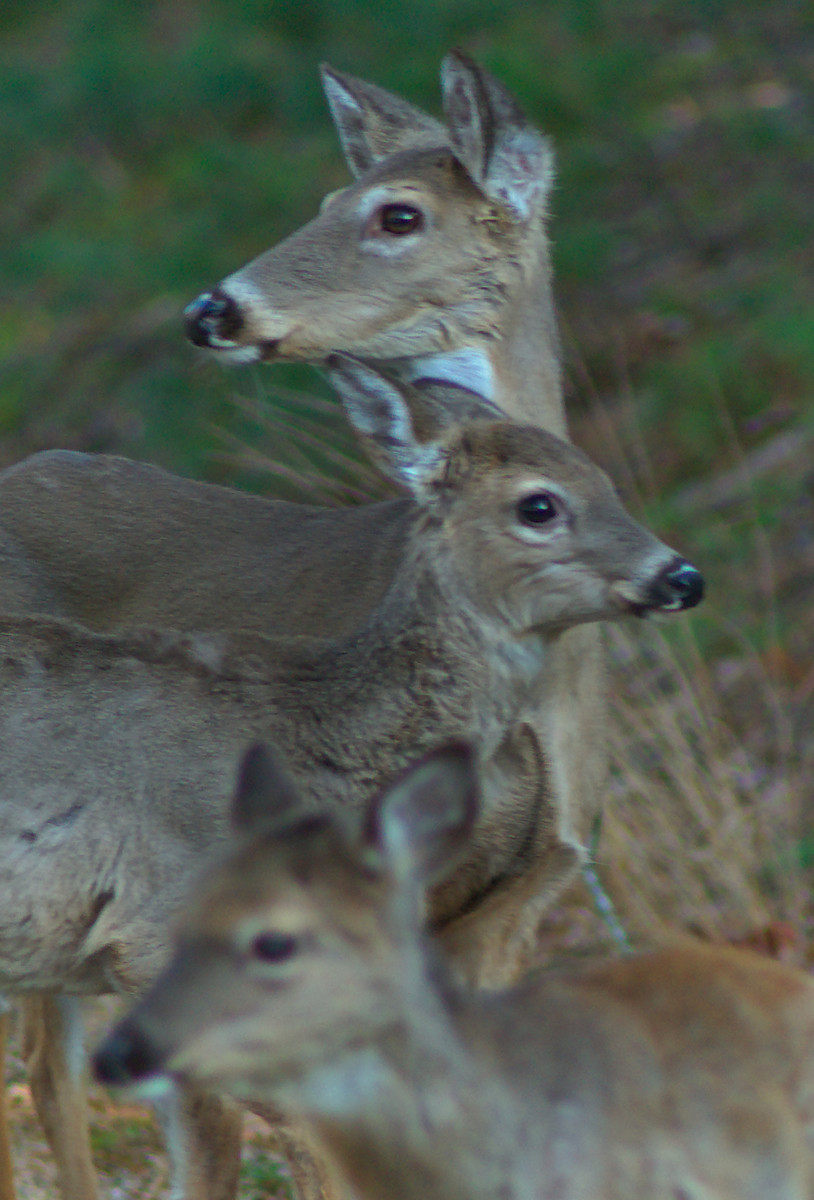
Deer feeding at roadside; doe with fawns

This article seeks to serve as a field-guide, central repository, and listing for the flora and fauna of the US state of North Carolina and surrounding territories.

== State ecology ==
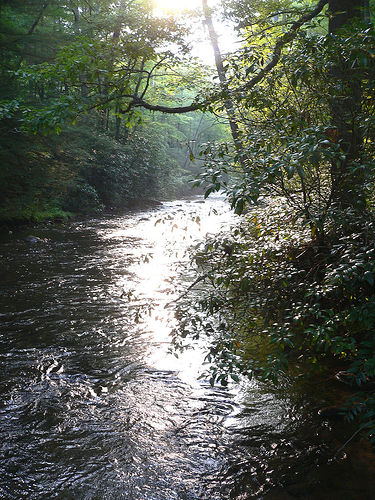
The North Mills River in North Carolina

North Carolina's geography is usually divided into three biomes: Coastal, Piedmont, and the Appalachian Mountains.

North Carolina is the most ecologically unique state in the southeast because its borders contain sub-tropical, temperate, and boreal habitats. Although the state is at temperate latitudes, the Appalachian Mountains and the Gulf Stream influence climate and, hence, the vegetation (flora) and animals (fauna).

=== Coastal region ===
Located in eastern North Carolina, the costal region is the largest of the three regions. It has a warm and moist climate, not too different from the piedmont region. For the most part, the coastal region is flat. The topography is mostly flat, with the exception of raised areas caused by rivers and waves pushing back shorelines. Water is a key for the survival of natural communities in the costal region. The varying levels of saltiness and amount of water in different areas of the region create many different natural communities in the region. The Coastal Region can be split into two smaller areas. First, the flat and swampy part of the coast, known as the Lower Coast Plain. Then, there is the central area of the coast with greater elevations, which is called the Upper Coast Plain. Some species found in the coastal region include the red-cockaded woodpecker, roseate tern, West Indian manatee, green sea turtle, and Kemp's ridley sea turtle.

=== Piedmont ===
This region includes the Charlotte metropolitan area and urban biomes of Raleigh and Durham, as well as a large area of semi-mountainous, rolling hills. The climate is humid subtropical and the geography is rolling, gentle hills and flat valleys. The Piedmont ranges from about 300–400 feet (90–120 m) elevation in the east to over 1,000 feet (300 m) in the west. This area gets consistent rainfall throughout the year, and compared to other regions it has a diverse population of rock types. The abundance of streams, fields, and rocks allow a high concentration of amphibians, reptiles and birds to reside in the piedmont region. Some species found in the costal region include, dwarf wedgemussel, red-cockaded woodpecker, and the gray bat.

=== Mountains ===
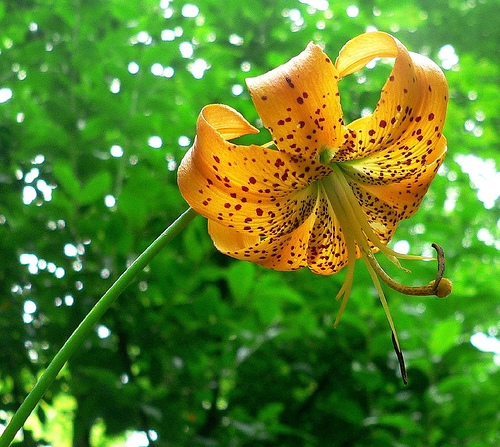
Turk's cap lily in mountainous western North Carolina

The North Carolina mountains are the smallest region, and they are located in the western part of the state. The mountainous region has a humid continental climate and the elevation in the Appalachian Mountains with range between 1500 and more than 6000 feet. Due higher elevations, the North Carolina mountains have a cooler climate and experience more rainfall than other regions in the state. The variety of ecosystems in the mountains promote biodiversity and provide habitats for many different species. Some species fount in the Mountain region include the, dwarf wedgemussel, spruce-fir moss spider, Carolina northern flying squirrel, and the Virginia big-eared bat.

== Animal life ==
=== Mammals ===
E = Endangered

Opossums:

- Virginia opossum, Didelphis virginiana

Armadillos:

- Nine-banded armadillo, Dasypus novemcinctus

Rodents:

- North American beaver, Castor canadensis reintroduced
- Northern flying squirrel, Glaucomys sabrinus (Carolina northern flying squirrel, G. s. coloratus E)
- Southern flying squirrel, Glaucomys volans
- Groundhog, Marmota monax
- Rock vole, Microtus chrotorrhinus
- Meadow vole, Microtus pennsylvanicus
- Woodland vole, Microtus pinetorum
- Southern red-backed vole Myodes gapperi
- Woodland jumping mouse Napaeozapus insignis
- Eastern woodrat, Neotoma floridana
- Golden mouse Ochrotomys nuttalli
- Muskrat, Ondatra zibethicus
- Marsh rice rat, Oryzomys palustris
- Cotton mouse, Peromyscus gossypinus
- White-footed mouse, Peromyscus leucopus
- Eastern deermouse, Peromyscus maniculatus
- Oldfield mouse, Peromyscus polionotus
- Eastern harvest mouse, Reithrodontomys humulis
- Eastern gray squirrel, Sciurus carolinensis (state mammal)
- Fox squirrel, Sciurus niger
- Hispid cotton rat Sigmodon hispidus
- Southern bog lemming, Synaptomys cooperi
- Eastern chipmunk, Tamias striatus
- American red squirrel, Tamiasciurus hudsonicus

Lagomorphs:

- Snowshoe hare, Lepus americanus extirpated
- Swamp rabbit, Sylvilagus aquaticus
- Eastern cottontail, Sylvilagus floridanus
- Appalachian cottontail, Sylvilagus obscurus
- Marsh rabbit, Sylvilagus palustris

Eulipotyphlans:

- Star-nosed mole, Condylura cristata
- Eastern mole, Scalopus aquaticus
- Northern short-tailed shrew, Blarina brevicauda
- Southeastern shrew, Sorex longirostris

Bats:

- Townsend's big-eared bat, Corynorhinus townsendii (Virginia big-eared bat, C. t. virginianus E)
- Northern yellow bat Dasypterus intermedius
- Big brown bat, Eptesicus fuscus
- Eastern red bat Lasiurus borealis
- Hoary bat Lasiurus cinereus
- Seminole bat Lasiurus seminolus
- Gray bat, Myotis grisescens E
- Eastern small-footed bat Myotis leibii E
- Northern myotis, Myotis septentrionalis
- Indiana bat, Myotis sodalis E

Carnivorans:

- Coyote, Canis latrans
- Red wolf, Canis rufus E reintroduced
- North American river otter, Lontra canadensis
- Bobcat, Lynx rufus
- Striped skunk, Mephitis mephitis
- Eastern spotted skunk, Spilogale putorius
- Least weasel, Mustela nivalis
- Long-tailed weasel, Neogale frenata
- American mink, Neogale vison
- Fisher, Pekania pennanti extirpated
- Raccoon, Procyon lotor
- Cougar, Puma concolor extirpated
  - Eastern cougar, P. c. couguar EX
- Gray fox, Urocyon cinereoargenteus
- American black bear, Ursus americanus
- Red fox, Vulpes vulpes
- Harbor seal, Phoca vitulina
- Gray seal, Halichoerus grypus
- Harp seal, Pagophilus groenlandicus (rare visitor)
- Hooded seal, Cystophora cristata (accidental)

Even-toed ungulates:

- American bison, Bison bison extirpated
- Elk, Cervus canadensis reintroduced
  - Eastern elk, C. c. canadensis EX
  - Rocky Mountain elk, C. c. nelsoni introduced
- White-tailed deer, Odocoileus virginianus
- Wild boar, Sus scrofa introduced

=== Birds ===
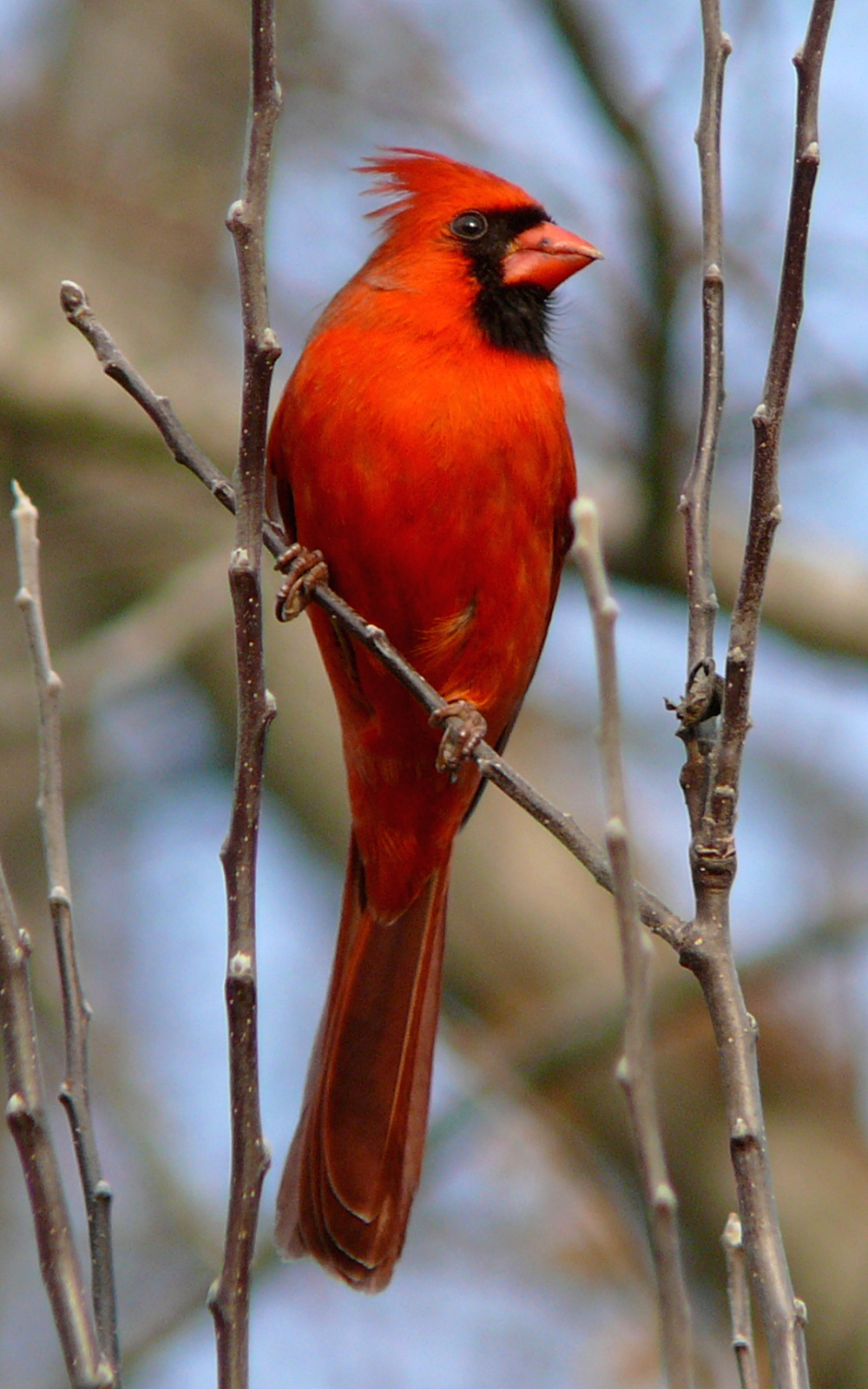
Cardinalis cardinalis (northern cardinal)

=== Reptiles ===
Adult male Terrapene carolina carolina, North Carolina's state reptile

=== Amphibians ===
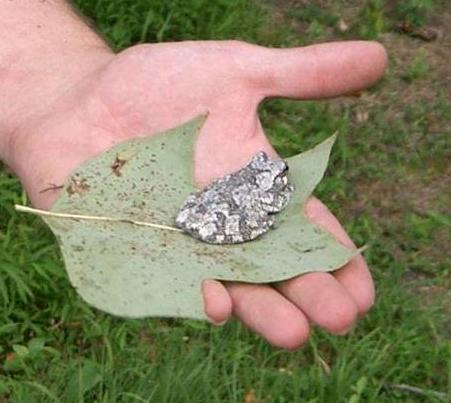
Frog, in Cary, North Carolina

Frogs are common in the marshy and wet regions of the Piedmont. The frog pictured at left is a Cope's gray treefrog (Hyla chrysocelis) or gray treefrog (H. versicolor). These two species cannot be differentiated except by their call or genetic analysis. However, H. versicolor is rare in the state and likely to not be pictured here. They are most abundant in some northern Piedmont counties. Other frogs of North Carolina include spring peepers, Pseudacris crucifer or Hyla crucifer. Common among Carolina forests, this frog lives in high branches of trees, although it is also seen on the ground and commonly on roadways.

Some common amphibians in North Carolina:

- Two-toed amphiuma, Amphiuma means
- Common mudpuppy, Necturus maculosus
- Dwarf waterdog, Necturus punctatus
- Eastern lesser siren, Siren intermedia
- Greater siren, Siren lacertina
- Red-spotted newt, Notophthalmus viridescens viridescens
- Mabee's salamander, Ambystoma mabeei
- Spotted salamander, Ambystoma maculatum
- Marbled salamander, Ambystoma opacum (state salamander)
- Mole salamander, genus Ambystoma
- Eastern tiger salamander, Ambystoma tigrinum
- Southern dusky salamander, Desmognathus auriculatus
- Dwarf salamander, Eurycea chamberlaini
- Four-toed salamander, Hemidactylium scutatum
- Wehrle's salamander, Plethodon wehrlei
- Eastern spadefoot, Scaphiopus holbrookii
- Southern toad, Anaxyrus terrestris
- Pine Barrens treefrog, Dryophytes andersonii (state frog)
- Cope's gray treefrog, Dryophytes chrysoscelis
- Green treefrog, Dryophytes cinereus or Hyla cinerea
- Squirrel treefrog, Dryophytes squirellus
- Gray treefrog, Dryophytes versicolor
- Little grass frog, Pseudacris ocularis
- Ornate chorus frog, Pseudacris ornata
- Upland chorus frog, Pseudacris feriarum
- American bullfrog, Lithobates catesbeianus
- Bronze frog, Lithobates clamitans
- Pickerel frog, Lithobates palustris
- Southern leopard frog, Rana sphenocephala
- Wood frog, Lithobates sylvaticus or Rana sylvatica

=== Fish ===
Freshwater:

- Roanoke bass, Ambloplites cavifrons
- largemouth bass, Micropterus nigricans
- rock bass, Ambloplites rupestris
- smallmouth bass, Micropterus dolomieu
- spotted bass, Micropterus punctulatus
- striped bass, Morone saxatilis
- white bass, Morone chrysops
- blue catfish, Ictalurus furcatus
- channel catfish, Ictalurus punctatus
- flathead catfish, Pylodictis olivaris
- brown bullhead, Ameiurus nebulosus
- white perch, Morone americana
- yellow perch, Perca flavescens
- chain pickerel, Esox niger
- redfin pickerel, Esox americanus americanus
- American shad, Alosa sapidissima
- hickory shad, Alosa mediocris
- pumpkinseed, Lepomis gibbosus
- redear, Lepomis microlophus
- bluegill, Lepomis macrochirus
- flier, Centrarchus macropterus
- green sunfish, Lepomis cyanellus
- redbrest, Lepomis auritus
- warmouth, Lepomis gulosus
- brook trout, Salvelinus fontinalis
- rainbow trout, Oncorhynchus mykiss
- brown trout, Salmo trutta
- garfish, Belone belone
- bowfin, Amia calva
- freshwater drum, Aplodinotus grunniens,
- grass carp, Ctenopharyngodon idella
- kokanee salmon, Oncorhynchus nerka
- muskellunge, Esox masquinongy
- tiger muskellunge, Esox lucius
- northern pike, Esox lucius
- sauger, Sander canadensis
- eastern mosquitofish, Gambusia holbrooki
- smallmouth buffalo, Ictiobus bubalus
- walleye, Sander vitreus
- Cape Fear shiner, Notropis mekistocholas

Saltwater:

- albacore, Thunnus alalunga
- Atlantic bonito, Sarda sarda
- Atlantic tarpon, Megalops atlanticus
- barracuda, Sphyraena
- bigeye tuna, Thunnus obesus
- blackfin tuna, Thunnus atlanticus
- black drum, Pogonias cromis
- black sea bass, Centropristis striata
- blacktip shark, Carcharhinus limbatus
- bluefish, Pomatomus saltatrix
- blue marlin, Makaira nigricans
- bull shark, Carcharhinus leucas
- butterfish, Peprilus triacanthus
- cobia, Rachycentron canadum
- croaker, Sciaenidae
- dolphinfish, Coryphaena
- gray triggerfish, Balistes capriscus
- gray trout, Salvelinus namaycush
- hammerhead sharks, Sphyrnidae
- hickory shad, Alosa mediocris
- hogchoker, Trinectes maculatus
- hogfish, Lachnolaimus maximus
- king mackerel, Scomberomorus cavalla
- knobbed porgy, Calamus nodosus
- lizardfish, Synodontidae
- little tunny, Euthynnus alletteratus
- mako shark, Isurus
- menhaden, Ethmidium
- northern puffer, Sphoeroides maculatus
- oyster toadfish, Opsanus tau
- pigfish, Congiopodus
- pinfish, Sparidae
- pompano, Trachinotus
- red drum, Sciaenops ocellatus
- red grouper, Epinephelus morio
- red snapper, Lutjanus campechanus
- sailfish, Istiophorus
- scamp, Epinephelidae
- searobin, Triglidae
- sheepshead, Archosargus probatocephalus
- silver perch, Bairdiella chrysoura,
- skate, Rajidae
- skipjack tuna, Katsuwonus pelamis
- spadefish, Ephippidae
- Spanish mackerel, Scomberomorini
- speckled hind, Epinephelus drummondhayi
- spottail pinfish, Diplodus holbrookii
- spot, Leiostomus xanthurus
- speckled trout, Salvelinus fontinalis
- stingray, Myliobatoidei
- striped bass, Morone saxatilis
- swordfish, Xiphias gladius
- tiger shark, Galeocerdo cuvier
- wahoo, Acanthocybium solandri
- white marlin, Kajikia albida
- white grunt, Haemulon plumierii
- yellowfin tuna, Thunnus albacares
- yellowedge grouper, Hyporthodus
- yellowtail snapper, Ocyurus chrysurus

=== Invertebrates ===
Various insects, jellyfish, millipedes, centipedes, freshwater crayfish and freshwater mollusks.

Spiders:

- northern black widow, Latrodectus variolus
- southern black widow, Latrodectus mactans
- false black widow, Steatoda grossa)
- common house spider, Parasteatoda tepidariorum)
- yellow garden spider, Argiope aurantia
- leafy cob weaver, Theridion frondeum)
- spiny-backed orbweaver, Gasteracantha cancriformis
- white sac spider, Elaver excepta
- orchard orb weaver, Leucauge venusta

Mantises:

- Carolina mantis, Stagmomantis carolina

Hymenoptera:

- European honey bee, Apis mellifera state insect
- American bumblebee, Bombus pensylvanicus
- eastern carpenter bee, Xylocopa virginica
- red paper wasp, Polistes carolina
- eastern cicada killer, Sphecius speciosus
- red velvet ant, Dasymutilla occidentalis
- red imported fire ant, Solenopsis invicta

Odonata:

- eastern pondhawk, Erythemis simplicicollis.

Lepidopterans:

- monarch butterfly, Danaus plexippus
- red-spotted purple Limenitis arthemi

== Plant life ==
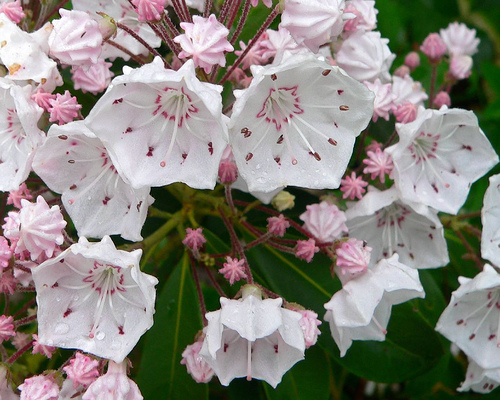
Mountain laurel (Kalmia latifolia)
