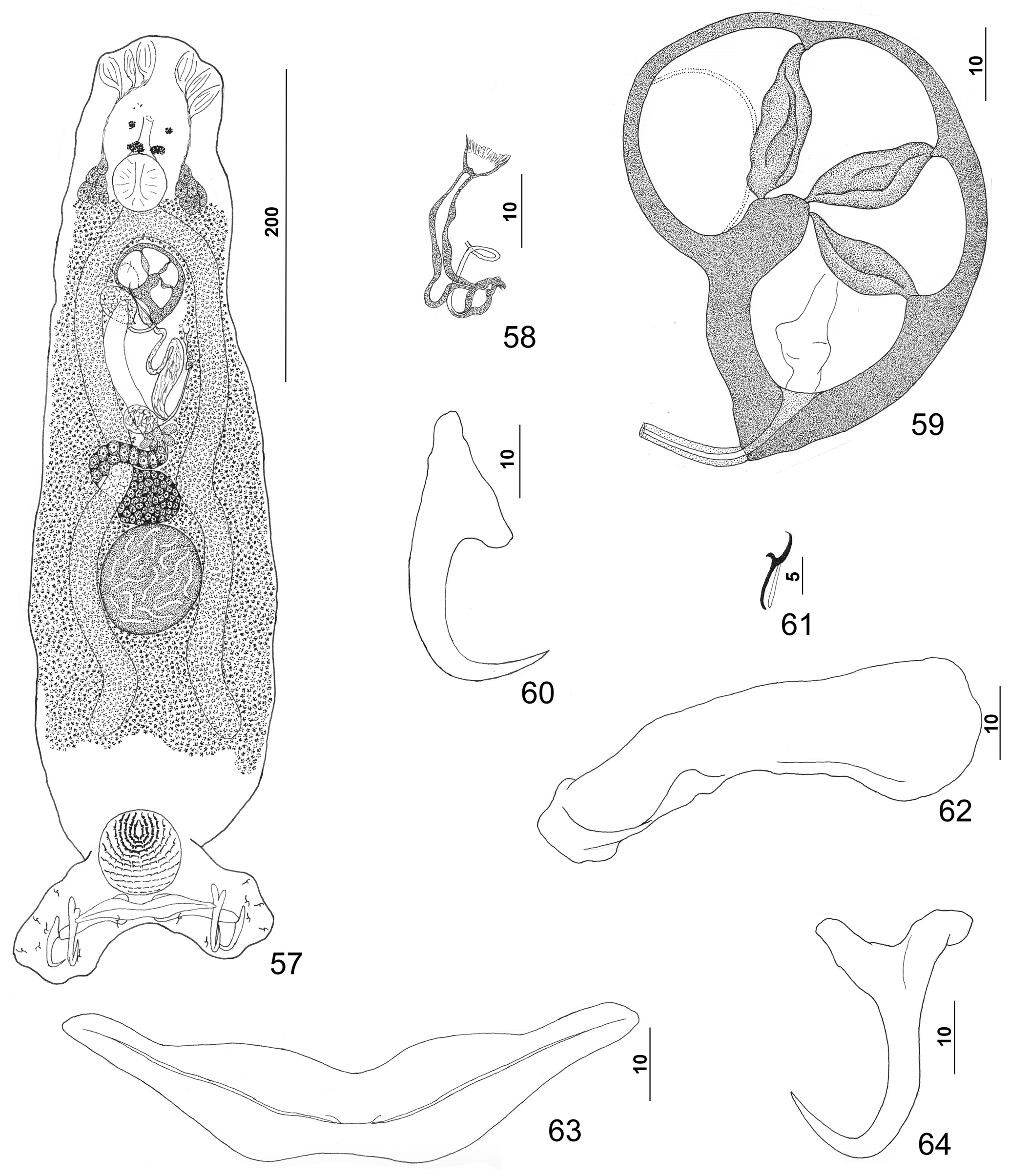
- Body and sclerotised parts

Scientific classification
- Kingdom: Animalia
- Phylum: Platyhelminthes
- Class: Monogenea
- Order: Dactylogyridea
- Family: Diplectanidae
- Genus: Pseudorhabdosynochus
- Species: P. firmicoleatus

Binomial name
- Pseudorhabdosynochus firmicoleatus Kritsky, Bakenhaster & Adams, 2015

= Pseudorhabdosynochus firmicoleatus =

Species of flatworm

Pseudorhabdosynochus firmicoleatus is a diplectanid monogenean parasite on the gills of the Yellowedge grouper, Epinephelus flavolimbatus and the Snowy grouper, Epinephelus niveatus. It was described by Kritsky, Bakenhaster and Adams in 2015.

== Etymology ==
The specific epithet is derived from the Latin words firm(i) ("firm"), cole(o) ("sheath") and -atus ("marked by having"), in reference to the heavy thick-walled chambers of the MCO.

== Description ==
Pseudorhabdosynochus firmicoleatus is a small monogenean, 400-500 μm in length. The species has the general characteristics of other species of Pseudorhabdosynochus, with a flat body and a posterior haptor, which is the organ by which the monogenean attaches itself to the gill of is host. The haptor bears two squamodiscs, one ventral and one dorsal. The sclerotized male copulatory organ, or "quadriloculate organ", has the shape of a bean with four internal chambers, as in other species of Pseudorhabdosynochus. The vagina includes a sclerotized part, which is a complex structure.

== Diagnosis ==
Pseudorhabdosynochus firmicoleatus from snowy grouper, sclerotisd parts

Kritsky, Bakenhaster & Adams (2015) wrote that Pseudorhabdosynochus firmicoleatus most closely resembles Pseudorhabdosynochus sulamericanus (a species described by Santos, Buchmann and Gibson in 2000) in the general morphology of the vaginal sclerite. The structure in both species possesses a delicate distal funnel at its attachment to the vaginal vestibule, a proximal bulge of the distal tube, and a small chamber. In P. firmicoleatus, however, the vaginal sclerite is delicate and lacks the irregular sclerites along the distal tube typical of P. sulamericanus. It further differs from P. sulamericanus in that the deep root of the ventral anchor has its proximal end directed dorsally. Finally, tegumental scales are lacking and the squamodiscs of P. firmicoleatus have 11–13 rows of rodlets, vs tegumental scales present and 14–17 rows in the squamodiscs of P. sulamericanus). No significant differences were observed between specimens of P. firmicoleatus collected from yellowedge and snowy groupers.

== Hosts and localities ==
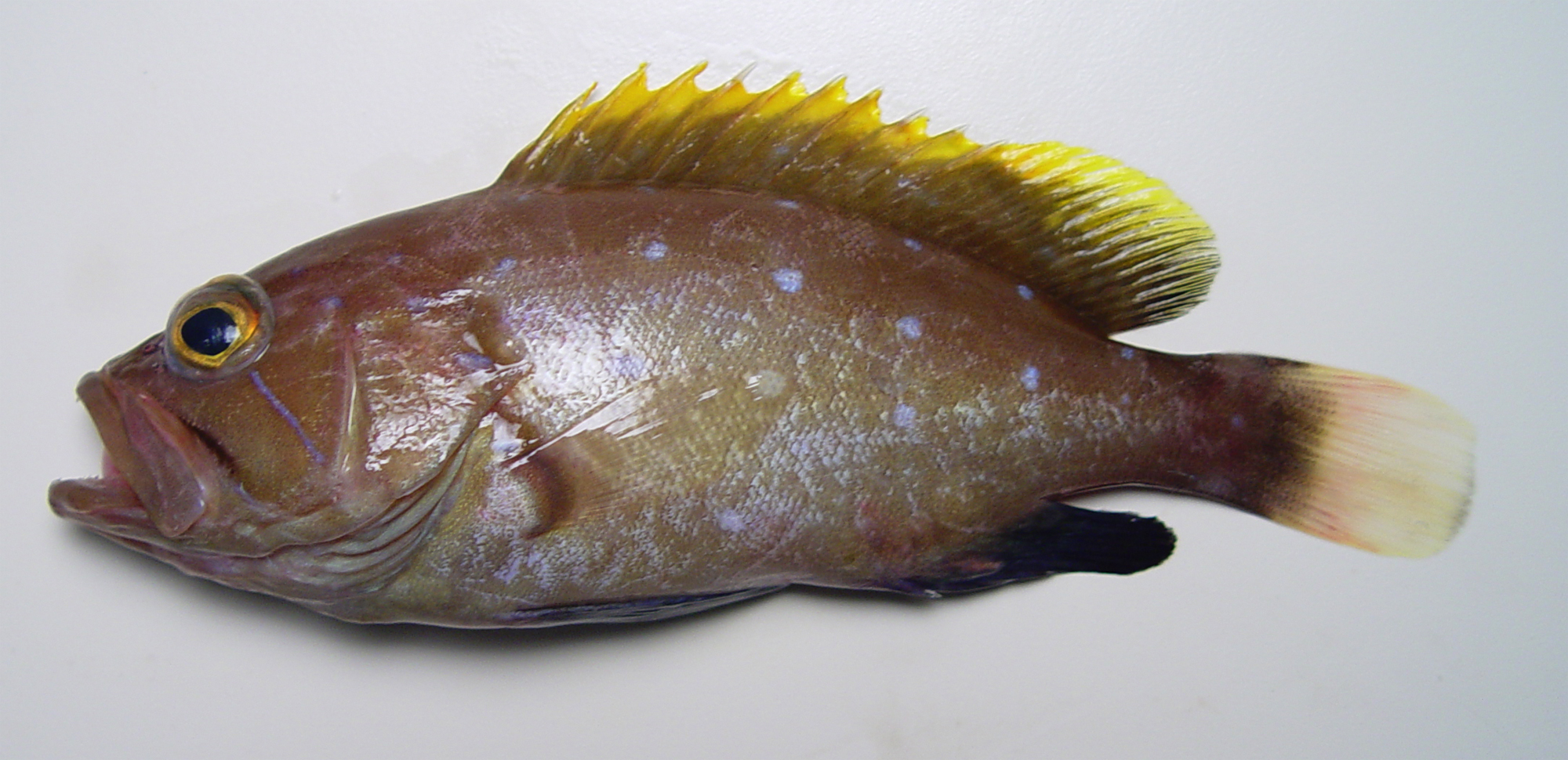
The yellowedge grouper, Epinephelus flavolimbatus is the type-host of Pseudorhabdosynochus firmicoleatus

The type-host is the yellowedge grouper, Epinephelus flavolimbatus; the species has also been found on the gills of the Snowy grouper, Epinephelus niveatus. The type-locality is the open Gulf of Mexico, 70 miles south of Panama City, Florida. The record on the Snowy grouper is from the Gulf of Mexico, 60 miles south-west of Pensacola, Florida.
