= Rooster hind =

Conservation status
- Vulnerable (IUCN 3.1)

Scientific classification
- Kingdom: Animalia
- Phylum: Chordata
- Class: Actinopterygii
- Division: Teleostei
- Order: Perciformes
- Family: Epinephelidae
- Genus: Hyporthodus
- Species: H. acanthistius

Binomial name
- Hyporthodus acanthistius (Gilbert, 1892)

Synonyms
- Bodianus acanthistius Gilbert, 1892; Cephalopholis acanthistius (Gilbert, 1892); Cephalopholis popino Walford, 1936; Epinephelus acanthistius (Gilbert, 1892)

Species of fish

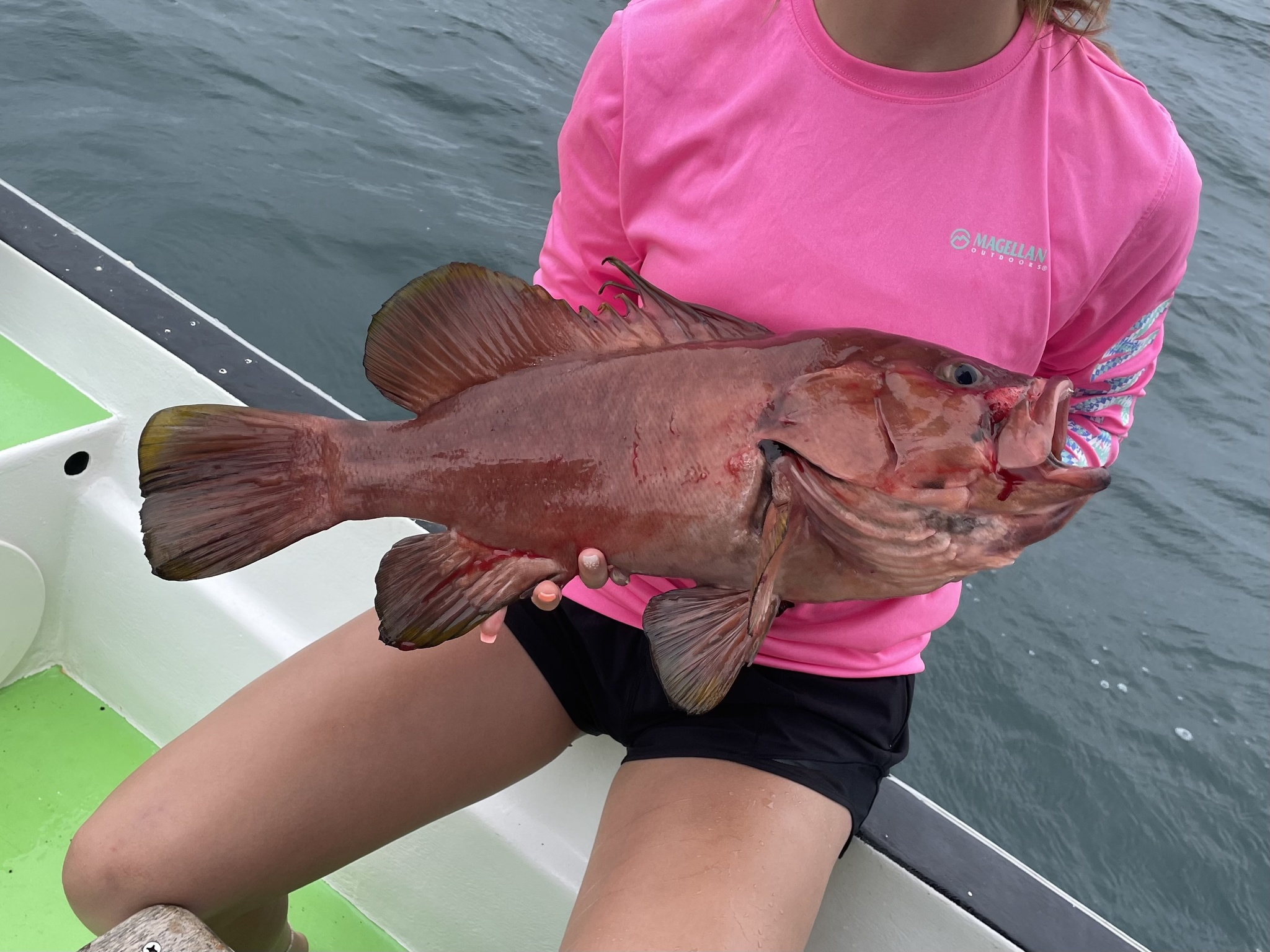
Rooster hind

The Rooster Hind (Hyporthodus acanthistius) is a marine fish found in the tropical eastern Pacific Ocean. It is also known as the Gulf Coney, Baqueta, Cherna Roja, Cherna Rosa, and Merou Coq in various places across its range. The Rooster Hind's dorsal fins have 16-18 rays and 11 spines with the third, fourth and fifth elongated. Their anal fins have eight rays and three spines. Mature length ranges from 63 to 68.9 cm (24.8 to 27.1 in) on average but they can reach up to at least 130 cm (51 in). They reach weights of 15 kg (33 lb). Maturity is reached at around age eight, and individuals have been documented to reach 28 years of age.

== Taxonomy ==
The Rooster Hind is in the Serranoidei order, and Epinephelidae family. Initially put in the Bodianus genus by Charles H. Gilbert in 1892, its classification was later changed to the Hyporthodus genus and H. acanthistius species. It is one of 14 species in the Hyporthodus genus and sometimes confused with the similar species Olive Grouper (Epinephelus cifuentesi) and Star-studded Grouper (Hyporthodus niphobles) because of their similar body shape and coloration.

== Distribution and habitat ==
The Rooster Hind is found in the tropical waters along the western coasts of tropical North, Central and South America from southern California to central Peru in the Pacific Ocean. This fish is a demersal species which inhabits rocky reefs and muddy sea floors. It lives far below the surface at depths of 46 to 90 metres (151 to 295 ft).

== Ecology ==
The Rooster Hind is a benthic feeder which consumes small fish, cephalopods (such as octopus and squid), and various crustaceans. It hunts by sneaking up and ambushing them in the poorly lit depths. Like other groupers, the Rooster Hind will congregate off shore near the continental shelf in areas with significant structural relief, or rocky points that are near a sharp drop off. Its ecology including behavior, reproduction, diet and habitat is poorly studied and there is little other information available on the topic.

== Life history ==
Rooster Hinds reach sexual maturity relatively late, around age eight, and generation times are long. The Rooster Hind performs aggregate spawning where large numbers gather to release their eggs and milt. The Rooster Hind exhibits sequential hermaphroditism, which means that a dominant male fish mates with a group of females, and if he dies the dominant female will become a male and take his place. Big old fat fecund female (BOFFF) groupers are more fecund than younger and thinner groupers, and therefore contribute more to the population dynamics. Grouper eggs are buoyant, and incubated in water temperatures around 21–31 °C (70–88 °F). The eggs will hatch after 24-72 hours. Newly hatched larvae live on the yolk for 3-4 days. Larvae then become planktotrophic, feeding on zooplankton and phytoplankton near the top of the water column. Once they reach a more mature size they descend down to suitable habitat.

== Human uses ==
Commercial and recreational harvesting of the Rooster Hind is common throughout its range, and is highly valued in some fish markets. Especially targeted in the Gulf of California, Southern Mexico and Colombia, where they call the fish "Chernas". From the years 1993 and 1996 Rooster Hind represented 22.9% by weight of groupers caught in Colombian waters.

== Threats and conservation ==
Hyporthodus acanthistius is listed as vulnerable by the IUCN meaning that it could become endangered if conservation action is not taken. Most of its range lacks any sort of protection. In Colombia landings of H. acanthistius dropped by around 50% in number from 1995 to 2010. In addition from 2012-2014, 68-77.5% of these fish caught were of a lower size than sexual maturity. In the Gulf of California in the 1990s the annual catch of Rooster Hind was 180 tons, and by 2002 annual catch of Rooster Hind was down to 20 tons, a decline of 90%. According to IUCN estimates, populations have declined 32-98% throughout their range from 1962-2016 (during three generations of Rooster Hind). Insufficient population data is available however, due to limited studies and the fish's deep-water habitat. Overexploitation is a main cause for decline for this species as fishing throughout most of its range is currently at unsustainable levels. There are currently no conservation measures in place to protect this species from overfishing or restore populations.
