= Hyporthodus septemfasciatus =

Conservation status
- Data Deficient (IUCN 3.1)

Scientific classification
- Kingdom: Animalia
- Phylum: Chordata
- Class: Actinopterygii
- Division: Teleostei
- Order: Perciformes
- Family: Epinephelidae
- Genus: Hyporthodus
- Species: H. septemfasciatus

Binomial name
- Hyporthodus septemfasciatus (Thunberg, 1793)

Species of fish

Hyporthodus septemfasciatus, the convict grouper, is a large species of grouper known from the waters of Japan, South Korea and China. Reports from western Australia are treated as misidentifications of Hyporthodus octofasciatus. This species is unique among the groupers that it can tolerate temperatures of down to 8°C (46.4°F) and can grow up to 155 cm and 62.8 kg (61 inches and 138 lbs). This reef-associated species is found at depths of 5-30 m (16 to 98 ft) and feeds on small fishes and crustaceans. In Japan, it is prized as a food fish and commercially cultured.

This species is considered by some researchers to be a member of the genus Epinephelus.
