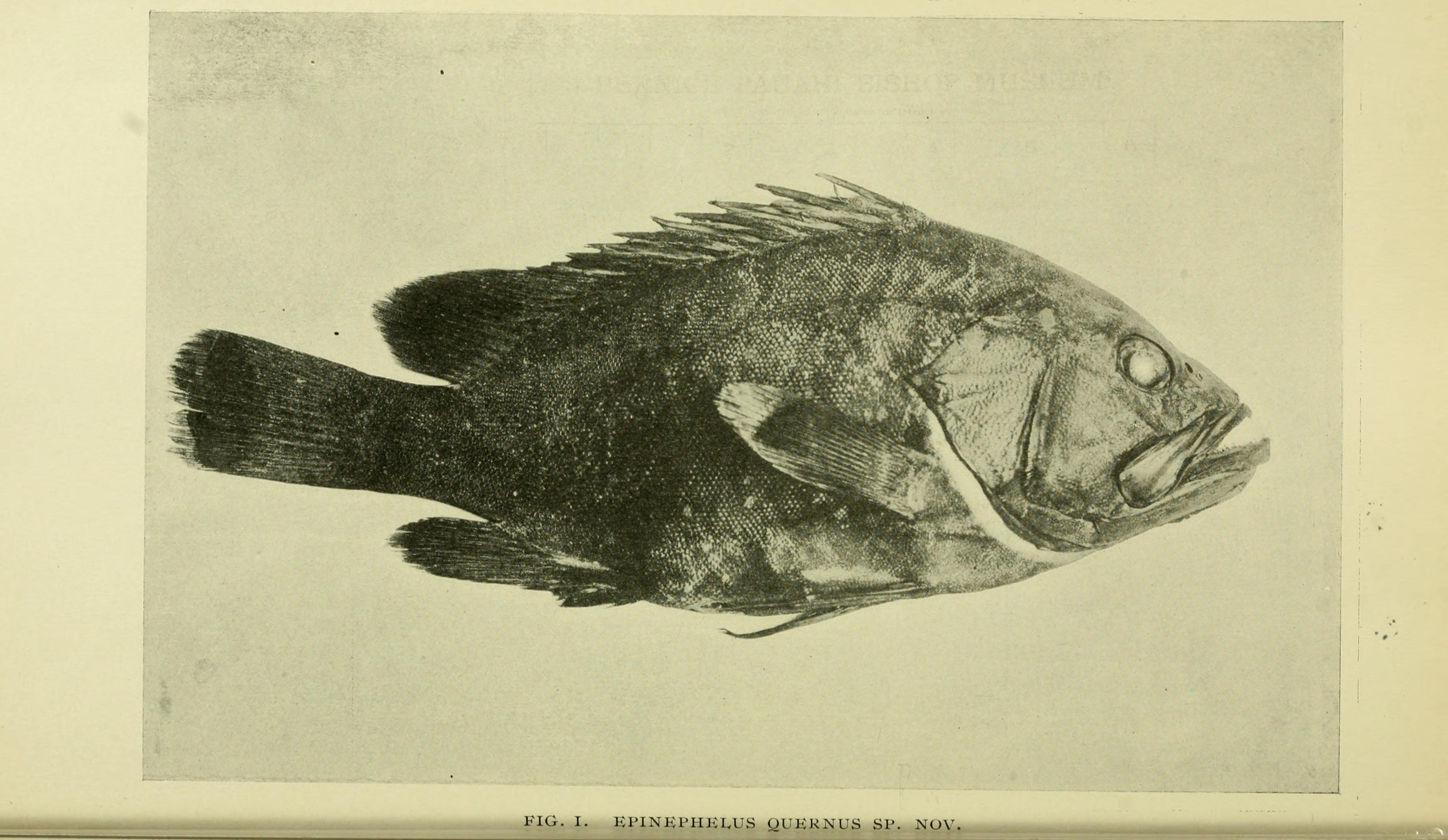

Conservation status
- Least Concern (IUCN 3.1)

Scientific classification
- Kingdom: Animalia
- Phylum: Chordata
- Class: Actinopterygii
- Order: Perciformes
- Family: Epinephelidae
- Genus: Hyporthodus
- Species: H. quernus

Binomial name
- Hyporthodus quernus (Seale, 1901)

Synonyms
- Epinephelus quernus Seale, 1901

= Hawaiian grouper =

Species of fish

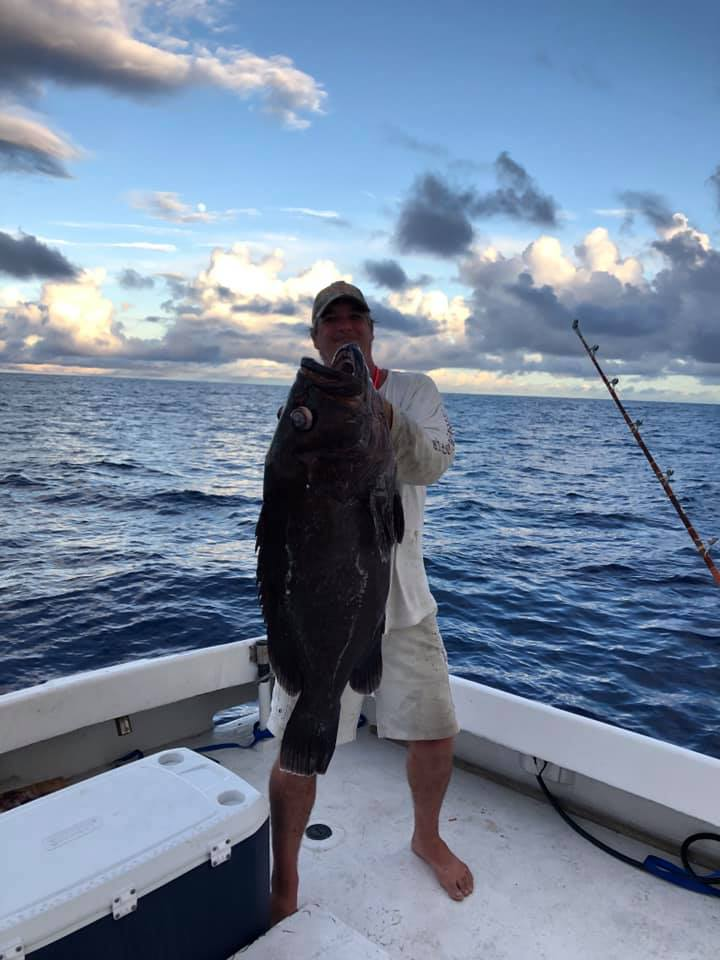
Hapu'upu'u or Hawaiian Grouper, 37 lbs. caught by Capt. Anthony Ballam in Northeastern Hawaii Island on November 8, 2019. This particular specimen was black with small white spots and had a bluish tinted belly.

The Hawaiian grouper (Hyporthodus quernus), also known as the Hawaiian black grouper, Seale's grouper or Hapuʻupuʻu, is a species of marine ray-finned fish, a grouper from the subfamily Epinephelinae which is part of the family Serranidae, which also includes the anthias and sea basses. It is endemic to Hawaii.

== Taxonomy ==
The Hawaiian grouper was first formally described in 1901 as Epinephelus quernus by the American ichthyologist Alvin Seale (1871-1958) with the type locality given as Honolulu. It was formerly considered to be in the genus Epinephelus but is now considered to belong to the genus Hyporthodus. The specific name quernus means "oaken", presumably a reference to its reddish colour as an adult.

== Description ==
The Hawaiian grouper has a body which has a standard length that is 2.3 to 2.7 times its depth. It has an angular preopercle which has 3-4 enlarged serrations at its angle, with the lowest pointing downwards. The upper margin of the gill cover is convex. The dorsal fin contains 11 spines and 14-15 soft rays while the anal fin has 3 spines and 9 soft rays. The membranes between the dorsal fin spines are deeply notched. The caudal fin is rounded. The adults are dark brown in overall colour and are marked with 8 vertical series of faint white spots which are obscured by many extra pale spots and blotches which vary in size. The fins of adults are largely plain and have a similar colour to the body apart from a small number of pale spots along the base part of the dorsal fin. Depending on habitat and where geographically found, some have a slight blue tint to their belly in the mature older adults, whereas in other areas they can have a slight reddish tint possibly for camouflage from predators. Juveniles are more variable in colour and may be pale greyish and the series of pale spots are more distinct and unobscured. This species has a maximum published total length of 122 centimetres (48 in) and a maximum weight of 22.7 kilograms (50 lb). The largest recorded specimen caught was 31.75 kilograms (70 lbs) off of Puako, Northwest Hawaii Island.

== Distribution ==
The Hawaiian grouper is endemic to Hawaii and its range includes the Northwestern Hawaiian Islands and the Johnston Atoll.

== Habitat and biology ==
The Hawaiian grouper is a demersal species which is found on coral and rocky reefs at depths between 20 and 380 metres (66 and 1,247 ft). It is a protogynous hermaphrodite and 50% of the females are sexually mature at 58 centimetres (23 in), when they are around 6 years old, although it has been recorded in fish at 32.8 centimetres (12.9 in). At a total length of 89.5 centimetres (35.2 in) 50% of the females change sex to become males, although this can occur at 75.3 centimetres (29.6 in). The spawning season runs from February to June, peaking in March. This predatory species prefers to prey on other fishes with crustaceans, especially shrimp, as a second preference.

== Utilisation ==
The Hawaiian grouper is valued for having clear white flesh which has a delicate flavour. It is regarded as a member of the "Deep 7" group of fish species which live in deep water, near the bottom, and are a valuable resource for fisheries in Hawaii, these species accounting for 50% of the total commercial catch in the State.
