= Hyporthodus chabaudi =

Scientific classification
- Kingdom: Animalia
- Phylum: Chordata
- Class: Actinopterygii
- Division: Teleostei
- Order: Perciformes
- Family: Epinephelidae
- Genus: Hyporthodus
- Species: H. chabaudi

Binomial name
- Hyporthodus chabaudi (Castelnau, 1861)

Species of fish

Hyporthodus chabaudi, commonly referred to as the moustache grouper or Chabaud's grouper, is a species of marine ray-finned fish in the grouper family.

== Taxonomy ==
Hyporthodus chabaudi was first described as Serranus chabaudi. It was historically classified in the genus Epinephelus until 2018 when genetic analyses showed it was nested in the genus Hyporthodus.
