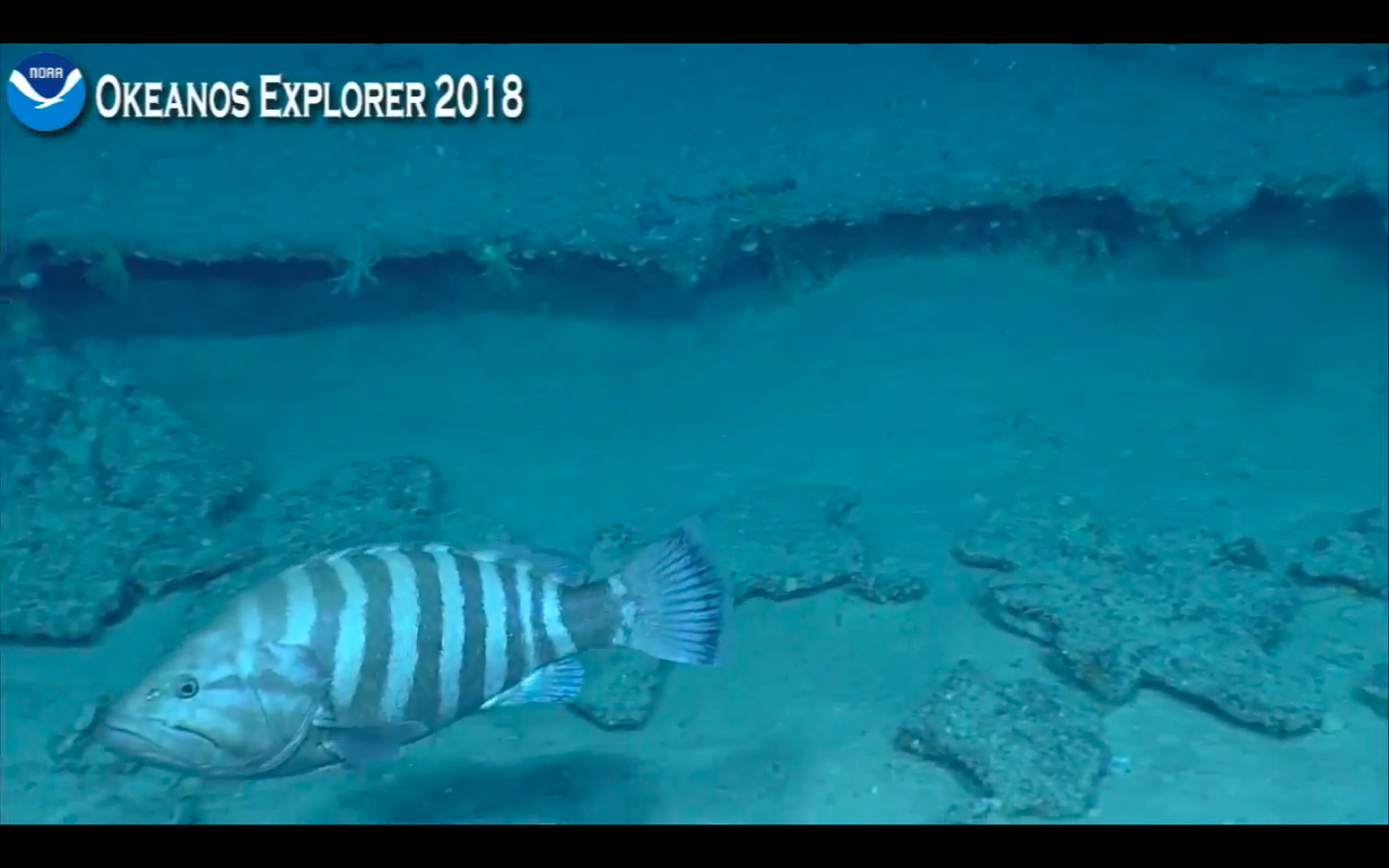

Conservation status
- Least Concern (IUCN 3.1)

Scientific classification
- Kingdom: Animalia
- Phylum: Chordata
- Class: Actinopterygii
- Order: Perciformes
- Family: Epinephelidae
- Genus: Hyporthodus
- Species: H. mystacinus

Binomial name
- Hyporthodus mystacinus (Poey, 1852)

Synonyms
- Serranus mystacinus Poey, 1852; Epinephelus mystacinus (Poey, 1852)

= Hyporthodus mystacinus =

Species of fish

Hyporthodus mystacinus, the misty grouper, black grouper, convict grouper, eightbar grouper or moustache grouper, is a species of marine ray-finned fish, a grouper from the subfamily Epinephelinae which is part of the family Serranidae, which also includes the anthias and sea basses. It is primarily found in the Caribbean and the Gulf of Mexico with populations present around the Galapagos Islands and Central American coastlines.

== Description ==
Hyporthodus mystacinus has a robust, relatively deep and oval body which is laterally compressed. The body is deepest at the origin of dorsal fin and its standard length is 2.4 to 2.9 times its depth at this point. It has a convex are between the eyes. The preopercle is rounded with enlarged serrations, the smaller serrations at the corner being encased in flesh. The dorsal fin contains 11 spines and 14-15 soft rays while the anal fin has 3 spines and 8-9 soft rays. The membranes between the dorsal fin spines are deeply notched. The caudal fin is rounded. The adults have an overall colour of chocolate brown marked with pale spots and 9-10 dark vertical bars on the head and the body which extend on to the dorsal and anal fins. The rearmost is on the base of the caudal fin and is the broadest and darkest. There are 3 diagonal dark stripes on the side of the head, one runs along the top of upper jaw and there are vertical bars on the cheek with a further two to the rear of the eye reaching the gill cover. Juveniles resemble adults but have a darker head and a wide black bar across the base of the tail. The maximum published total length is 160 centimetres (63 in) for males and 100 centimetres (39 in) for females while the maximum published weight is 107 kilograms (236 lb).

== Distribution ==
Hyporthodus mystacinus is found in the western Atlantic Ocean and the eastern Pacific Ocean. In the western Atlantic it is found from North Carolina southwards along the eastern coast of the United States to the Florida Keys, The Bahamas, Bermuda and into the Gulf of Mexico and the Caribbean Sea. In South America they are found from Santa Marta in Colombia to Rio de Janeiro in Brazil. In the Eastern Pacific it has been recorded from the Galapagos and coastal Ecuador, as well as from the Paramount Seamount and the Costa Rican Cocos Island.

== Habitat and biology ==
Hyporthodus mystacinus is a solitary fish of deep water with hard substrates with a depth range is from 100 to 400 metres (330 to 1,310 ft). Its diet consists of squids, crustaceans, and smaller fish. This species is mainly found over steep rocky bottoms along the edge of the continental shelf and around offshore islands and seamounts. Juveniles are found in shallower waters than adults, sometimes at depths as shallow as 340 metres (1,120 ft). Little is known about this species, possibly due to it being currently listed as Least Concern by IUCN.

== Taxonomy ==
Hyporthodus mystacinus was first formally described as Serranus mystacinus in 1852 by the Cuban zoologist Felipe Poey (1799–1891) with the type locality given as Cuba. It was considered to be in the genus Epinephelus but is now considered to belong to the genus Hyporthodus.

== Utilisation ==
Hyporthodus mystacinus is a commercially viable gamefish, though not as popular as similar species of groupers, possibly due to its depth distribution. It is also taken by commercial fisheries which, in the Galapagos and Brazil they are caught by trolling, long lines and hand lines.
