= Hyporthodus exsul =

Conservation status
- Least Concern (IUCN 3.1)

Scientific classification
- Kingdom: Animalia
- Phylum: Chordata
- Class: Actinopterygii
- Order: Perciformes
- Family: Epinephelidae
- Genus: Hyporthodus
- Species: H. exsul

Binomial name
- Hyporthodus exsul (Fowler, 1944)

Synonyms
- Serrihastaperca exsul Fowler, 1944; Epinephelus exsul (Fowler, 1944)

Species of fish

The tenspine grouper (Hyporthodus exsul) is a species of marine ray-finned fish, a grouper from the subfamily Epinephelinae which is part of the family Serranidae, which also includes the anthias and sea basses. It is found along the western coast of Mexico and Central America, but is a very rare fish of which little information exists.

== Description ==
The tenspine grouper has a robust, relatively deep body which has a standard length that is 2.3 times its depth. There is a convex area between the eyes. The preopercle is angular with serrated edges, the serrations being enlarged at the angle and they are not always present on the lower edge. The dorsal fin contains 10 spines and 13–14 soft rays while the anal fin has 3 spines and 8 soft rays. The membranes between the dorsal fin spines are distinctly incised. The caudal fin is rounded. The adults are an overall greyish brown colour. The juveniles are a similar colour but are marked with large white spots over their body and the bases of the dorsal and anal fins with darker dorsal, anal and pelvic fins, while the outer parts of the caudal and, in some specimens, the tail is white. Both adults and juveniles have a black maxillary stripe. This species attains a maximum total length of 125 centimetres (49 in).

== Distribution ==
The tenspine grouper is found on the Pacific coast of Central America from the Gulf of California south along the coastlines of Mexico, Guatemala, Honduras, El Salvador, Nicaragua, Costa Rica and Panama.

== Habitat and biology ==
The tenspine grouper is a demersal species which can be found on rocky reefs to depths of at least 72 metres (236 ft). It has been taken as bycatch by shrimp fisheries which suggests it lives over sandy or muddy bottoms, although this requires confirmation. It forms aggregations over complex reefs with high-relief but whether this is related to spawning is not yet known. It is a rare species and its biology is little studied. It is thought to feed on cephalopods, crustaceans and smaller fishes.

== Taxonomy ==
The tenspine grouper was first formally described as Serrihastaperca exsul in 1944 by the American zoologist Henry Weed Fowler (1878-1965) with the type biology given as about 20 miles south of Mazatlán in Mexico. It was considered to be in the genus Epinephelus but is now considered to belong to the genus Hyporthodus.

== Utlisation ==
The tenspine grouper is a rare species and, as such, is of little interest to fisheries.

== Sources ==
- Froese, Rainer; Pauly, Daniel, eds. (2016). "Hyporthodus exsul". FishBase.
