= Hyporthodus cifuentesi =

Conservation status
- Least Concern (IUCN 3.1)

Scientific classification
- Kingdom: Animalia
- Phylum: Chordata
- Class: Actinopterygii
- Division: Teleostei
- Order: Perciformes
- Family: Epinephelidae
- Genus: Hyporthodus
- Species: H. cifuentesi

Binomial name
- Hyporthodus cifuentesi (Lavenberg & Grove, 1993)

Species of fish

Hyporthodus cifuentesi, the olive grouper, is a species of marine ray-finned fish of the family Epinephelidae. It is found in the Eastern Pacific Ocean off the coasts of Costa Rica and the Galápagos Islands. It inhabits deep-water rocky reefs between 40–120 m in depth.

== Description ==
It is described to have a convex head shape with a fusiform lateral body shape and truncate caudal fins. Its body is covered with ctenoid scales and has a distinct coloration of pale brown with a greenish sheen, fins are a darker brown than the body and have a blue-green sheen. It has a maximum length of 100 cm and a weight of around 22.3 kg.
