= Speckled hind =

Conservation status
- Data Deficient (IUCN 3.1)

Scientific classification
- Kingdom: Animalia
- Phylum: Chordata
- Class: Actinopterygii
- Division: Teleostei
- Order: Perciformes
- Family: Epinephelidae
- Genus: Hyporthodus
- Species: H. drummondhayi

Binomial name
- Hyporthodus drummondhayi Goode & Bean, 1878

Species of fish

The speckled hind (Hyporthodus drummondhayi), also known as the calico grouper, kitty mitchell or strawberry grouper, is a species of marine ray-finned fish, a grouper of the family Epinephelidae. It is found in Bermuda and off the eastern coast of North America. Its natural habitats are open seas, shallow seas, aquatic beds, and coral reefs. The species, like many other types of marine life in the region, is threatened by habitat loss.

== Taxonomy ==
The speckled hind was first formally described as Epinephelus drummondhayi by the American ichthyologists George Brown Goode (1851–1896) and Tarleton Hoffman Bean (1846–1916) in 1878 with the type locality given as Pensacola in Florida. Since 2018 some authorities have placed this species in the genus Hyporthodus

The specific name honours the Scottish officer in the British Army and ornithologist, Lieutenant-Colonel Henry Drummond-Hay (1814–1896), originally of Perth, Scotland, who discovered the species on Bermuda.

== Distribution ==
The speckled hind is found in the western Atlantic Ocean where it occurs around Bermuda as well as on the eastern coast of the United States where it is found as far north as North Carolina extending south to the Florida Keys and into the Gulf of Mexico as far east as Louisiana, it also occurs off the Yucatan Peninsula. Reports of this species in the Bahamas or the Greater Antilles require confirmation.

== Description ==
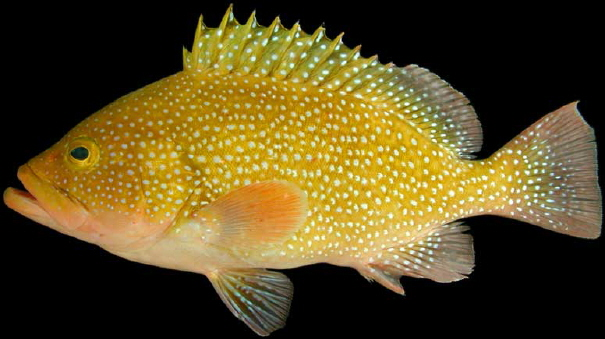
Juvenile

The speckled hind attains a total length of 120 centimetres (47 in) and a maximum weight of 30 kilograms (66 lb). The body is robust, compressed and is deepest at the origin of the dorsal fin. The body's standard length is 2.4 to 2.6 times its depth and is equal to the length of the head. The maxilla is exposed when the mouth is closed. The margin of the gill cover bears three flat spines, while the preopercle is serrated with enlarged spines at its angle. The dorsal fin has 11 spines and 14–16 soft rays while the anal fin contains 3 spines and 9 soft rays. The membrane of the dorsal fin has deep indentations between the spines. The caudal fin is rounded with acutely angled corners. There are 72–76 scales in the lateral line.

The background colour of the head and body is dark reddish brown to grey, but it is densely speckled with tiny white spots, these sometimes merge to form a network pattern in larger individuals, the outer part of the pectoral fin is yellowish. The juveniles are bright yellow and are covered in small blue-white spots.

== Habitat and biology ==
H. drummondhayi

Speckled hind adults are found on offshore areas with rocky substrates at depths of 25 to 183 metres (82 to 600 ft), although they are most often recorded at 60 and 120 metres (200 and 390 ft). The juveniles are typically found in shallower waters than the adults. Like other groupers, the speckled hind is a predatory fish and the prey taken includes other fishes, crustaceans such as crab, shrimp and lobsters as well as molluscs such as squid. They are protogynous hermaphrodites and gather in aggregations to spawn. The females become sexually mature at 4 or 5 years oold and at 45 to 60 centimetres (18 to 24 in) in total length and the sex change to male takes place between 7 and 14 years old. it is a long lived species which may have a life span of up to 80 years.

== Utilisation ==
Speckled hind are taken as bycatch by commercial fisheries for other species of grouper and snapper off the United States coasts. It is targeted by recreational fisheries too. There is a bag limit for both commercial and recreational fisheries in the United States is one fish per vessel per trip. However, the species is still overfished and this may be because of bycatch being returned to the sea after being injured in the process of being taken.
