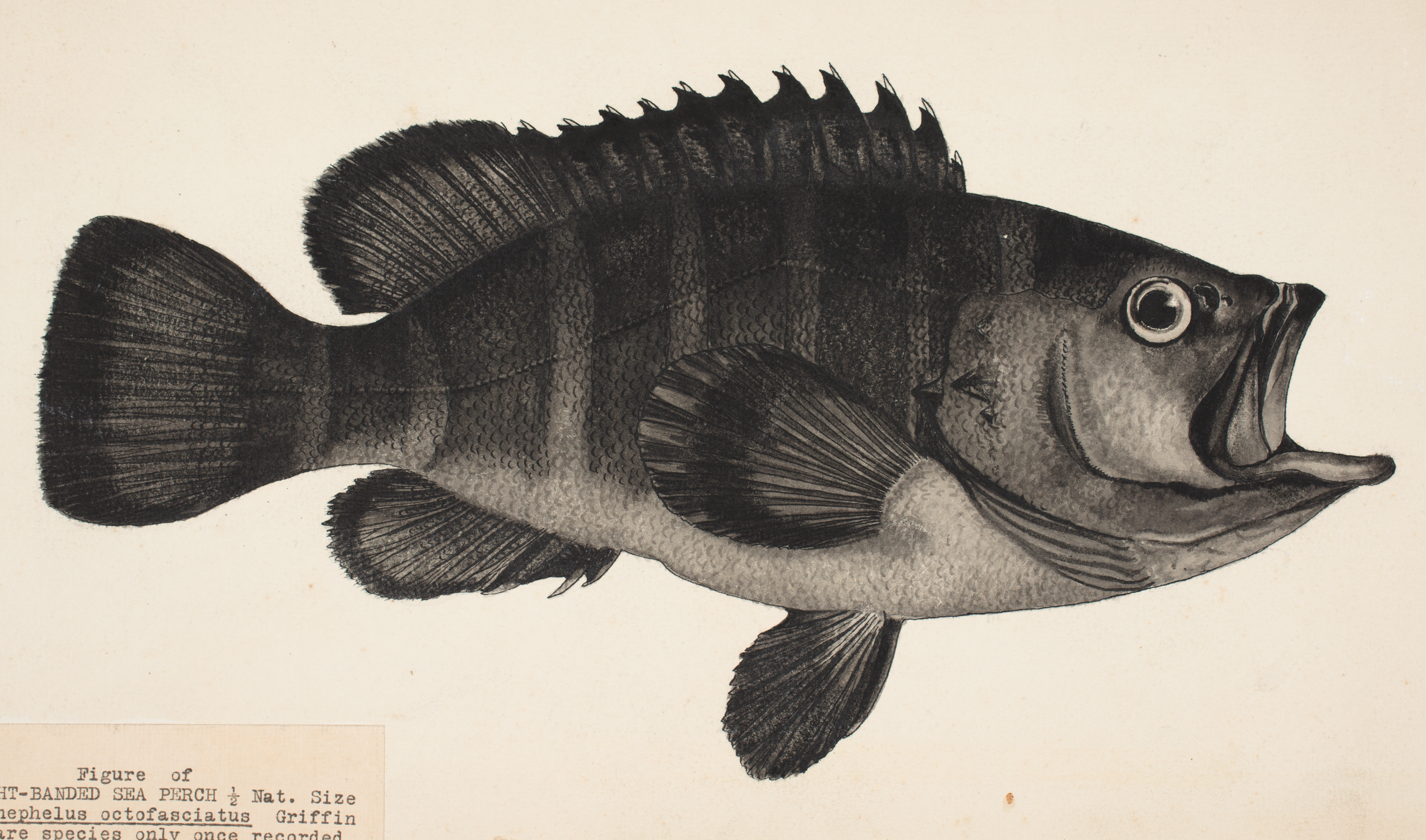
- 1923 illustration by Louis Thomas Griffin

Conservation status
- Data Deficient (IUCN 3.1)

Scientific classification
- Kingdom: Animalia
- Phylum: Chordata
- Class: Actinopterygii
- Order: Perciformes
- Family: Epinephelidae
- Genus: Hyporthodus
- Species: H. octofasciatus

Binomial name
- Hyporthodus octofasciatus (Griffin, 1926)

Synonyms
- Epinephelus compressus Postel, Fourmanoir and Gueze, 1963; Epinephelus octofasciatus Griffin, 1926

= Hyporthodus octofasciatus =

Species of fish

Hyporthodus octofasciatus, the eightbar grouper, is a species of fish in the family Serranidae.
