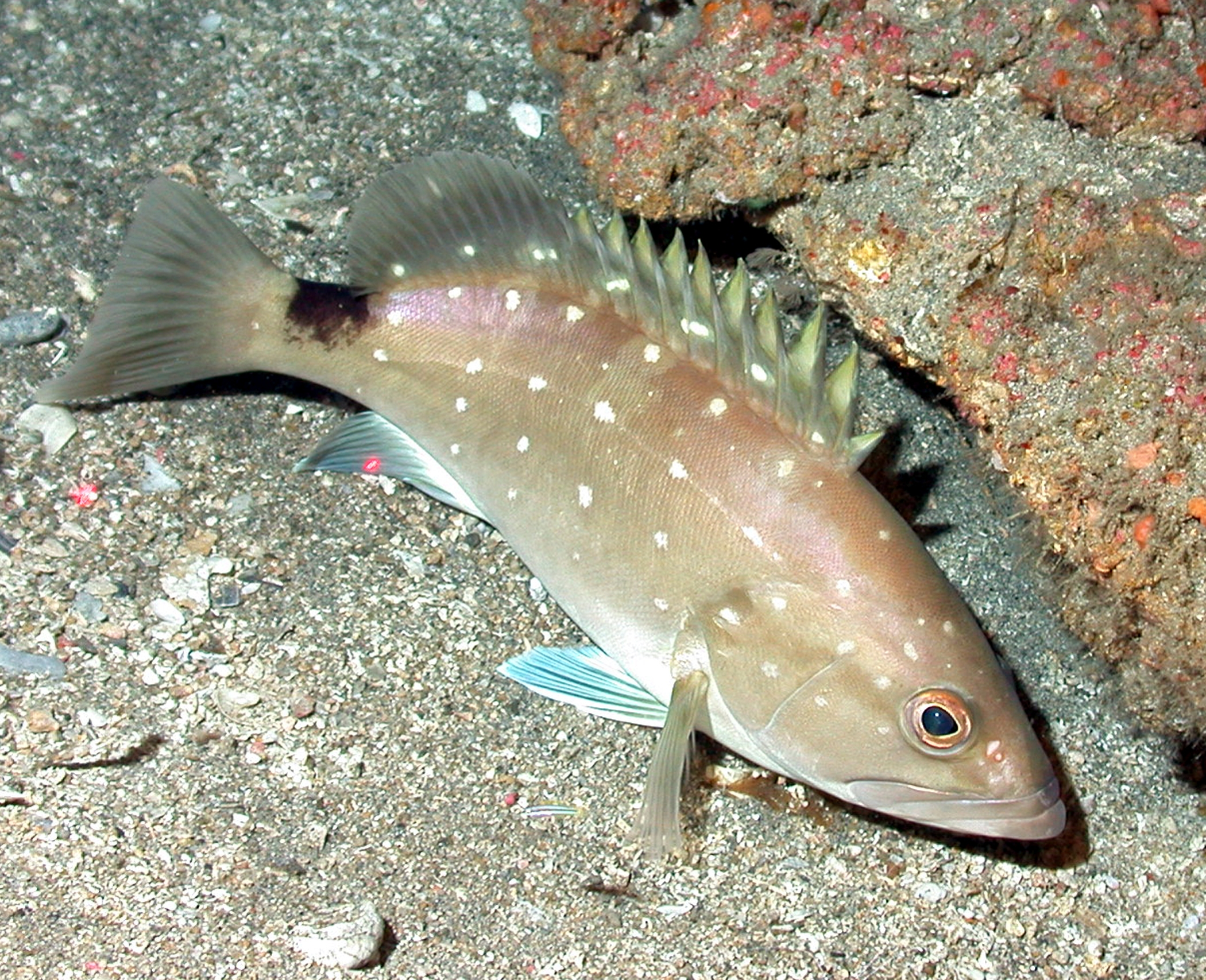
- Hyporthodus niveatus

Scientific classification
- Kingdom: Animalia
- Phylum: Chordata
- Class: Actinopterygii
- Division: Teleostei
- Order: Perciformes
- Family: Epinephelidae
- Genus: Hyporthodus; Gill, 1861

Type species
- Hyporthodus flavicauda Gill, 1861

Synonyms
- Schistorus Gill, 1862; Serrihastaperca Fowler, 1944

= Hyporthodus =

Genus of fishes

Hyporthodus is a genus of marine, ray-finned fish, groupers of the family Epinephelidae.

== Taxonomy ==
In 2007, genetic analyses showed that the genus Epinephelus was paraphyletic. As such, the genus Hyporthodus was resurrected, under which many species of Epinephelus were subsequently reclassified.

Genetic analysis shows that the monospecific genus Triso is nested within Hyporthodus and should be reclassified under the latter, however, reclassification has not yet been accepted by authorities such as Eschmeyer's Catalog of Fishes.

== Description ==
Compared to groupers of the related genus Epinephelus, Hyporthodus species are characterized by having a deeper body, and are drab brown or olive in coloration. The one exception to this H. drummondhayi.

== Species ==
It contains the following species, most of which were previously placed in Epinephelus:

- Hyporthodus acanthistius (Gilbert, 1892)
- Hyporthodus chabaudi (Castelnau 1861)
- Hyporthodus cifuentesi (Lavenberg & Grove, 1993)
- Hyporthodus darwinensis (J. E. Randall & Heemstra, 1991) (Darwin grouper)
- Hyporthodus drummondhayi (Goode & Bean, 1878)
- Hyporthodus ergastularius (Whitley, 1930)
- Hyporthodus exsul (Fowler, 1944)
- Hyporthodus flavolimbatus (Poey, 1865)
- Hyporthodus griseofasciatus Moore, Wakefield, DiBattista & Newman, 2022
- Hyporthodus haifensis (Ben-Tuvia, 1953)
- Hyporthodus mystacinus (Poey, 1852)
- Hyporthodus nigritus (Holbrook, 1855)
- Hyporthodus niphobles (Gilbert & Starks, 1897)
- Hyporthodus niveatus (Valenciennes, 1828)
- Hyporthodus octofasciatus (Griffin, 1926)
- Hyporthodus perplexus (Randall, Hoese & Last, 1991)
- Hyporthodus quernus (Seale, 1901)
- Hyporthodus septemfasciatus (Thunberg, 1793)

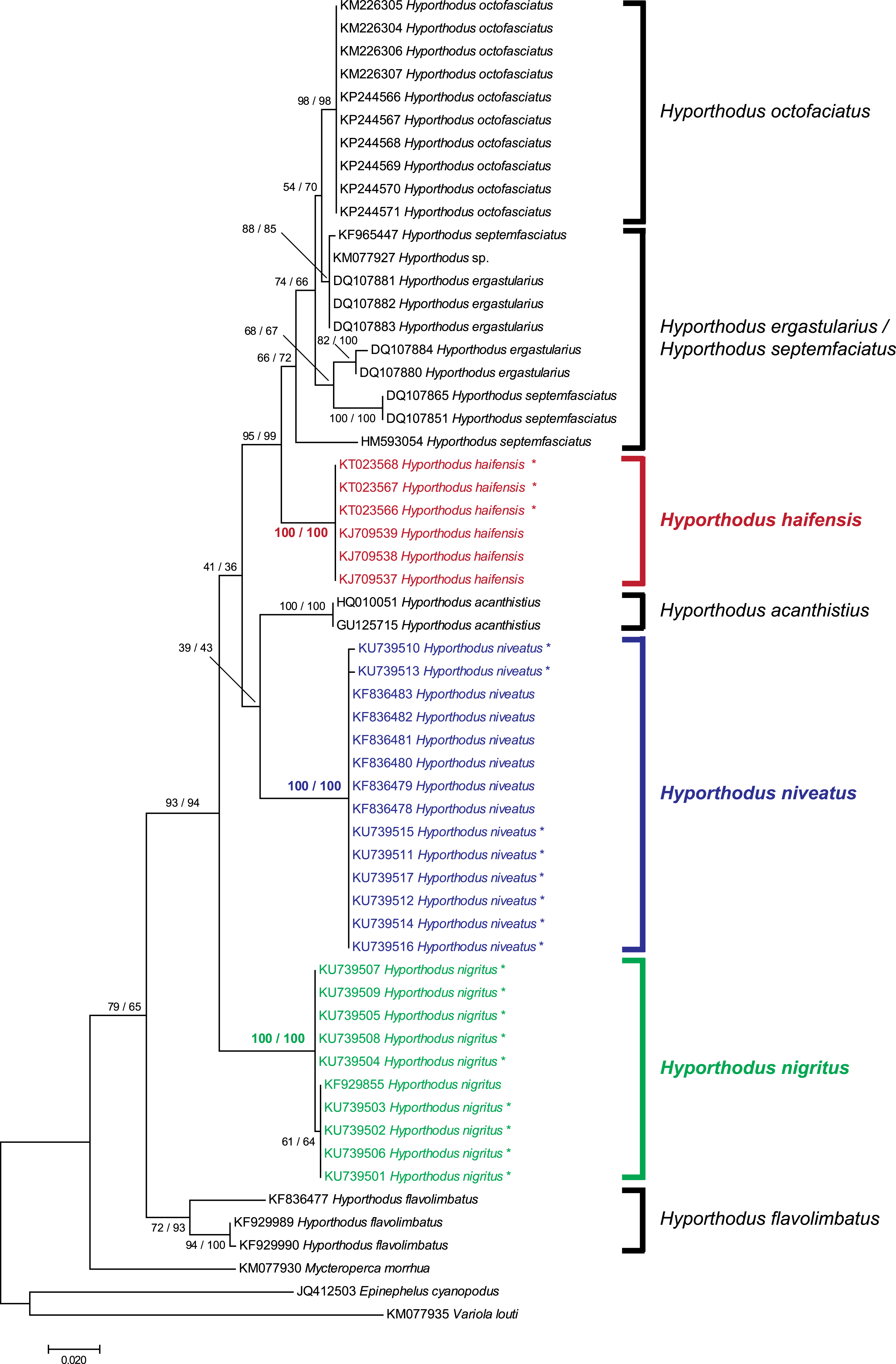
Phylogenetic tree of Hyporthodus species based on COI barcoding sequences

A molecular analysis has shown that most species of Hyporthodus can be identified on the basis of COI barcoding sequences.
