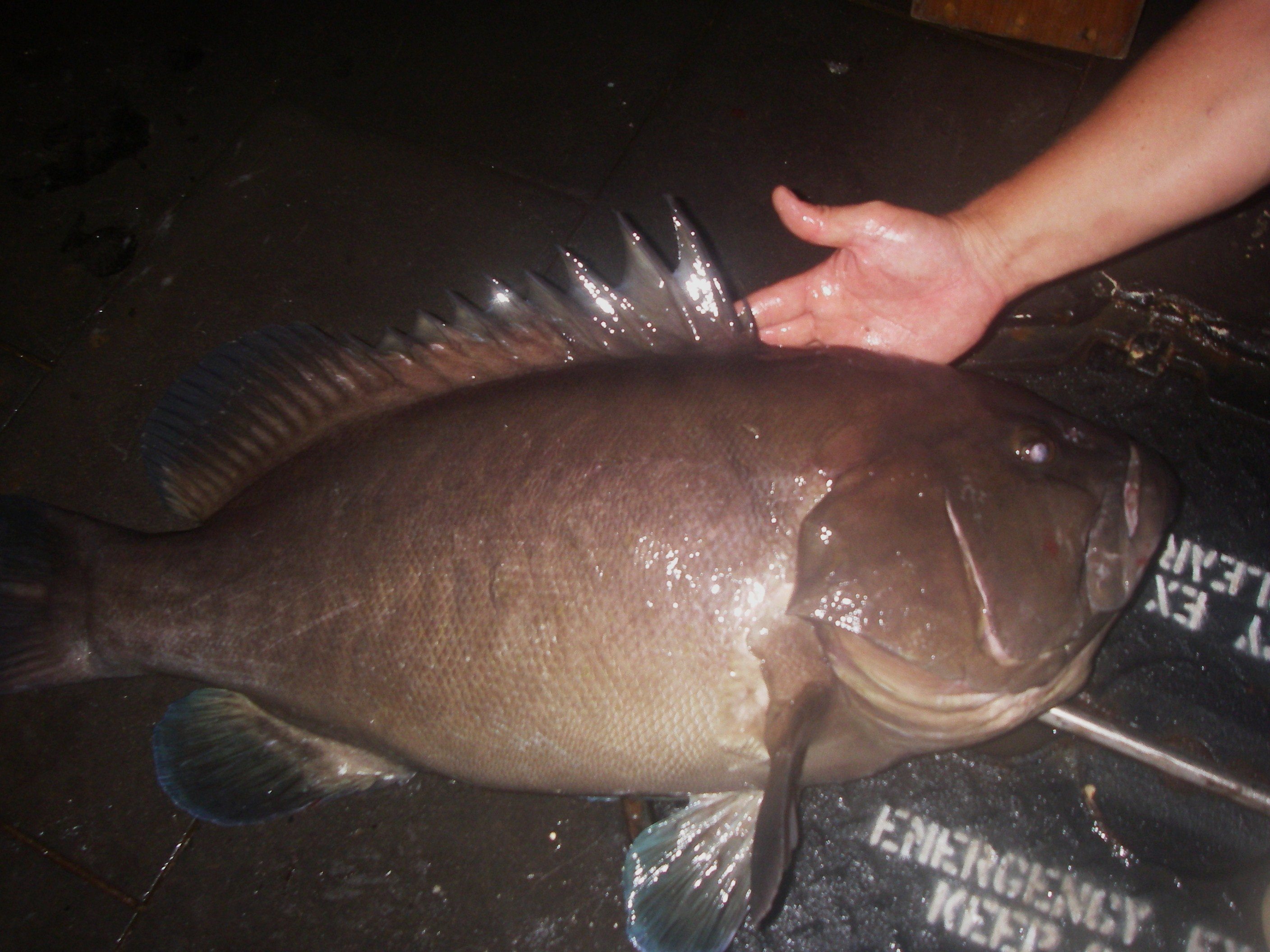

Conservation status
- Near Threatened (IUCN 3.1)

Scientific classification
- Kingdom: Animalia
- Phylum: Chordata
- Class: Actinopterygii
- Order: Perciformes
- Family: Epinephelidae
- Genus: Hyporthodus
- Species: H. nigritus

Binomial name
- Hyporthodus nigritus (Holbrook, 1855)

Synonyms
- Serranus nigritus Holbrook, 1855; Epinephelus nigritus (Holbrook, 1855); Garrupa nigrita (Holbrook, 1855); Centropristis merus Poey, 1868

= Hyporthodus nigritus =

Species of fish

Hyporthodus nigritus, the Warsaw grouper, is a species of marine, ray-finned fish, a grouper from the subfamily Epinephelinae, which is part of the family Serranidae, which also includes the anthias and sea basses. It is found in the Western Atlantic from Massachusetts to the Gulf of Mexico, Cuba, Trinidad, and south to Brazil (Rio de Janeiro). Its natural habitats are open and shallow seas, subtidal aquatic beds, and coral reefs. It is threatened by habitat loss.

The Warsaw grouper is a US National Marine Fisheries Service species of concern, which are those species about which the National Oceanic and Atmospheric Administration and National Marine Fisheries Service have some concerns regarding status and threats, but for which insufficient information is available to indicate a need to list the species under the Endangered Species Act.

== Description ==
H. nigritus is classified as a deep-water grouper, since it inhabits reefs on the continental shelf break in waters 180 to 1700 ft (55 to 525 m) deep; juveniles are occasionally seen on jetties and shallow-water reefs. They are the only grouper with 10 dorsal spines. They are dark reddish-brown or brownish-grey to almost black in color dorsally, and dull reddish-grey ventrally. They can very well exceed 8 ft in length. A 350-pound (160 kg) specimen was aged at over 50 years by biologists with Florida's Fish and Wildlife Research Institute. The specimen was caught on December 29, 2019.

== Conservation ==
H. nigritus is threatened by fishing or by catch-release mortality (due to pressure change). Fishing is primarily by hook-and-line and bottom longlines, though the species is caught incidentally in the deepwater snapper/grouper commercial fishery. Almost all of the catch is in the Gulf of Mexico. The IUCN rates it near threatened and the American Fisheries Society lists it as endangered.
