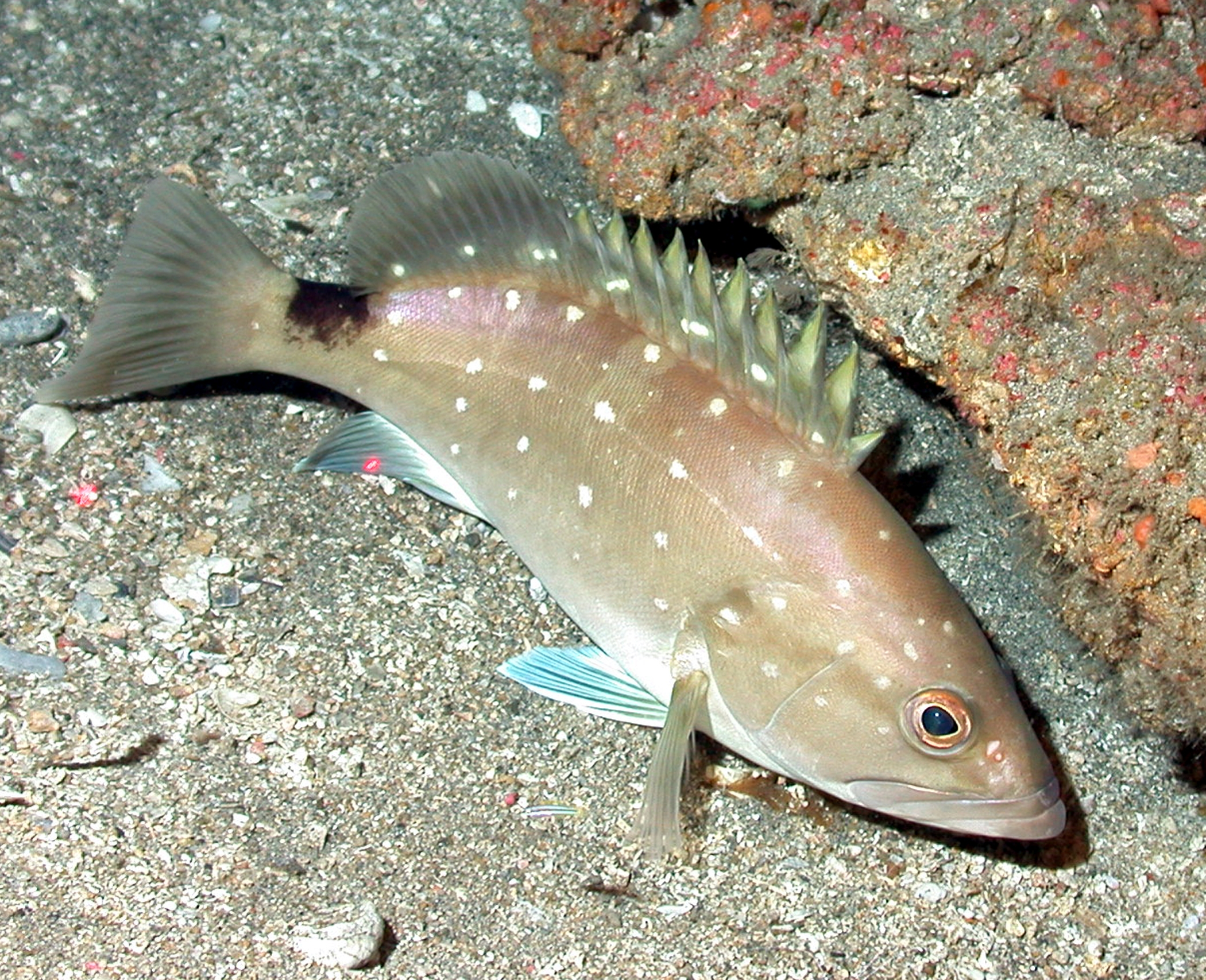

Conservation status
- Vulnerable (IUCN 3.1)

Scientific classification
- Kingdom: Animalia
- Phylum: Chordata
- Class: Actinopterygii
- Division: Teleostei
- Order: Perciformes
- Family: Epinephelidae
- Genus: Hyporthodus
- Species: H. niveatus

Binomial name
- Hyporthodus niveatus (Valenciennes, 1828)

Synonyms
- List: Serranus niveatus Valenciennes, 1828; Epinephelus niveatus (Valenciennes, 1828); Serranus margaritifer Günther, 1859; Serranus conspersus Poey, 1860; Hyporthodus flavicauda Gill, 1861; Alphestes scholanderi Walters, 1957

= Snowy grouper =

Species of fish

The snowy grouper (Hyporthodus niveatus) is a species of marine ray-finned fish, a grouper from the subfamily Epinephelinae which is part of the family Serranidae, which also includes the anthias and sea basses. It is found in the western Atlantic Ocean.

== Taxonomy ==
The snowy grouper was first formally described as Serranus niveatus in 1828 by the French zoologist Achille Valenciennes (1794-1865) with the type locality given as Brazil. In 1861 Theodore Nicholas Gill described a new species Hyporthodus flavicauda and placed it in its own monotypic genus, Hyporthodus although this was later shown to be a synonym of Serranus niveatus, this means that Serranus niveatus is the type species of this genus.

== Distribution ==
The snowy grouper occurs in the western Atlantic Ocean. It is found around Bermuda and along the eastern coast of the United States from Virginia south into the Gulf of Mexico and the Caribbean Sea. Its range extends along the coasts of Central America and South America from Mexico to the Valdes Peninsula in Argentina. It has been recorded as far north as Massachusetts.

== Description ==
Juvenile, in New Jersey

The snowy grouper has a robust, compressed, oval body which has its deepest point at the origin of dorsal fin. Its standard length is 2.4 to 2.8 times longer than its depth. The preopercle has a serrated edge and the serrations at its angle are enlarged, where there is also often a spine bent upwards, clothed in skin and located on its lower edge immediately in front of its angle. The upper edge of the gill cover is notably convex. There are 11 spines and 13-15 soft rays in the dorsal fin while the anal fin contains 3 spines and 9 soft rays. The membranes between the dorsal fin spines have deep notches. The caudal fin has a rear margin which is convex in juveniles of standard lengths less than 30 centimetres (12 in) and is straight or concave in adults.

The overall colour is dark brown with a black margin to the spiny part of the dorsal fin. Juveniles are dark brown and are marked with obvious white spots arranged in vertical rows on the rear part of the head and on the body. These extend onto the dorsal fin and like adults they have a black margin to the spiny part of the dorsal fin while the caudal and pectoral fins are yellow to clear. The upper part of the base of the caudal fin has a deep black saddle-like mark that extends underneath the lateral line.

This species attains a maximum published total length of 122 centimetres (48 in), although are more commonly around 60 centimetres (24 in), and a maximum published weight of 30 kilograms (66 lb).

== Habitat ==
In South Carolina

The snowy grouper is found at depths of between 10 and 525 metres (33 and 1,722 ft) over rock substrates in offshore waters, although they are most common between 100 and 200 metres (330 and 660 ft). The juveniles are found in shallower, coastal waters and are frequently found along the northeastern coast of the United States.

== Biology ==
Like most groupers this species is predatory and prey items recorded for adults include fishes, gastropods, cephalopods, and brachyuran crustaceans.

=== Reproduction ===
They are protogynous hermaphrodites and form aggregations for spawning. Females attain sexual maturity at ages between 3 and 5 years old and total lengths of 45.1 to 57.5 centimetres (17.8 to 22.6 in), changing to males 3 to 4 years after attaining sexual maturity as females. Off North America this species spawns from May to June and a female may lay more than 2 million eggs in a season.

== Utilisation ==
The snowy grouper is targeted by commercial fisheries in the United States, in Central America and off South America using hook-and-line, bottom longlines, traps and trawls. In United States waters the snowy grouper may be fished for from 1 January to 31 August but as its management includes an annual catch limit, the fishery may be closed if this limit has been met or is projected to be met. In 2019 the fishery was closed on 3 August.
