= Hortulus =

Latin: Hortulus may refer to:

- Hortulus, a book on gardening by the 9th-century monk Walafrid Strabo
- Hortulus Animae (English: Little Garden of the Soul, German: Seelengärtlein, French: Jardin des Âmes)
- 4323 Hortulus (1981 QN), a main-belt asteroid that was discovered on 1981 by Paul Wild at Zimmerwald

== See also ==
- Hortulia
- Corallus hortulanus cooki
- Corallus hortulanus, a non-venomous snake species found in South America
- Halichoeres hortulanus, a species of fish
- Ortolan
