= Corallus batesii =

Conservation status
- Least Concern (IUCN 3.1)

Scientific classification
- Kingdom: Animalia
- Phylum: Chordata
- Class: Reptilia
- Order: Squamata
- Suborder: Serpentes
- Family: Boidae
- Genus: Corallus
- Species: C. batesii

Binomial name
- Corallus batesii (Gray, 1860)

Synonyms
- Chrysenis batesii Gray, 1860; Corallus caninus (part) — Boulenger, 1893; Boa canina (part) — Amaral, 1925; Corallus caninus (part) — J.A. Peters & Orejas-Miranda, 1970; Corallus batesii — Henderson, 2009; Corallus batesii — Wallach, 2014

Species of snake

Corallus batesii, also known commonly as the Amazon Basin emerald tree boa, is a species of snake in the subfamily Boinae of the family Boidae. The species is native to the tropical rainforests of South America. This species was revalidated from the synonymy of Corallus caninus by Henderson and colleagues in 2009.

== Taxonomy and etymology ==
English naturalist John Edward Gray originally described this species as Chrysenis batesii in 1860. The specific name, batesii, is in honor of Henry Walter Bates, an English naturalist and explorer, for whom Batesian mimicry is also named.

== Description ==
The Amazon Basin emerald tree boa has a yellow belly. The dorsum is dark green with an enamel-white vertebral stripe, which has confluent partial crossbars, often bordered by some black spots. C. batesii differs from C. caninus by the shape and the number of scales across the snout. C. batesii is bigger than C. caninus, growing to a total length (including tail) approaching 9 feet (2.7 m).

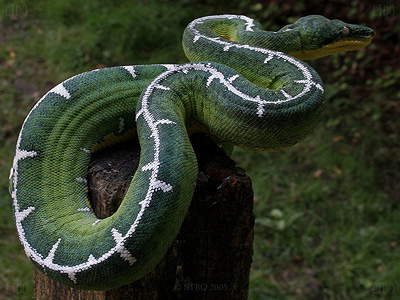
White stripe on the back of the Emerald Tree Boa

== Behavior ==
Corallus batesii is arboreal, and it is both diurnal and nocturnal.

== Diet ==
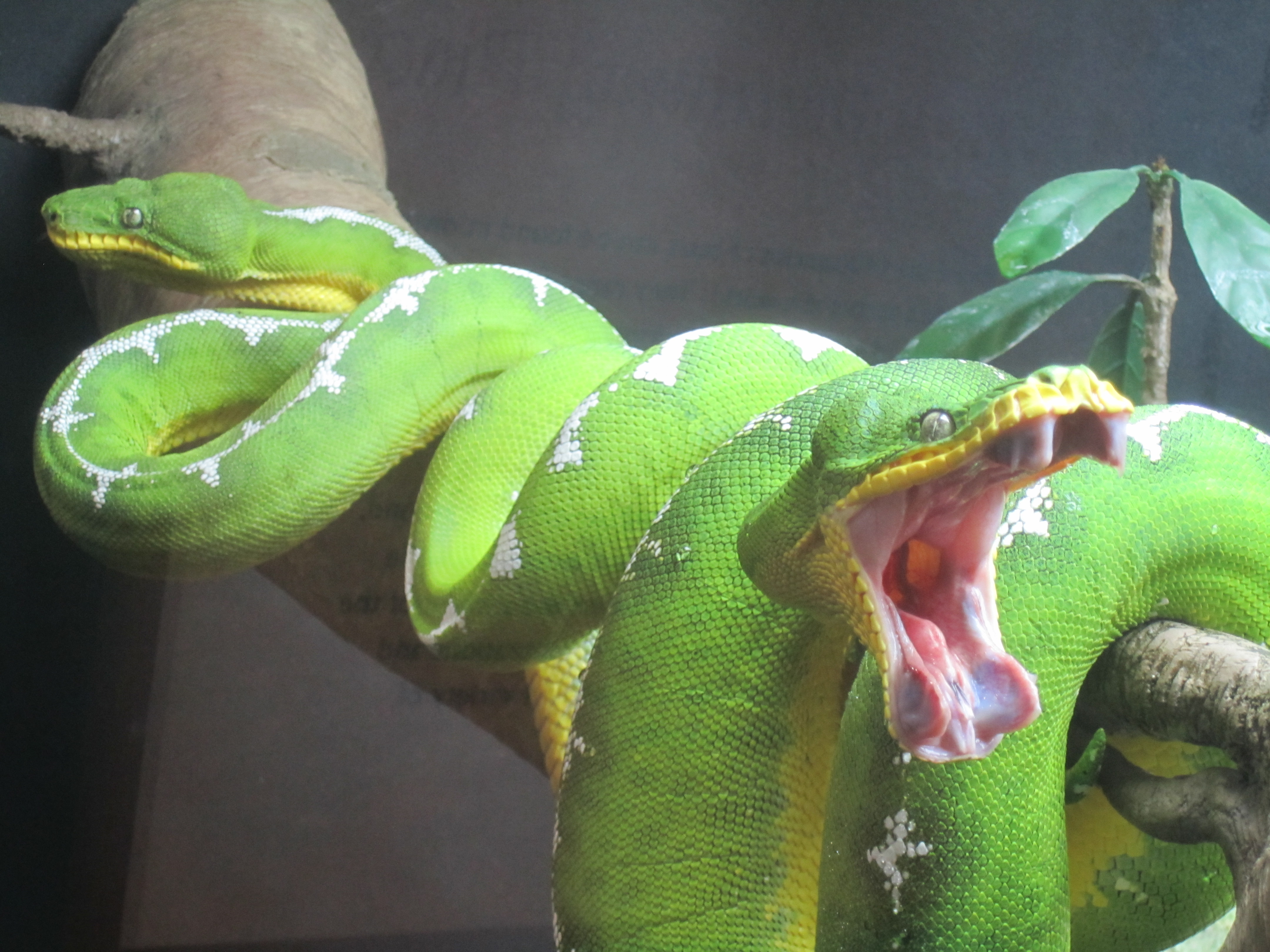
Amazon Basin emerald tree boas in the living collections of the North Carolina Museum of Natural Sciences in Raleigh, North Carolina, pictured shortly after feeding

Corallus batesii is capable of hunting small airborne prey, such as bats and birds, as well as rodents, opossums, lizards (including Thecadactylus solimoensis), and other snakes (including Bothrops atrox) as well as Tarantulas such as the Goliath Birdeater.

== Reproduction ==
Corallus batesii is ovoviviparous.

== Geographic range and habitat ==
Corallus batesii, the "Amazon Basin species", as the common name suggests, is only found in the basin of the Amazon River, in southern Suriname, southern Venezuela to Colombia, Ecuador, Peru and Brazil and in the surrounding jungles of the Amazon River. It is found at elevations from sea level to 1,000 m (3,300 ft).
