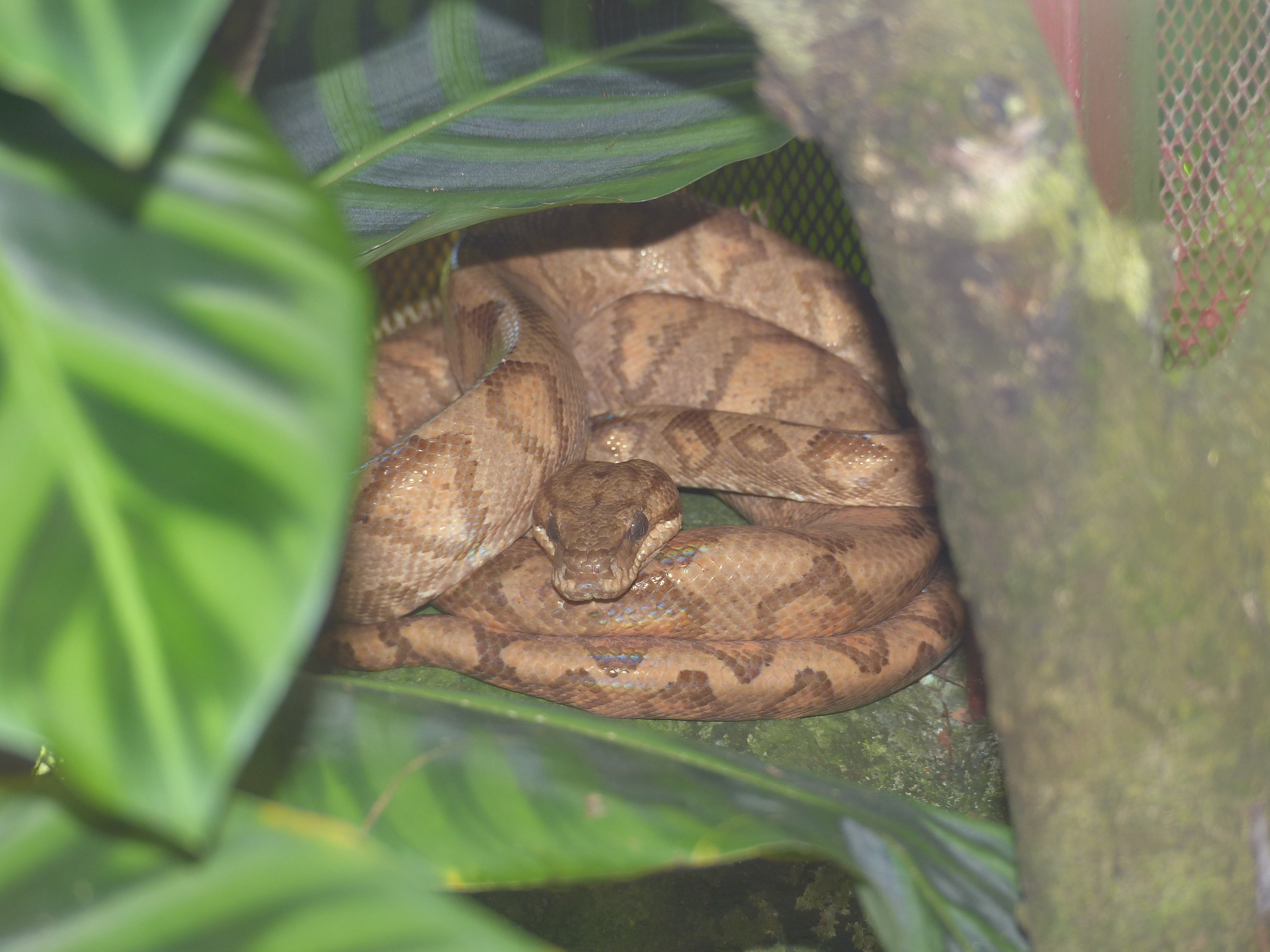

Conservation status
- Least Concern (IUCN 3.1)

Scientific classification
- Domain: Eukaryota
- Kingdom: Animalia
- Phylum: Chordata
- Class: Reptilia
- Order: Squamata
- Suborder: Serpentes
- Family: Boidae
- Genus: Corallus
- Species: C. annulatus

Binomial name
- Corallus annulatus (Cope, 1875)

Synonyms
- Xiphostoma annulatum - Cope, 1875; Corallus annulatus - Boulenger, 1893; Boa annulata [annulata] - Rendahl & Vestergren, 1940; [Corallus] a[nnulata]. annulata - Peters, 1957; Corallus annulatus annulatus - Peters & Orejas-Miranda, 1970

= Corallus annulatus =

Species of snake

Corallus annulatus, known as the ringed tree boa, annulated tree boa, and northern annulated tree boa, is a boa species found in Central and South America. Three subspecies are currently recognized, including the nominate subspecies described here. Like all boas, it is a non-venomous constrictor.

== Description ==
The color pattern consists of a brownish-red ground color overlaid with blackish rings or netlike reticulations.

== Geographic range ==
Found in Central America in eastern Guatemala, Honduras, Nicaragua, Costa Rica, Panama. Also in South America in Pacific Colombia and northwestern Ecuador. The type locality given is "Costa Rica."

== Subspecies ==
Subspecies	Taxon author	Common name	Geographic range
C. a. annulatus	(Cope, 1875)	northern annulated tree boa
C. a. colombianus	(Rendahl & Vestergren, 1940)	Colombian annulated tree boa
