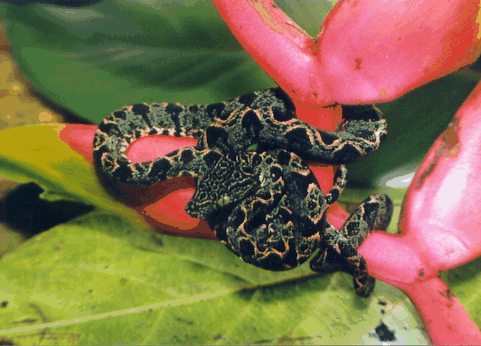
- Amazon tree boa, C. hortulanus

Scientific classification
- Kingdom: Animalia
- Phylum: Chordata
- Class: Reptilia
- Order: Squamata
- Suborder: Serpentes
- Family: Boidae
- Subfamily: Boinae
- Genus: Corallus; Daudin, 1803

Type species
- Corallus obtusirostris Daudin, 1803

Synonyms
- Xiphosoma Wagler, 1824; Chrysenis Gray, 1860; Xenoboa Hoge, 1953

= Corallus =

Corallus Temporal range: Paleocene to recent

Genus of snakes

Corallus, the neotropical tree boas, are a genus of boas found in Central America, South America and the West Indies. Nine extant species are recognized as of 2017.

== Description ==
All members of this genus are long, slightly flattened laterally and have thin bodies with large heads. They typically have relatively large eyes, although this is less pronounced in the larger species, such as the emerald tree boa, Corallus caninus. The anterior teeth are highly elongated, often being several times the length one would expect for snakes of their size. These are used for penetrating layers of feathers to get a firm grip on birds, their primary prey. All members of the genus are nocturnal and have large numbers of very pronounced thermoreceptive pits are located between the labial scales.

== Distribution and habitat ==
Species in the genus Corallus are found in Central America, South America and the West Indies. In Central America they occur in Honduras, eastern Guatemala through Nicaragua, Costa Rica and Panama. The range of the genus in South America includes Pacific Colombia and Ecuador, as well as the Amazon Basin from Colombia, Ecuador, Peru and northern Bolivia through Brazil to Venezuela, Isla Margarita, Trinidad, Tobago, Guyana, Suriname and French Guiana. In the West Indies it is found on St. Vincent, the Grenadines (Bequia Island, Ile Quatre, Baliceaux, Mustique, Canouan, Maryeau, Union Island, Petit Martinique and Carriacou), Grenada and the Windward Islands (Lesser Antilles).

== Species ==
As of 2017, nine species are recognized in this genus. C. annulatus was formerly treated as a subspecies of C. annulatus but is now treated as a species in its own right.

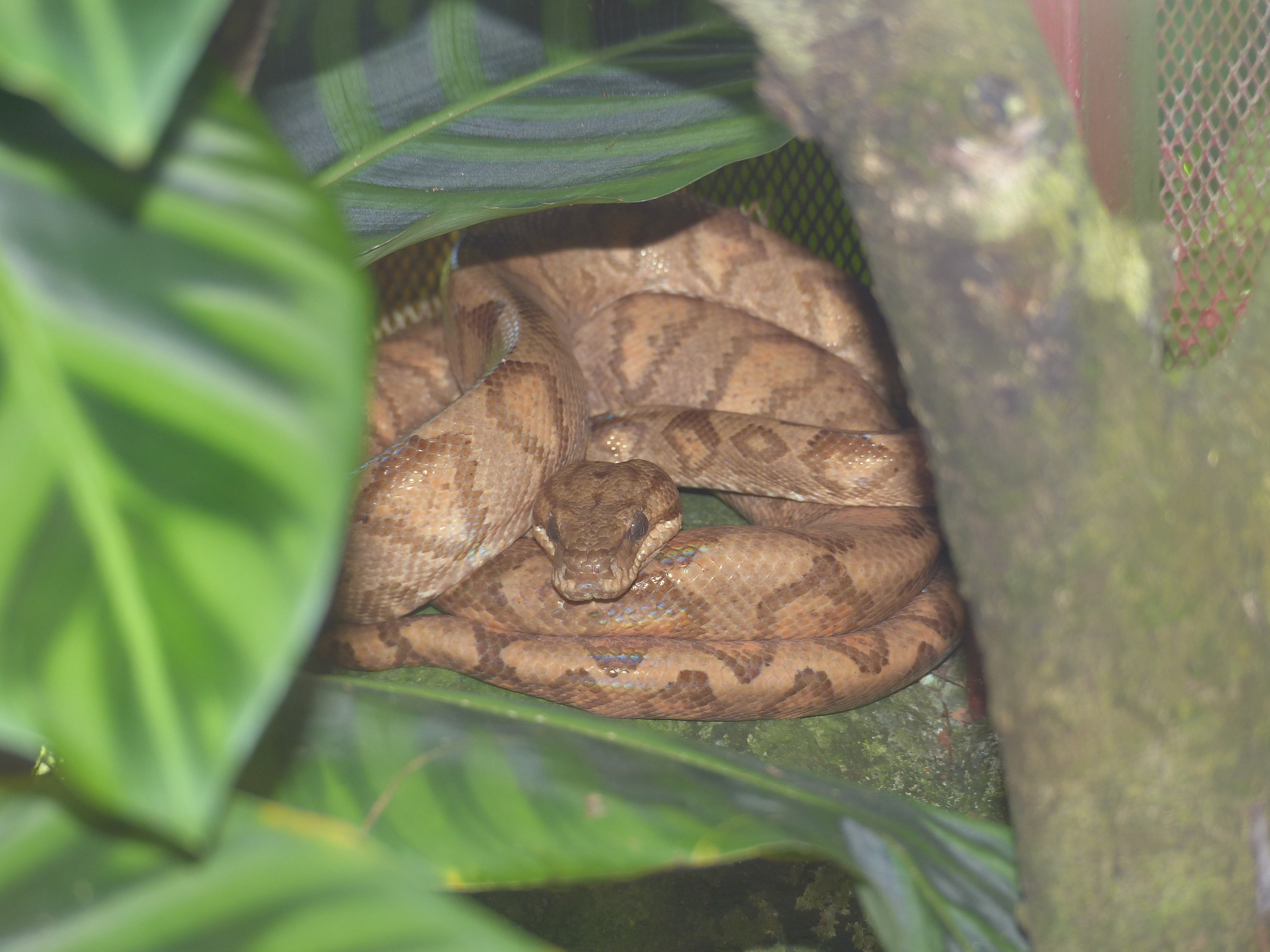
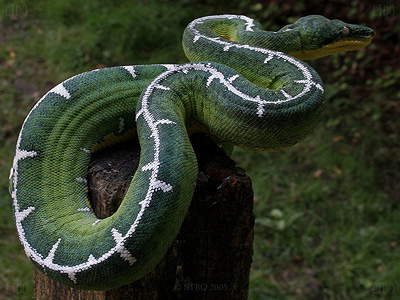
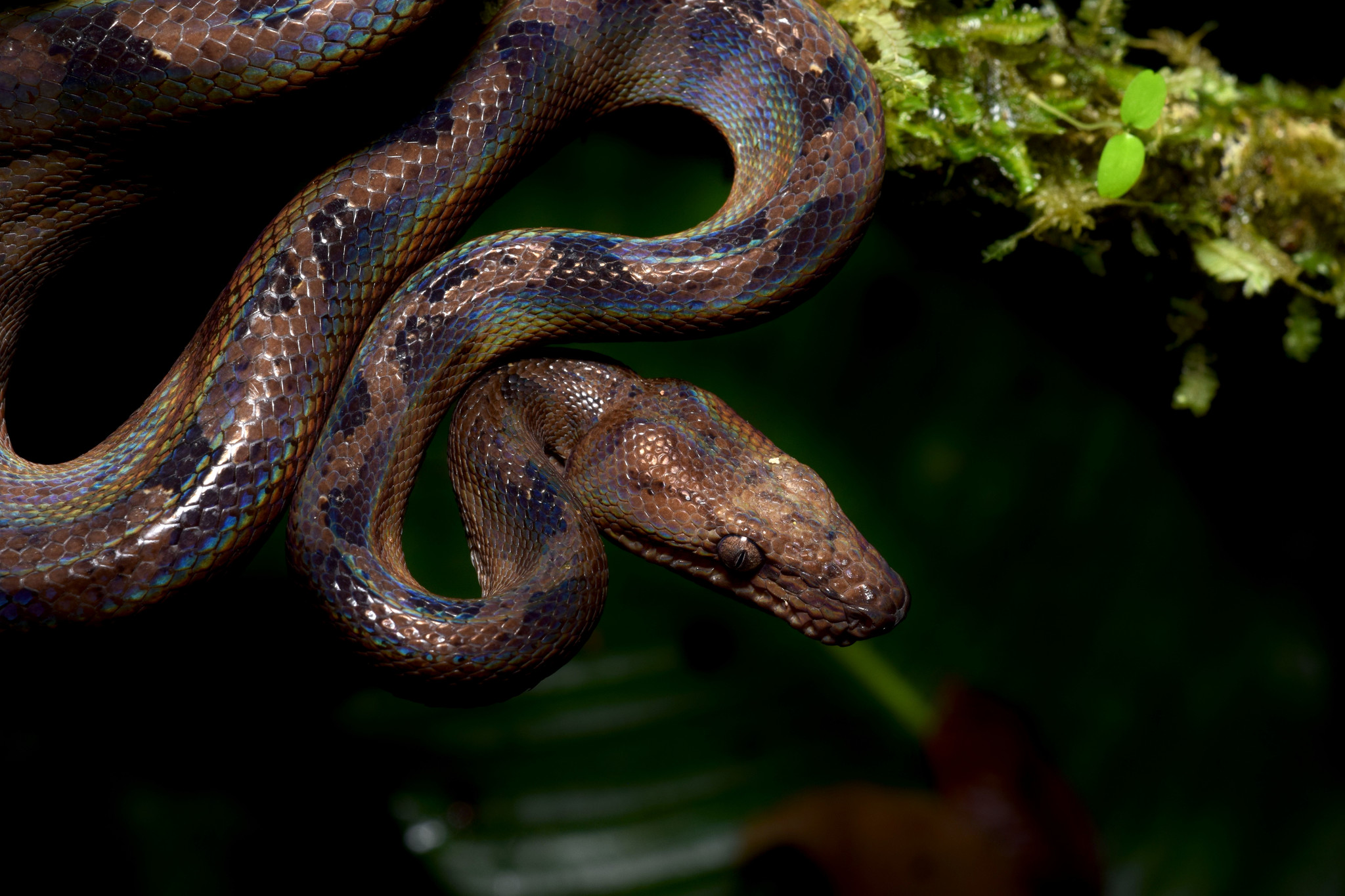
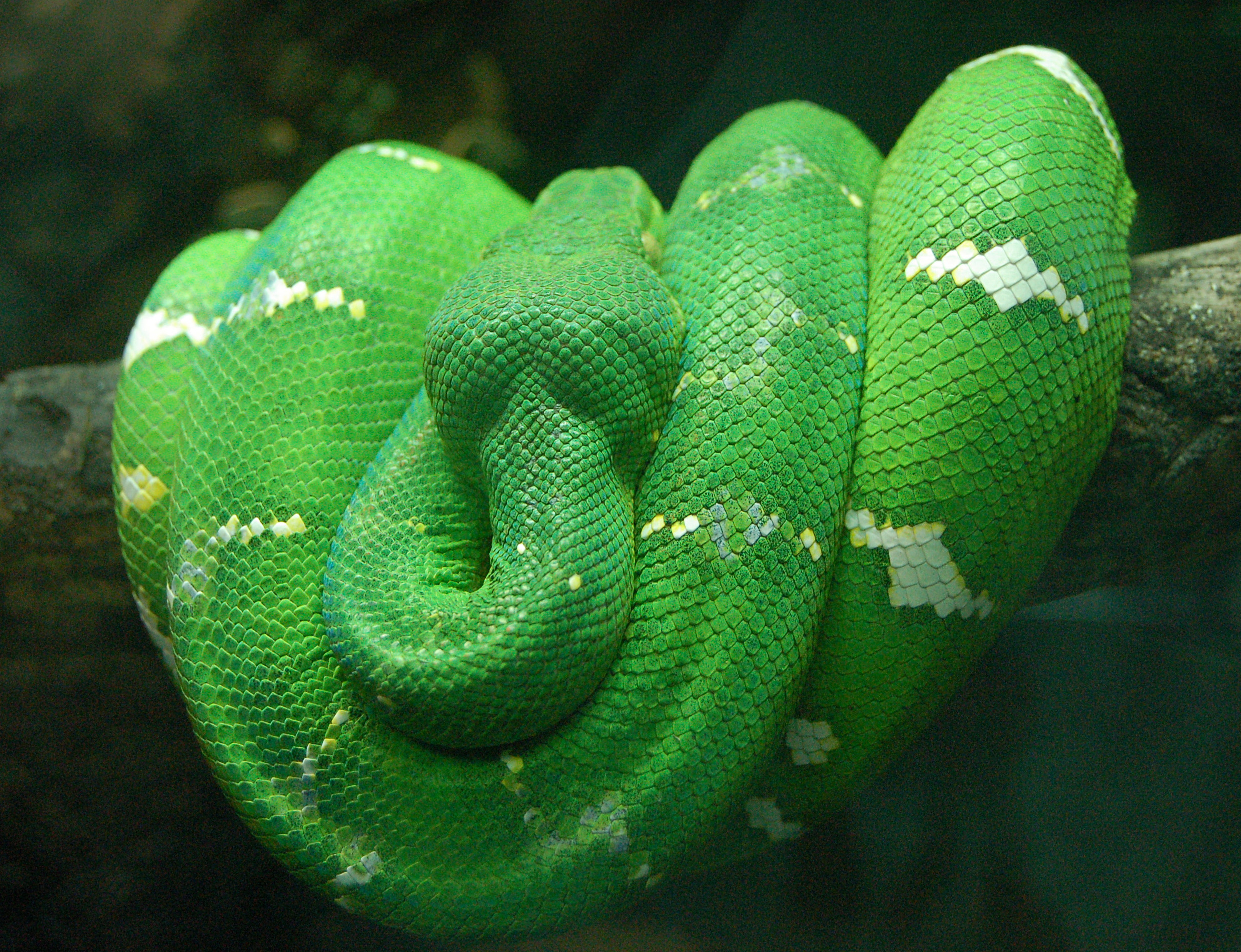
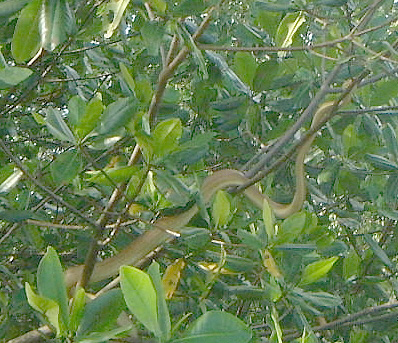
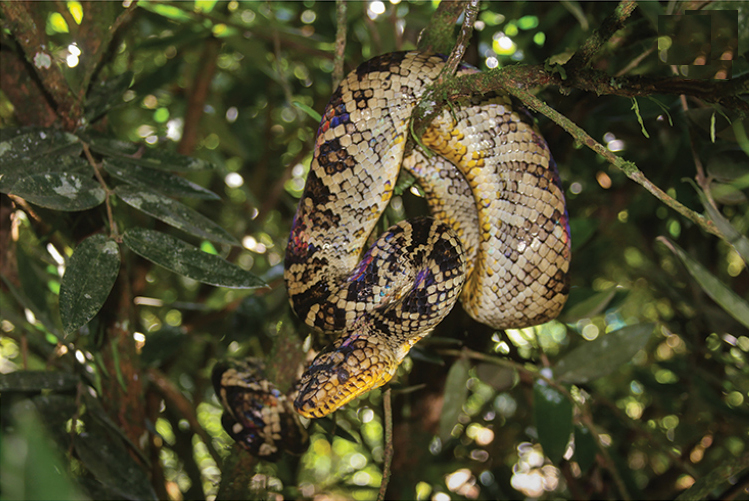
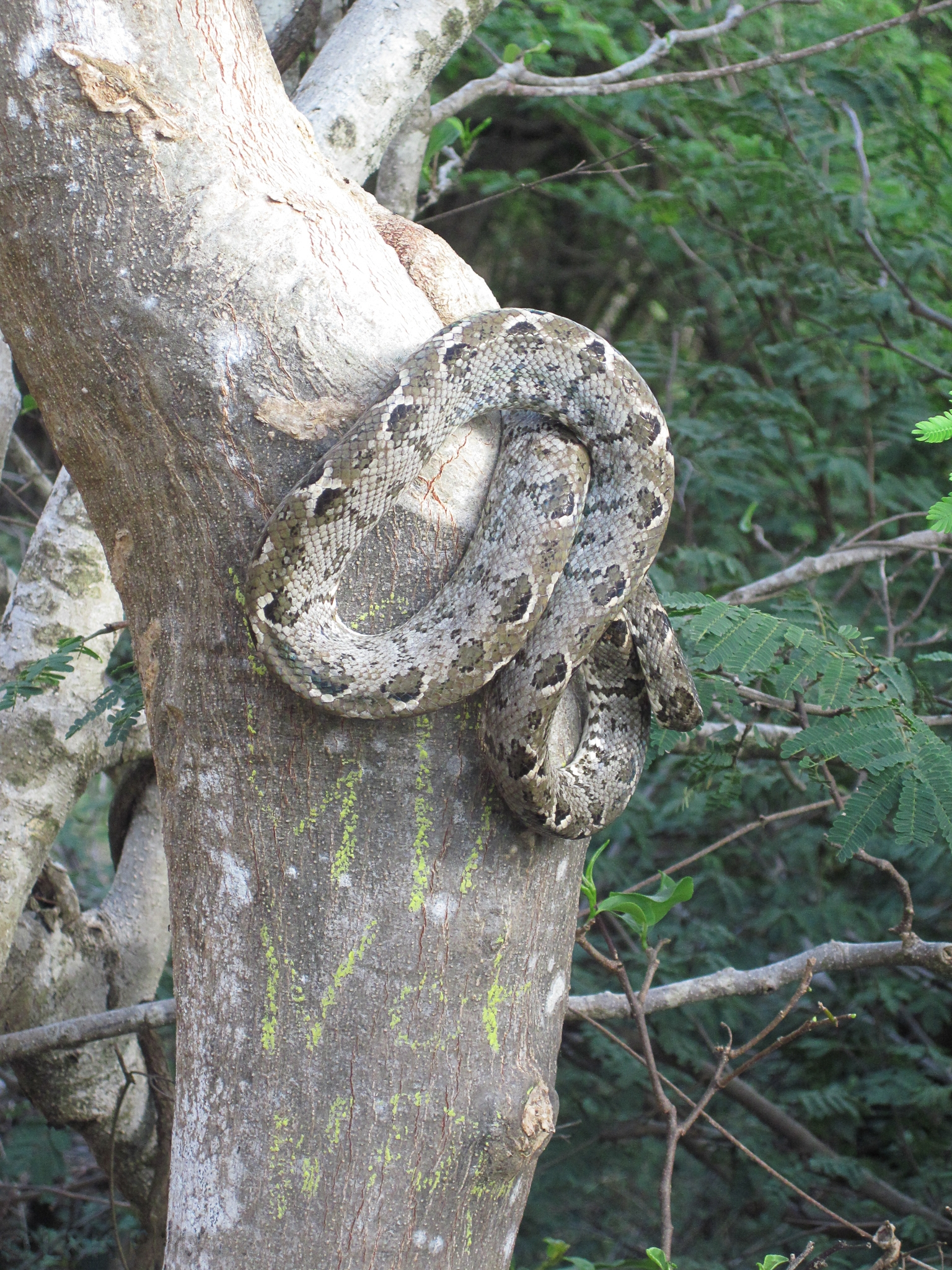
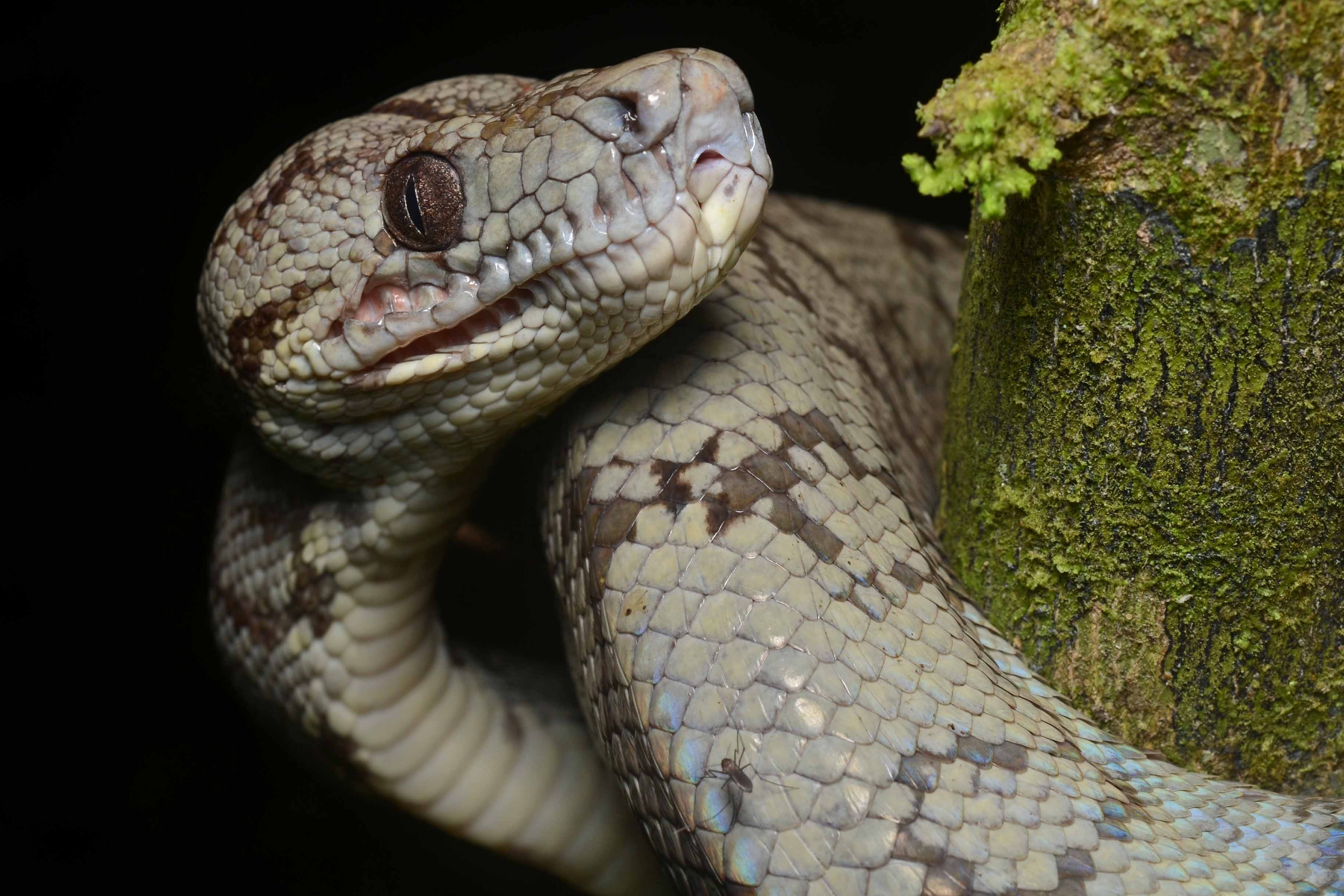
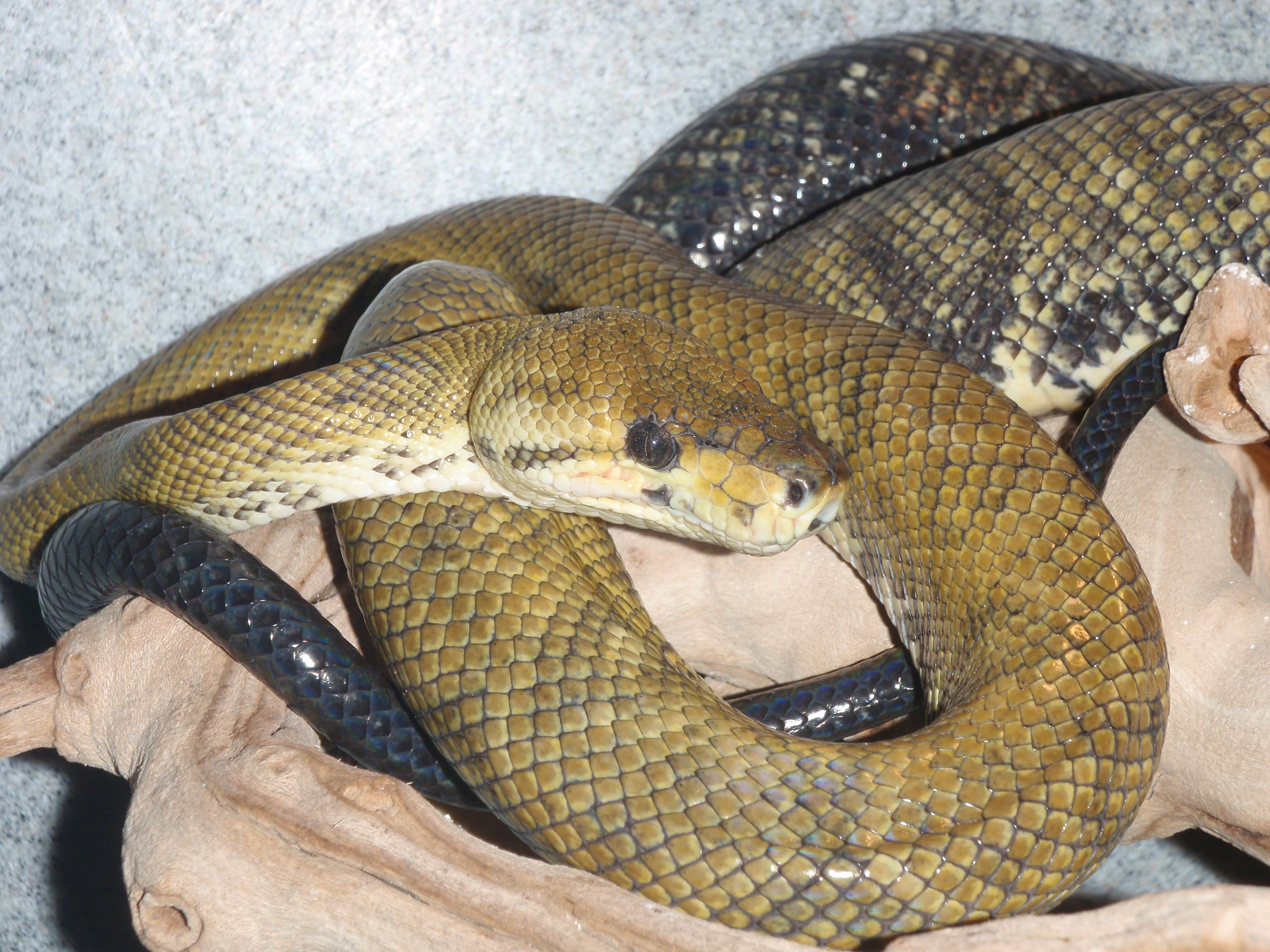
Species	Taxon author	Subsp.*	Common name	Geographic range	Image
C. annulatus	(Cope, 1875)	0	Ringed tree boa	Central America in eastern Guatemala, Honduras, Nicaragua, Costa Rica, Panama. Also in South America in Pacific Colombia and northwestern Ecuador.
C. batesii	(Gray, 1860)	0	Amazon Basin emerald tree boa	South America in the Amazon Basin region of Colombia, Ecuador, Peru, northern Bolivia, and Brazil.
C. blombergi	(Rendahl and Vestergren, 1941)	0	Blomberg's tree boa	Ecuador, Colombia (Nariño)
C. caninus	(Linnaeus, 1758)	0	Emerald tree boa	South America in the Guiana Shield region of Colombia, and from Venezuela to the Guianas.
C. cookii	(Gray, 1842)	0	Cook's tree boa	St. Vincent (West Indies).
C. cropanii	(Hoge, 1953)	0	Cropani's tree boa	Miracatu, São Paulo, Brazil.
C. grenadensis	(Barbour, 1914)	0	Grenada Bank tree boa	The Grenadines: Bequia Island, Ile Quatre, Baliceaux, Mustique, Canouan, Maryeau, Union Island and Carriacou and Grenada.
C. hortulana^{T}	(Linnaeus, 1758)	0	Amazon tree boa	South America in southern Colombia east of the Andes, southern Venezuela, Guyana, Suriname, French Guiana, Amazonian Brazil, Ecuador, Peru and Bolivia.
C. ruschenbergerii	(Cope, 1876)	0	Central American tree boa	Lower Central America in southwestern Costa Rica (south of 10° N) and Panama, including Isla del Rey, Isla Contadora, Isla de Cébaco and Isla Suscantupu. South America in Colombia east of the Andes, north of the Cordillera Central and north of the Cordillera Oriental, northern Venezuela north of the Cordillera de Mérida and in the drainage of the Río Orinoco, north and west of the Guiana Shield, east of the Orinoco Delta. Also on Isla Margarita, Trinidad and Tobago.

- ) Not including the nominate subspecies.

^{T}) Type species.

== Captivity ==
Two species of Corallus are frequently imported as pets, the Amazon tree boa, C. hortulanus, and the emerald tree boa, C. caninus. Most, if not all, have an aggressive demeanor and will strike readily. Their stunning coloration makes them popular, but their specialized habitat and feeding make them suitable only for advanced keepers. Captive bred specimens are much more docile than their wild caught counterparts.

== Extinct species ==
A fossil species, †Corallus priscus, was described in Brazil in 2001.
