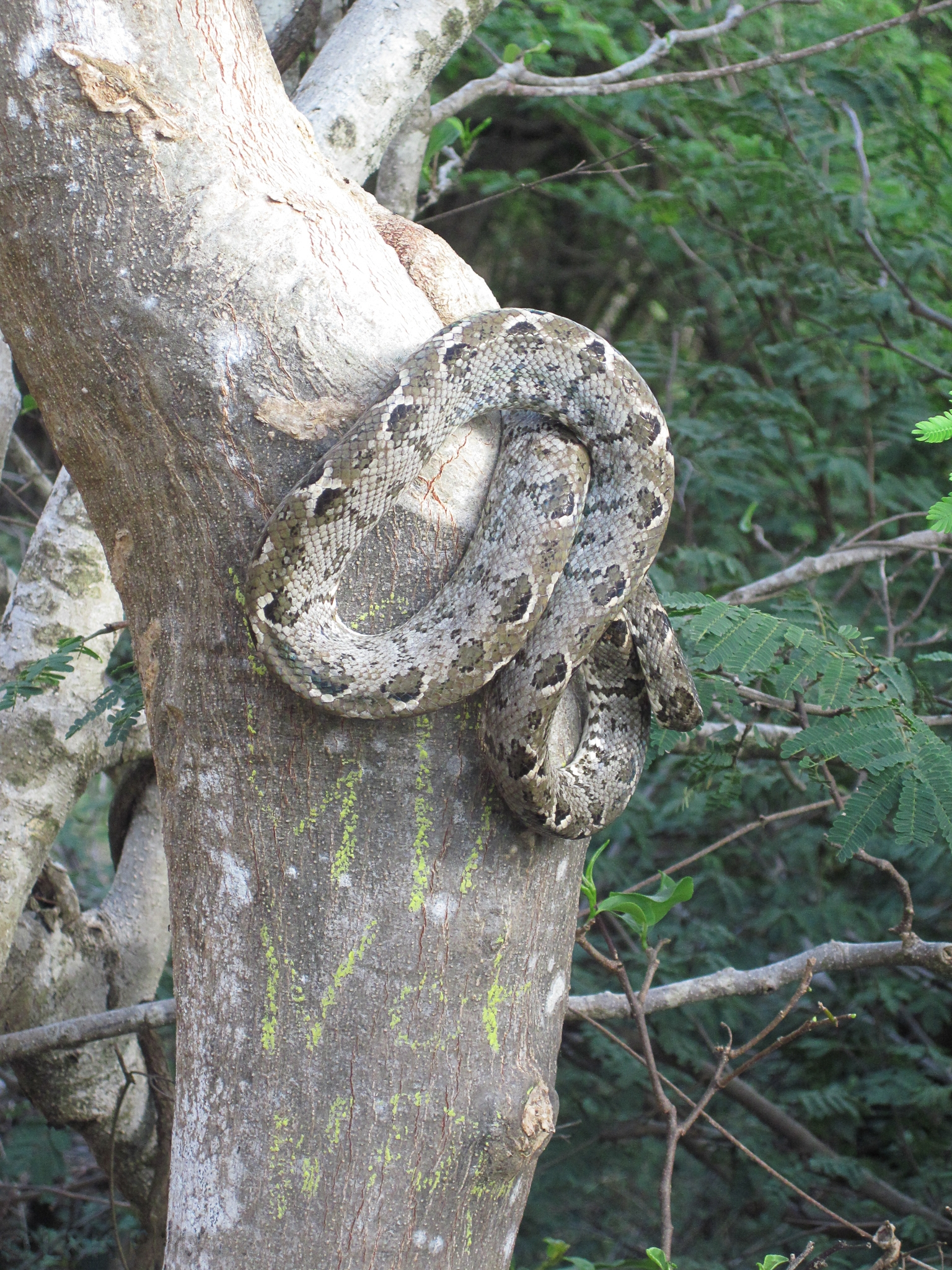

Conservation status
- Least Concern (IUCN 3.1)

Scientific classification
- Kingdom: Animalia
- Phylum: Chordata
- Class: Reptilia
- Order: Squamata
- Suborder: Serpentes
- Family: Boidae
- Genus: Corallus
- Species: C. grenadensis

Binomial name
- Corallus grenadensis (Barbour, 1914)

Synonyms
- Boa grenadensis Barbour, 1914; Corallus grenadensis (Barbour, 1914)

= Corallus grenadensis =

Species of snake

Corallus grenadensis, known commonly as the Grenada tree boa or Grenada Bank tree boa, is a species of snake in the family Boidae. The species is endemic to the southern Windward Islands, being found only in Grenada and Saint Vincent and the Grenadines.

== Taxonomy ==
The first description of Corallus grenadensis was published in 1914 by Thomas Barbour, who used the name Boa grenadensis for it. Barbour's usage of this name was a matter of placing the species into the genus Boa, but rather using the name as a synonym for Corallus, as he explicitly stated that his choice to use Boa instead of Corallus was per the 1901 (Note: Barbour cites it as "Stejneger, Proc. U.S. nat. mus. 1902, 24, p.184"; the full volume 24 of Proceedings of the United States Natural Museum was completed and published in 1902, but Stejneger's contribution to it was originally published 8 October 1901.) example set by Leonhard Stejneger, who contended that Corallus was correctly referred to as Boa, while Boa should instead be known as Constrictor. Barbour and Arthur Loveridge recategorized grenadensis as a subspecies of Corallus cookii in 1929, under the name Boa cookii grenadensis. The nomenclature advocated for by Stejneger and adopted by Barbour did not end up as the one used by the wider community, with Constrictor considered being an objective junior synonym of Boa. Robert W. Henderson revived Barbour's Boa grenadensis as a species, but under the name Corallus grenadensis; The holotype of the species, a male was collected by G. M. Allen in August 1910, with the type locality being St. George's, the capital of Grenada.

== Description ==
C. grenadensis has 37–46 dorsal scale rows, 251–278 ventral scales, 100–119 subcaudal scales, 3–9 supraocular scales and 0–4 infraloreal scales.

The dorsal ground colouration of C. grenadensis has a wide range. Most individuals have a taupe ground dorsal colour, and the next most common is a yellowish one, with grey, brown and orange being less common; however, local conditions are correlated to how common each colour is, leading to different localities having different predominant colours. The ventral ground colour is a dull yellow in most individuals, with some having one closer to white. Ventral patterning varies from nearly covering the venter in a dark brown colour to being completely absent.

Most individuals have a spade-shaped dorsal pattern, with sharp edges on the spades being about twice as common as rounded edges are. Patterns other than spades are somewhat more common on Grenada and its surrounding islands than in the Grenadines. An exception to the pattern prevalent on most of the body is found near the head of the snake, where its diamond-shaped instead.

== Distribution ==
C. grenadensis is endemic to the Windward Islands. It is found on the island of Grenada, its surrounding islands and in the Grenadines. It is not found on Saint Vincent, which is inhabited by the endemic Corallus cookii, a close relative of C. grenadensis.

== Habitat ==
C. grenadensis is an arboreal species, and can be found in various habitats where the vegetation's crown foliage forms a continuous cover over the ground, including rainforest, dry forest, orchards, mangroves, shrublands with agave and cactus and mixed agriculture and residential areas. Its been found living at elevations of up to 530 m (1,740 ft).
