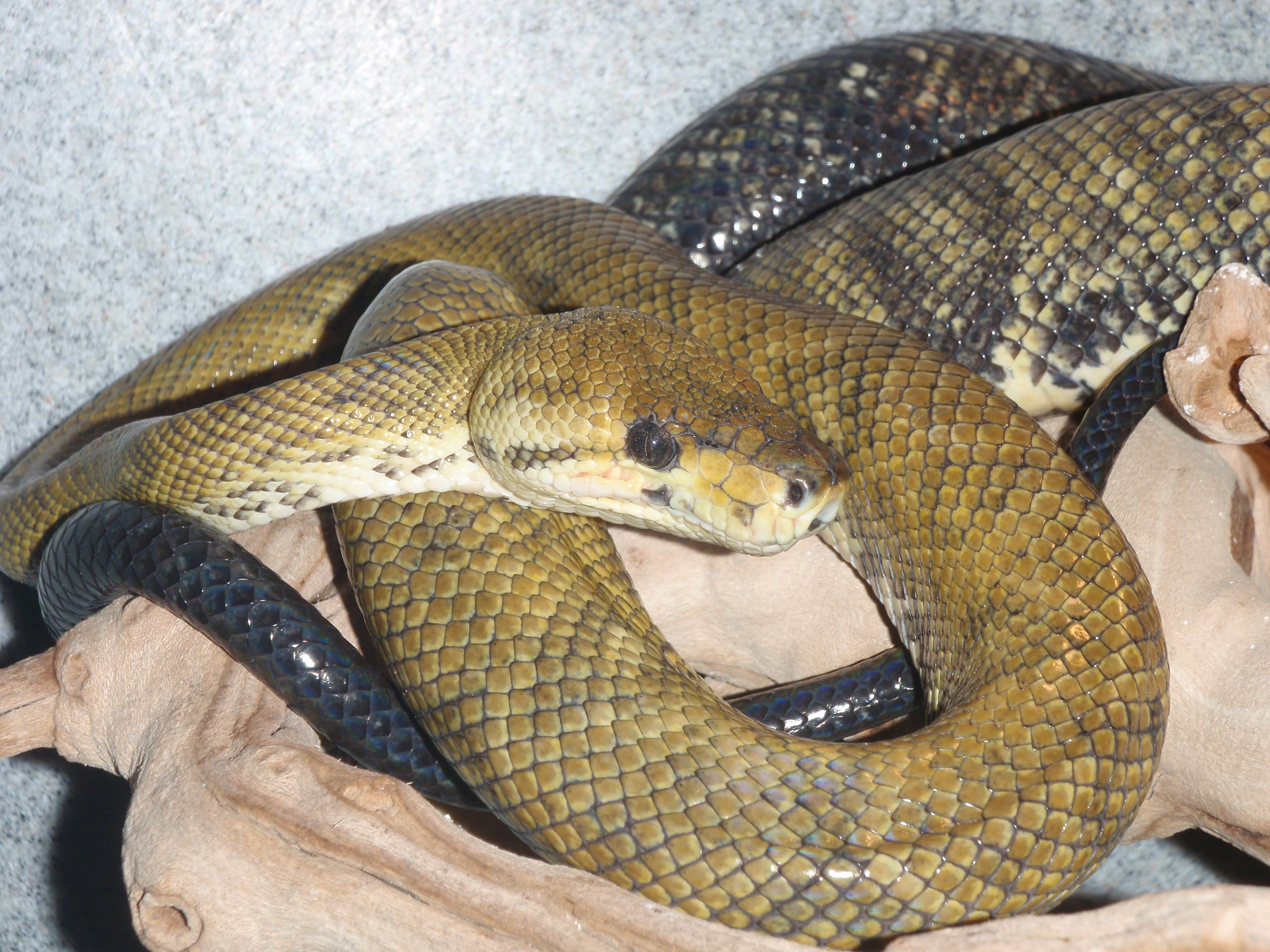

Conservation status
- Least Concern (IUCN 3.1)

Scientific classification
- Kingdom: Animalia
- Phylum: Chordata
- Class: Reptilia
- Order: Squamata
- Suborder: Serpentes
- Family: Boidae
- Genus: Corallus
- Species: C. ruschenbergerii

Binomial name
- Corallus ruschenbergerii (Cope, 1875)

Synonyms
- Xiphosoma ruschenbergerii Cope, 1875; Xiphosoma ruschenbergii [sic] Boulenger, 1893 (ex errore); Corallus cookei var. ruschenbergi — Boettger, 1898; Boa ruschenbergii — Stejneger, 1901; Boa salmonidia Briceño-Rossi, 1934; Corallus ruschenbergerii — Henderson, 1997

= Corallus ruschenbergerii =

Species of snake

Corallus ruschenbergerii, commonly known as the Central American tree boa, common tree boa, and Trinidad tree boa, is a boa species found in lower Central America and northern South America. No subspecies are currently recognized. Like all boas, it is not venomous.

== Etymology ==
The specific name, ruschenbergerii, is in honor of William Ruschenberger, who was a United States Navy surgeon.

== Description ==
Corallus ruschenbergerii is one of the largest members of the genus Corallus with adults reaching up to 2 metres (6 ft 7 in) in total length (including tail). The colors are typically shades of yellow, brown or gray, although populations on Trinidad and Tobago are often a patternless pure bronze.

== Geographic range ==
Corallus ruschenbergerii is found in Lower Central America in southwestern Costa Rica (south of 10° N) and Panama, including Isla del Rey, Isla Contadora, Isla de Cébaco and Isla Suscantupu. In South America it occurs in Colombia east of the Andes, north of the Cordillera Central and north of the Cordillera Oriental, northern Venezuela north of the Cordillera de Mérida and in the drainage of the Río Orinoco, north and west of the Guiana Shield, east of the Orinoco Delta. It is also found on Isla Margarita, Trinidad and Tobago. The type locality given is "Panama".

== Habitat ==
Corallus ruschenbergerii is a relatively common species found in wide range of habitats from near sea level to about 1,000 m (3,300 ft) above sea level: mangroves, riparian forests, wet and dry lowland forests, tree-lined savanna, and palm groves. It is nocturnal.

== Feeding ==
The primary diet of C. ruschenbergerii consists of rodents (such as squirrels, mice and porcupine rats) and other small mammals (such as bats, mouse opossums and introduced Javan mongoose), as well as lizards, frogs and birds.

== Captivity ==
Still fairly rare in captivity, C. ruschenbergerii is only recently becoming more common in the United States.
