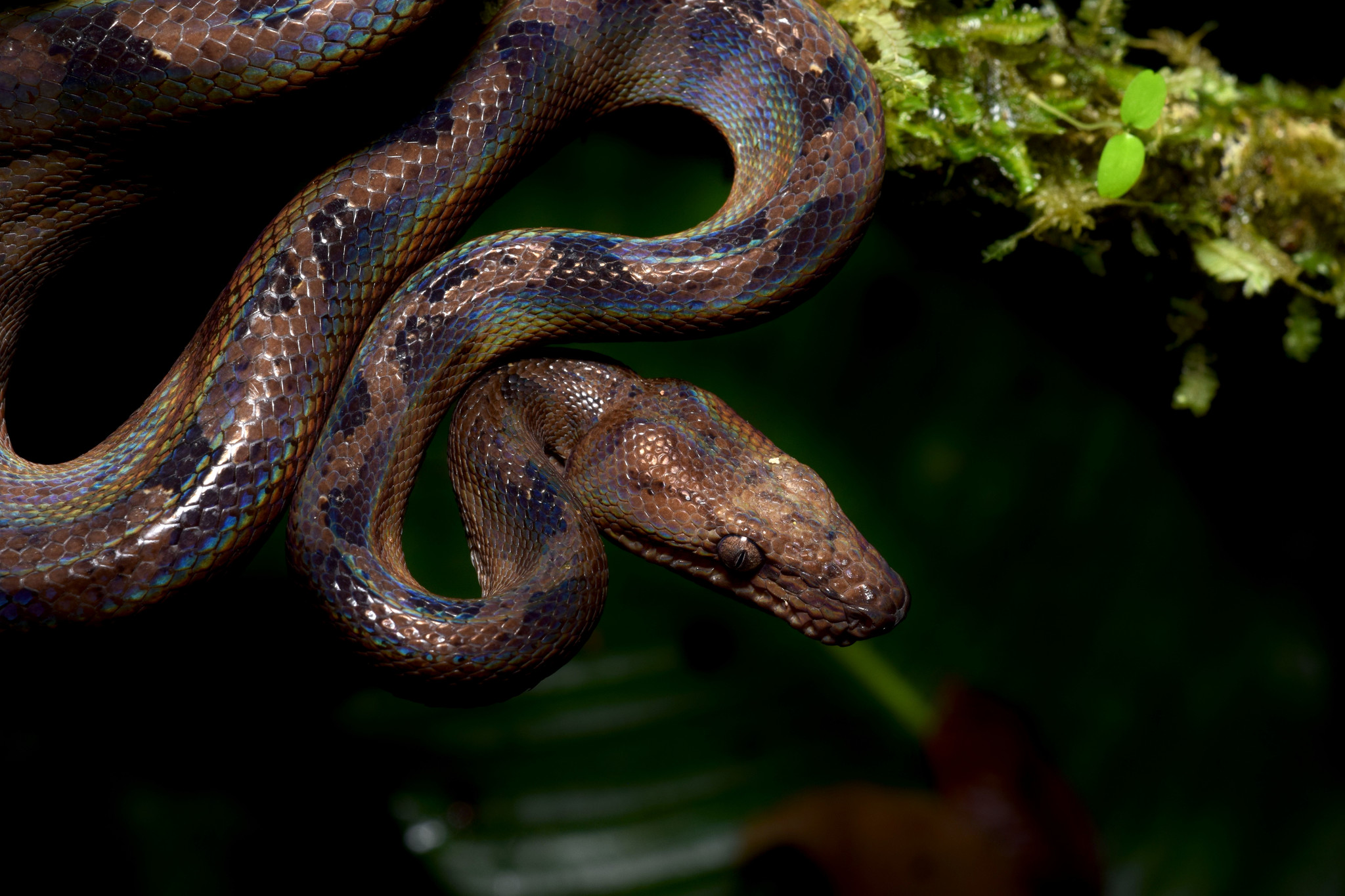

Conservation status
- Endangered (IUCN 3.1)

Scientific classification
- Kingdom: Animalia
- Phylum: Chordata
- Class: Reptilia
- Order: Squamata
- Suborder: Serpentes
- Family: Boidae
- Genus: Corallus
- Species: C. blombergi

Binomial name
- Corallus blombergi (Rendahl & Vestergren, 1940)

Synonyms
- Boa annulata blombergi - Rendahl & Vestergren, 1941; [Corallus annulata] blombergi - Peters, 1957; Corallus annulatus blombergi - Peters & Orejas-Miranda, 1970

= Corallus blombergi =

Species of snake

Corallus blombergi, the Ecuadorian annulated tree boa, is a boa species found in Pacific Ecuador.

== Description ==
Medium-sized, not much is known about its natural history.

== Diet ==
C. blombergi eats birds, rodents and bats (such as Carollia castanea).

== Taxonomy ==
Regarded as a full species, C. blombergi, by some experts, primarily due to its significantly different bone morphology, color and scalation.
