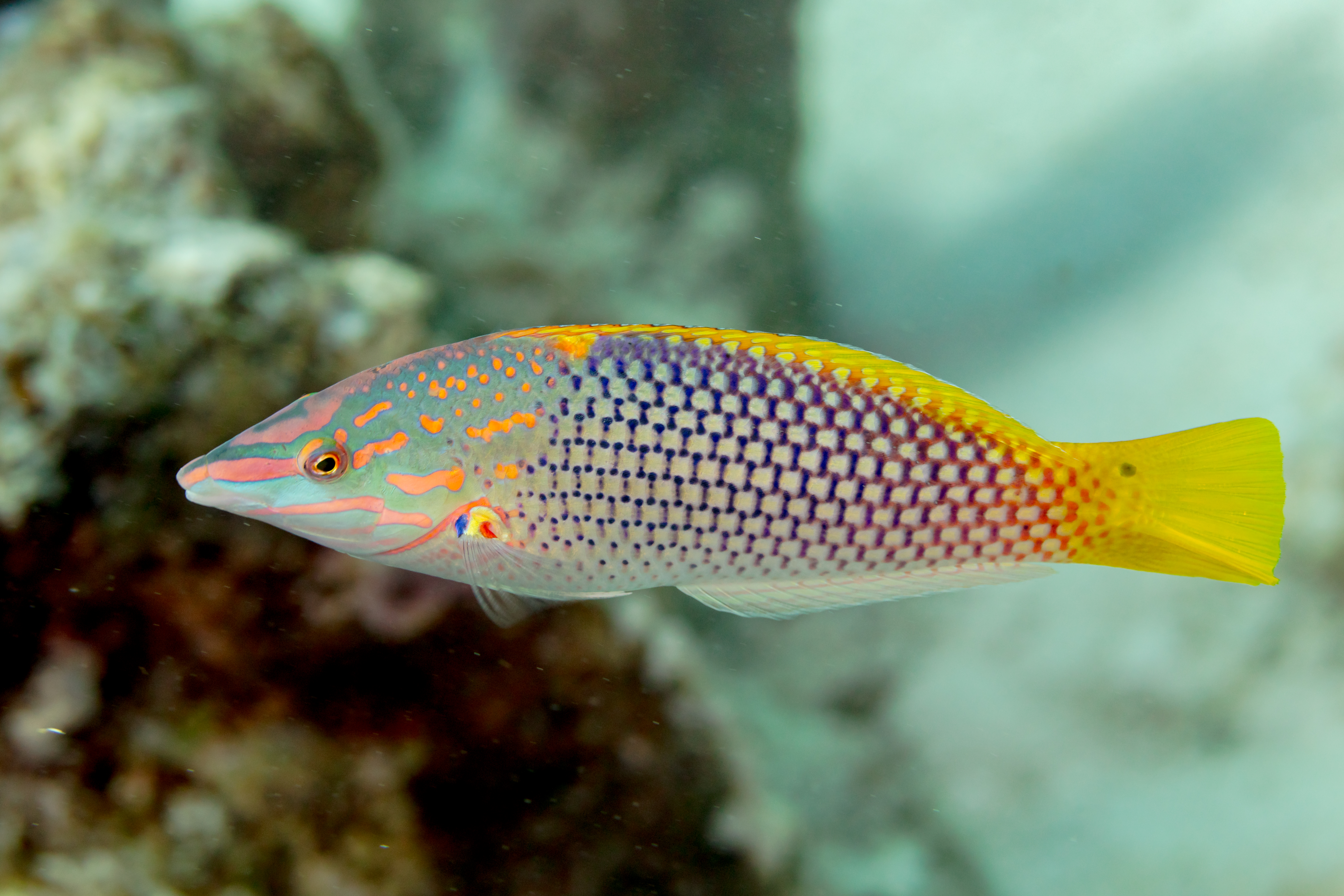

Conservation status
- Least Concern (IUCN 3.1)

Scientific classification
- Kingdom: Animalia
- Phylum: Chordata
- Class: Actinopterygii
- Order: Labriformes
- Family: Labridae
- Genus: Halichoeres
- Species: H. hortulanus

Binomial name
- Halichoeres hortulanus (Lacépède, 1801)

Synonyms
- Labrus hortulanus Lacépède, 1801; Labrus centiquadrus Lacépède, 1801; Halichoeres centiquadrus (Lacépède, 1801); Halichoeres hortulanus centiquadrus (Lacépède, 1801); Hemitautoga centiquadrus (Lacépède, 1801)

= Checkerboard wrasse =

Species of fish

The checkerboard wrasse (Halichoeres hortulanus) is a species of fish belonging to the wrasse family. It is native to the Indian Ocean and central Pacific Ocean.

== Description ==
The checkerboard wrasse is a small sized fish that can reach a maximum length of 33 centimetres (13 in). Both its sex and appearance change during its life, and the colouring at each stage is rather variable based on location. The body is thin, relatively lengthened and its mouth is terminal.

At juvenile stage, this wrasse has a white silvery background color with three black and dark red vertical patches from back head, middle of the body and on the caudal peduncle. A black ocellus with a yellow ring adorns the rear of the dorsal fin, two distinctive white spots are also visible on top and bottom of the caudal peduncle. Also a reddish line passes through the eyes starting from tip of the snout.

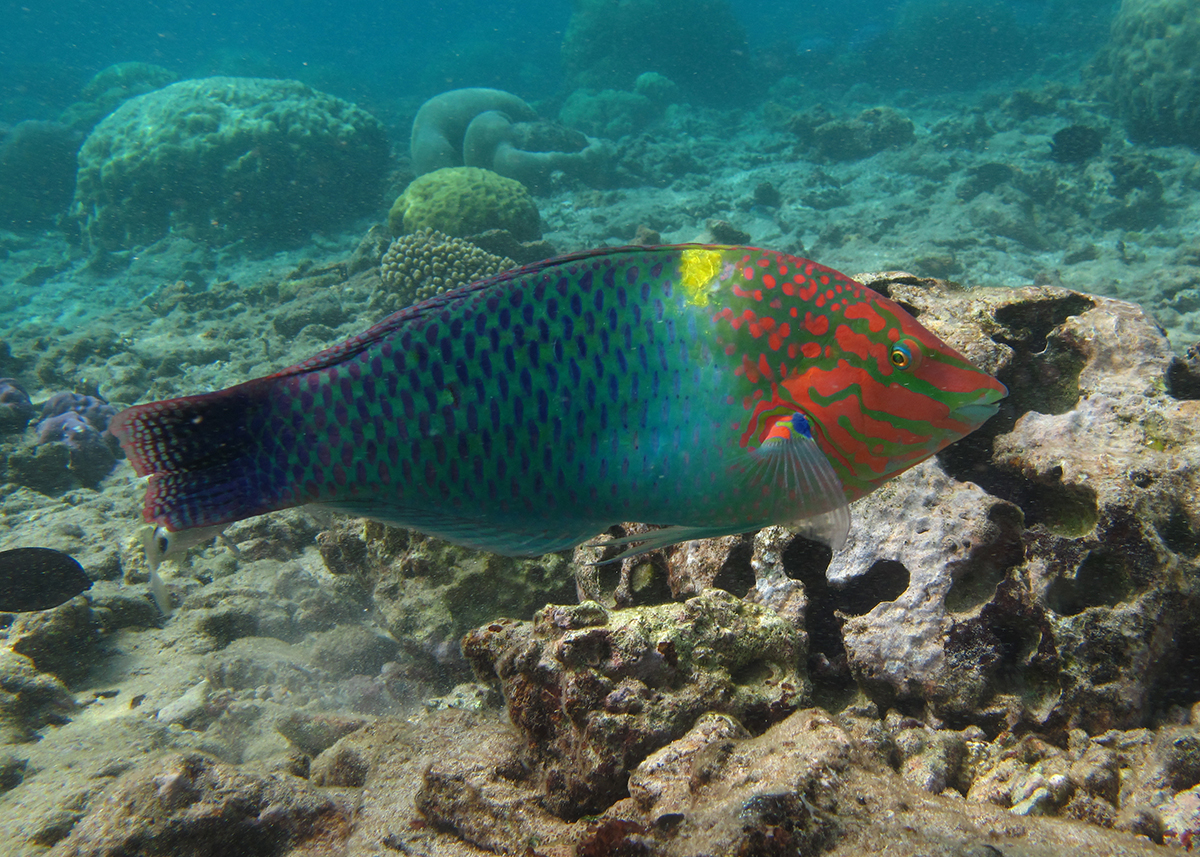
Terminal phase male

In the terminal phase (after gender has been determined at maturity), there is a large variation of coloration. The checkerboard wrasse has a white to greenish background coloration with blue to black on the edge of its scales, reminiscent of a checkerboard pattern. The head is greenish with pink lines stretching to dots behind the eyes until the base of dorsal fin. A bright yellow spot appears at the border of the side and the dorsal fin. Some color variation occur with a possible black spot just behind the characteristic first yellow spot, and a second bright yellow spot can be seen along the edge of the dorsal fin but at the end of this later. In the Red Sea, half the back of some individuals may be colored blue. The caudal fin is truncated and usually yellow with a pinkish pattern, which can be faded or completely blue.

== Distribution and habitat ==
The checkerboard wrasse is widespread throughout the tropical and subtropical waters of the Indian Ocean, from the Red Sea to South Africa, to the oceanic islands (French Polynesia) from central Pacific Ocean. The northern limit is the south of Japan and the southern limit is the Great Barrier Reef.

It is usually found in clear lagoons and on seaward reefs at depths from 1 to 30 m (3.3 to 98 ft).Juveniles are found at the bottom of surge channels or under ledges.

== Biology ==
The checkerboard wrasse is a predator that feeds mainly on small invertebrates such as crustaceans, molluscs, worms, echinoderms captured on the substrate or in the sand.

Like many other wrasses, the checkerboard wrasse is a protogynous hermaphrodite, starting life as a female and later becoming a male, changing sex at maturity when it is about 12.8 cm (5.0 in) long.

== Conservation ==
The species is of minor importance to local commercial fisheries but is targeted for the aquarium trade. It is not currently thought to be under threat and is listed as of Least Concern on the IUCN Red List.
