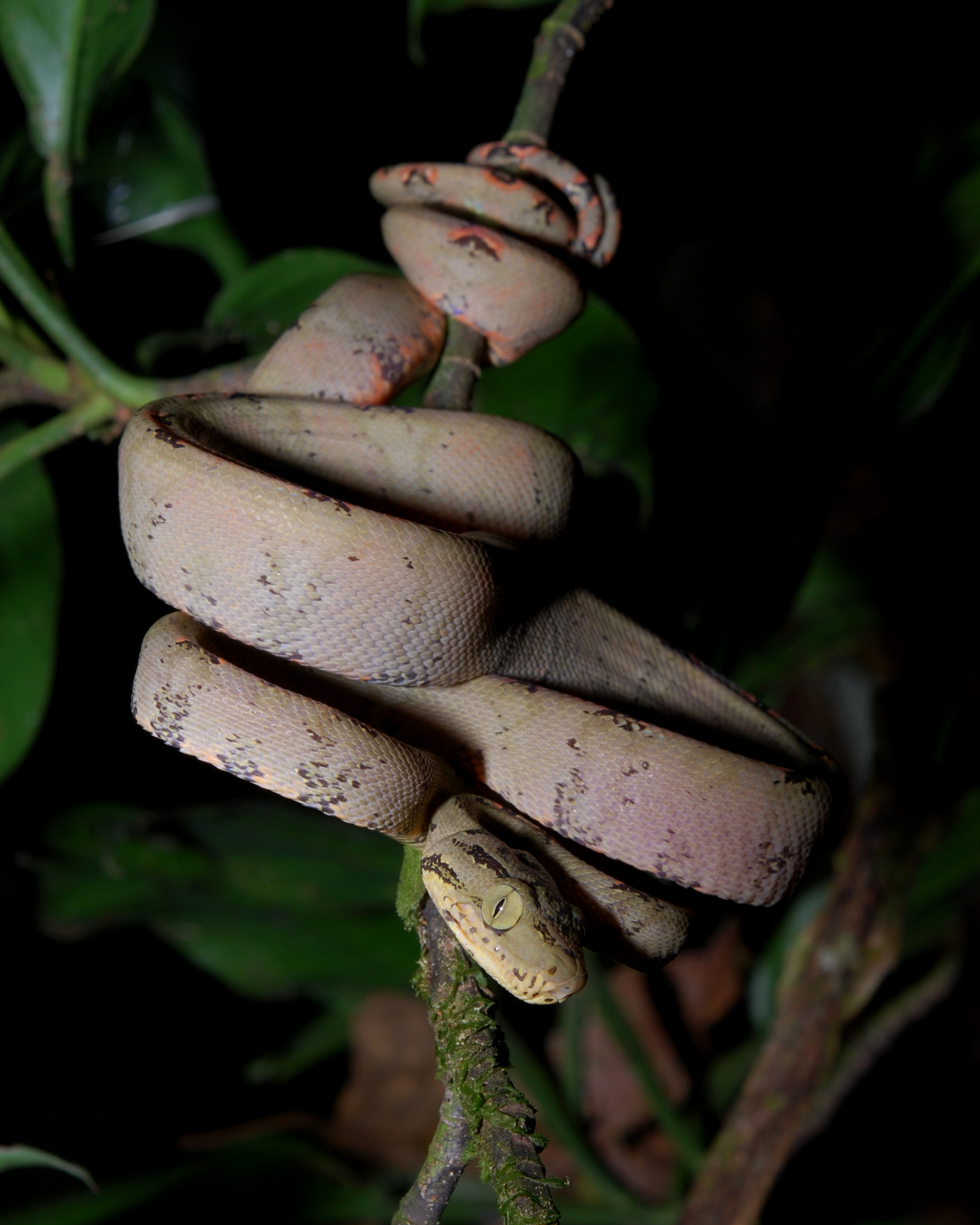
- Juvenile in Ecuador

Conservation status
- Least Concern (IUCN 3.1)

Scientific classification
- Kingdom: Animalia
- Phylum: Chordata
- Class: Reptilia
- Order: Squamata
- Suborder: Serpentes
- Family: Boidae
- Genus: Corallus
- Species: C. hortulana

Binomial name
- Corallus hortulana (Linnaeus, 1758)

Synonyms
- Synonyms List: Coluber hortulanus Linnaeus, 1754; [Boa] Hortulana Linnaeus, 1758; [Boa] Enydris Linnaeus, 1758; Boa hortulana Linnaeus, 1766; Vipera bitis Laurenti, 1768; Vipera madarensis Laurenti, 1768; [Coluber] madarensis Gmelin, 1788; [Coluber] Bitis Gmelin, 1788; Boa Merremii Sentzen, 1796; Boa Ambleocephala Donndorff, 1798; Boa Merremi Schneider, 1801; Boa obtusiceps Bechstein, 1802; Boa elegans Daudin, 1803; Corallus obtusirostris Daudin, 1803; Xiphostoma ornatum Wagler, 1824; Xiphostoma dorsuale - Wagler, 1824; X[iphosoma]. hortulanum Fitzinger, 1826; [Xiphosoma] Merremii Wagler, 1830; Boa modesta Reuss, 1830; Boa hortulana Schlegel, 1837; Corallus maculatus Gray, 1842; Corallus hortulanus Gray, 1842; Xiphosoma hortulanum A.M.C. Duméril & Bibron, 1844; Corallus hortulanus Boulenger, 1893; Boa hortulana Ihering, 1911; Boa hortulana Griffin, 1916; Boa enydris enydris Stull, 1935; Corallus enydris Forcart, 1951; Corallus enydris enydris Forcart, 1951; Corallus hortulanus hortulanus Roze, 1966; Corallus enydris Henderson, 1993; Corallus hortulanus McDiarmid, Touré & Savage, 1996

= Corallus hortulana =

Species of snake

Corallus hortulana, previously known as Corallus hortulanus, and commonly known as the Amazon tree boa, common tree boa, garden tree boa, and macabrel, is a boa species found in South America. Previously, there were two recognized subspecies, Corallus hortulanus hortulanus, and Corallus hortulanus cooki, though the species has undergone taxonomic revision and has been broken up into several species. It is primarily nocturnal and arboreal, though it has been observed feeding and reproducing on the ground. Like all boas, it is non-venomous.

== Description ==
Adults grow to an average of 5 and 6.5 feet (1.5–2 m). This species exhibits an array of colors and patterns. The basic color can be anywhere from black, brown, or gray, to any shade of red, orange, yellow, or many colors in between. The head generally has five dark stripes that extend from the eyes. The eyes can be yellowish, grayish, or reddish, and they have a reflective membrane that results in eyeshine at night. Some are patternless, while others may be speckled, banded, or saddled with rhomboid or chevron shapes. Some reds will have yellow patterns, some yellows red or orange patterns. "The tongue is black. Males and females are similar in size and markings. They range from 525 to 1880 mm in length, usually from 1200 to 1500 mm." Like all other boas they have a pair of anal spurs that extend from the cloaca, which are small, claw-like remnants of vestigial hindlimbs.

In the herpetoculture hobby, they are often distinguished by two color 'phases' that appear genetically inherited, the 'garden phase' and the 'colored phase'. The 'garden phase' refers to boas with drab coloration, mostly brown or olive, with varied patterning, while the 'colored phase' refers to animals with combinations of red, orange, and yellow coloring.

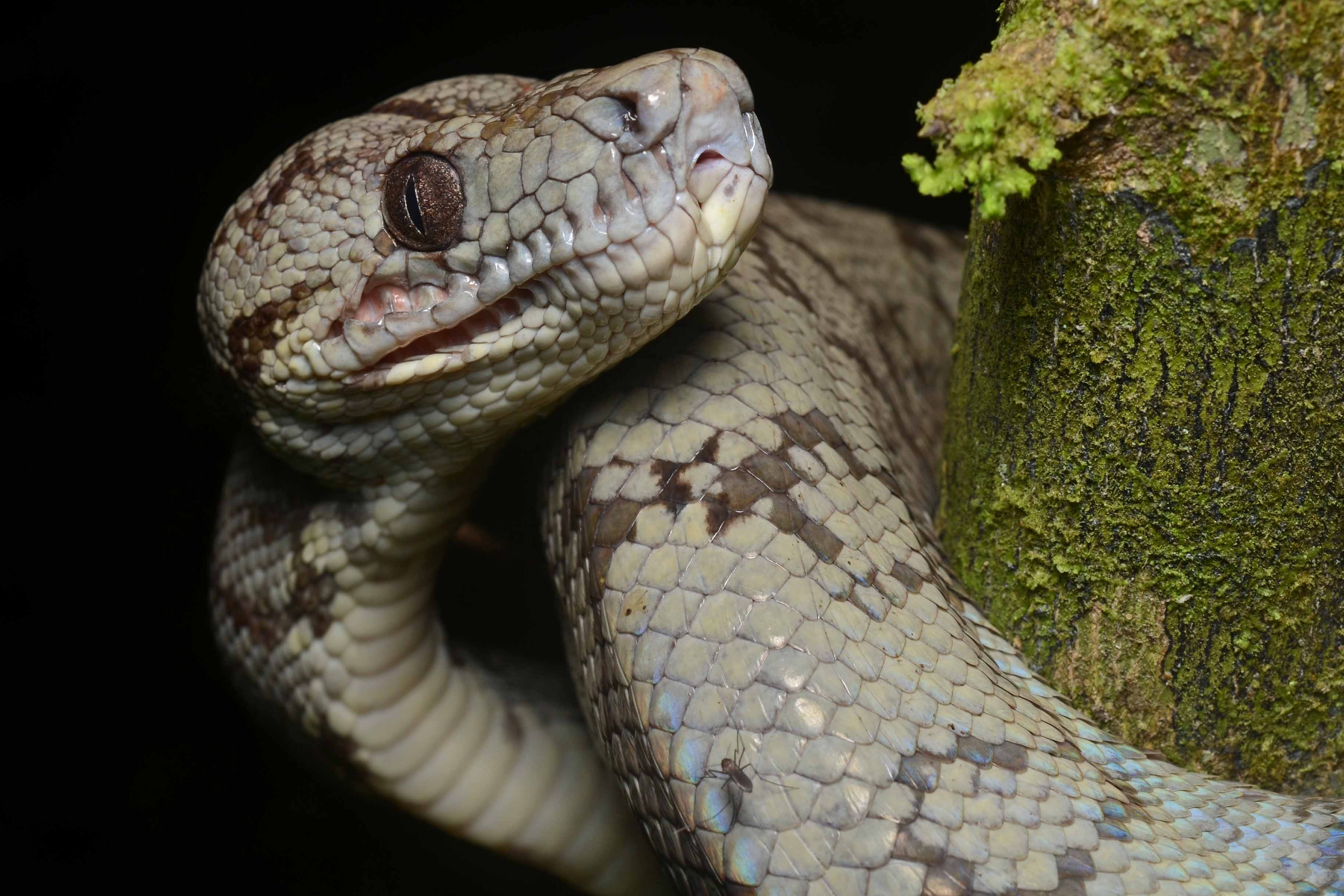
Adult in Peru

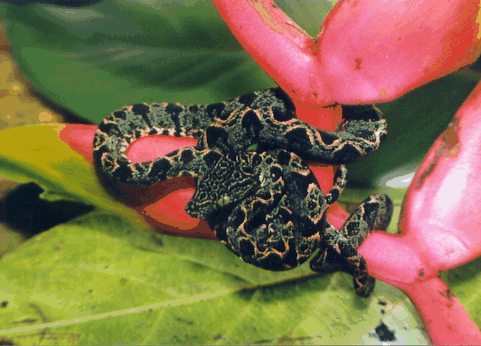
Juvenile in Peru

== Geographic range ==
Corallus hortulana lives in the Guianas, Amazonia, and southeastern Brazil (to the Tropic of Capricorn). Amazon tree boas are found in a wide variety of habitats. They are common in arboreal regions with high humidity, especially Amazon rainforest. They can also be found in dry areas such as savannas or dry forests.

Most studied Corallus hortulana specimens are found 2 m (6.6 ft) or more above the ground in trees or other vegetation. They have also been observed feeding and reproducing on the ground. Amazon tree boas are also relatively common along rivers. They occupy forest, rainforest and scrub forest terrestrial biomes and are especially associated with riparian habitats.

They range from 0 to 900 m (3,000 ft) in elevation, though typically found below 300 m (980 ft) elevation.

== Diet ==
Like all other Boidae, Amazon Tree Boas feed by constricting whole, live prey. They have long teeth which help it to catch potentially flying prey while in trees. The diet is described as being "very euryphagic", which means it consumes a wide variety of prey. Its diet is composed of frogs (mostly treefrogs), lizards (anoles, basilisks, green iguanas, tropic lizards and whiptails such as giant ameivas), birds, mammals (marsupials, bats, primates, porcupines and rodents) and possibly even fish. "More than 50% of the individuals fed on prey weighing up to 20% of their own body mass and about 20% preyed on animals weighing from 40–95% of their masses." In terms of absolute mass, adults fed on larger prey items, while younger specimens ate proportionally larger food items.

It has been suggested that there is an ontogenetic change in general prey preferences with juveniles and subadults eating frogs, lizards, birds, and mammals, while adults eat only birds and mammals.

== Reproduction ==
Amazon Tree Boas, like other Boas are ovoviparous, which means they give birth to live young. The reproductive season of Corallus hortulana can vary between locations, and has variously been attributed to food availability and seasonal conditions. During copulation, the male entangles about 30% of its body around the female and performs movements with his head, including rubbing the chin against the female’s neck and head. In captivity, two males copulated for ~37 minutes with a female, without engaging in combat. After a gestation period of 6–7 months, females give birth to 2–29 young that measure 28.2–64.4 cm (11.1–25.4 in) in total length.

Though the species has a wide distribution and is relatively abundant, comparatively little is known about its reproduction in the wild. There have been 4 documented cases of Amazon Tree Boas copulating in the wild. Surprisingly, though primarily arboreal and nocturnal, Amazon Tree Boas have been documented mating during the day and night as well as in the canopy and on the ground. Two daytime observations were in the trees, while two were on the ground.

== Captivity ==
While Amazon tree boas are encountered relatively frequently in the pet industry, they have a notoriously irritable temperament, do not hesitate to bite, and have specific care requirements. As such, they are not recommended for inexperienced keepers.
