= Pseudorhabdosynochus urceolus =

Scientific classification
- Kingdom: Animalia
- Phylum: Platyhelminthes
- Class: Monogenea
- Order: Dactylogyridea
- Family: Diplectanidae
- Genus: Pseudorhabdosynochus
- Species: P. urceolus

Binomial name
- Pseudorhabdosynochus urceolus Mendoza-Franco, Violante-González & Herrera, 2011

Species of flatworm

Pseudorhabdosynochus urceolus is a diplectanid monogenean parasitic on the gills of groupers. It has been described in 2011.

== Description ==
Pseudorhabdosynochus urceolus is a small monogenean. The species has the general characteristics of other species of Pseudorhabdosynochus, with a flat body and a posterior haptor, which is the organ by which the monogenean attaches itself to the gill of is host. The haptor bears two squamodiscs, one ventral and one dorsal. The sclerotized male copulatory organ, or "quadriloculate organ", has the shape of a bean with four internal chambers, as in other species of Pseudorhabdosynochus.

The vagina includes a sclerotized part, which is a complex structure. The specific name is derived from Latin (urceolus, a small jug or pitcher) and refers to the shape of the vagina.

== Hosts and localities ==
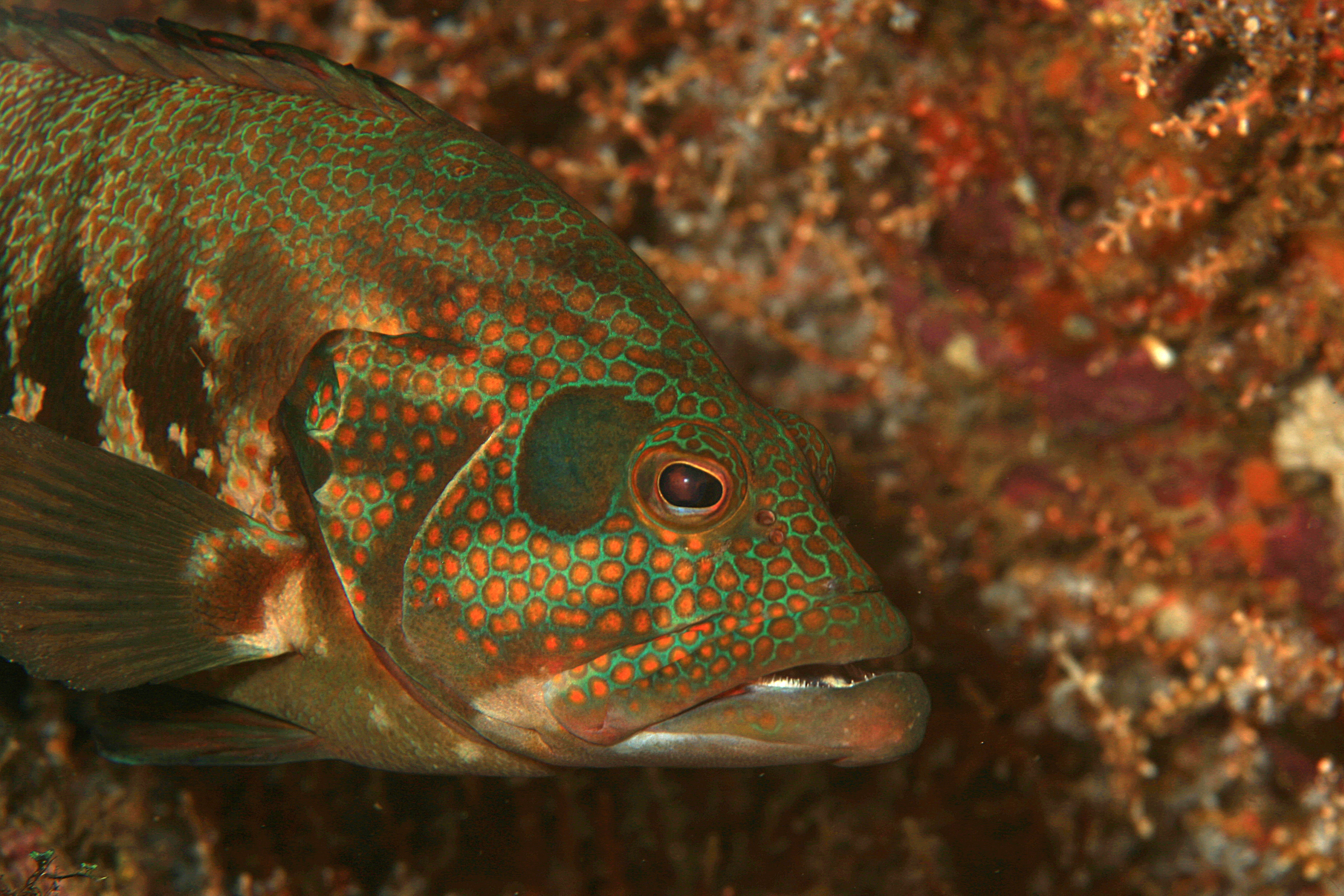
Cephalopholis panamensis is the type-host of Pseudorhabdosynochus urceolus

The graysby, Cephalopholis panamensis is the type-host of Pseudorhabdosynochus urceolus, and the type-locality is Taboga Island in Panama.
