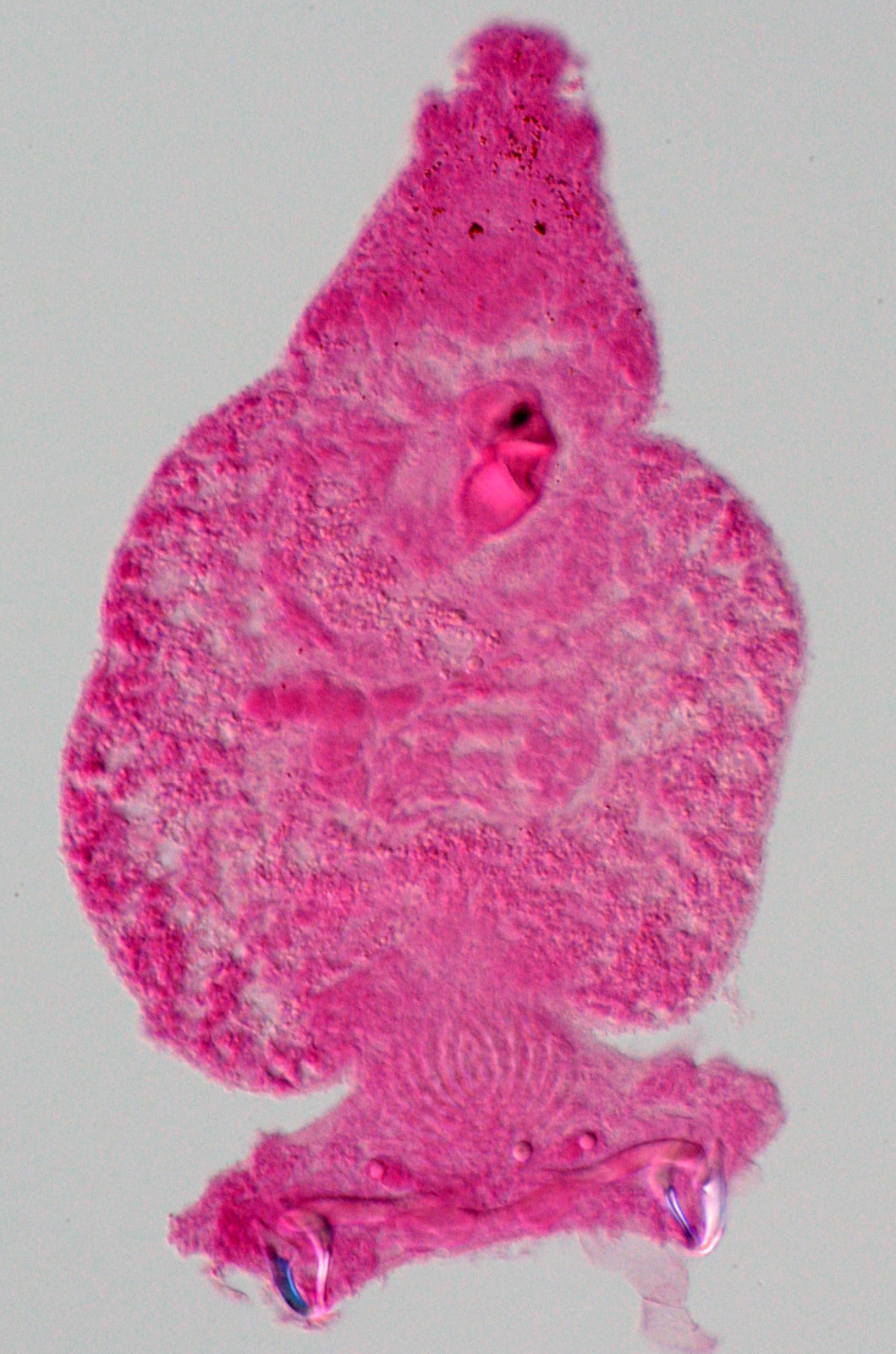
- Pseudorhabdosynochus morrhua

Scientific classification
- Kingdom: Animalia
- Phylum: Platyhelminthes
- Class: Monogenea
- Order: Dactylogyridea
- Family: Diplectanidae
- Genus: Pseudorhabdosynochus; Yamaguti, 1958

Species
- See text

= Pseudorhabdosynochus =

Genus of flatworms

Pseudorhabdosynochus is a genus of monopisthocotylean monogeneans, included in the family Diplectanidae. The type-species of the genus is Pseudorhabdosynochus epinepheli (Yamaguti, 1938).

The genus includes more than 80 species, which are all parasitic on the gills of marine fish, especially groupers. Since groupers are mostly abundant in warm waters, species of Pseudorhabdosynochus are found in warm parts of the oceans, especially in coral reefs, but species have also been found in deep-sea groupers. Several species of Pseudorhabdosynochus are pathogens of maricultured groupers.

== Morphology ==
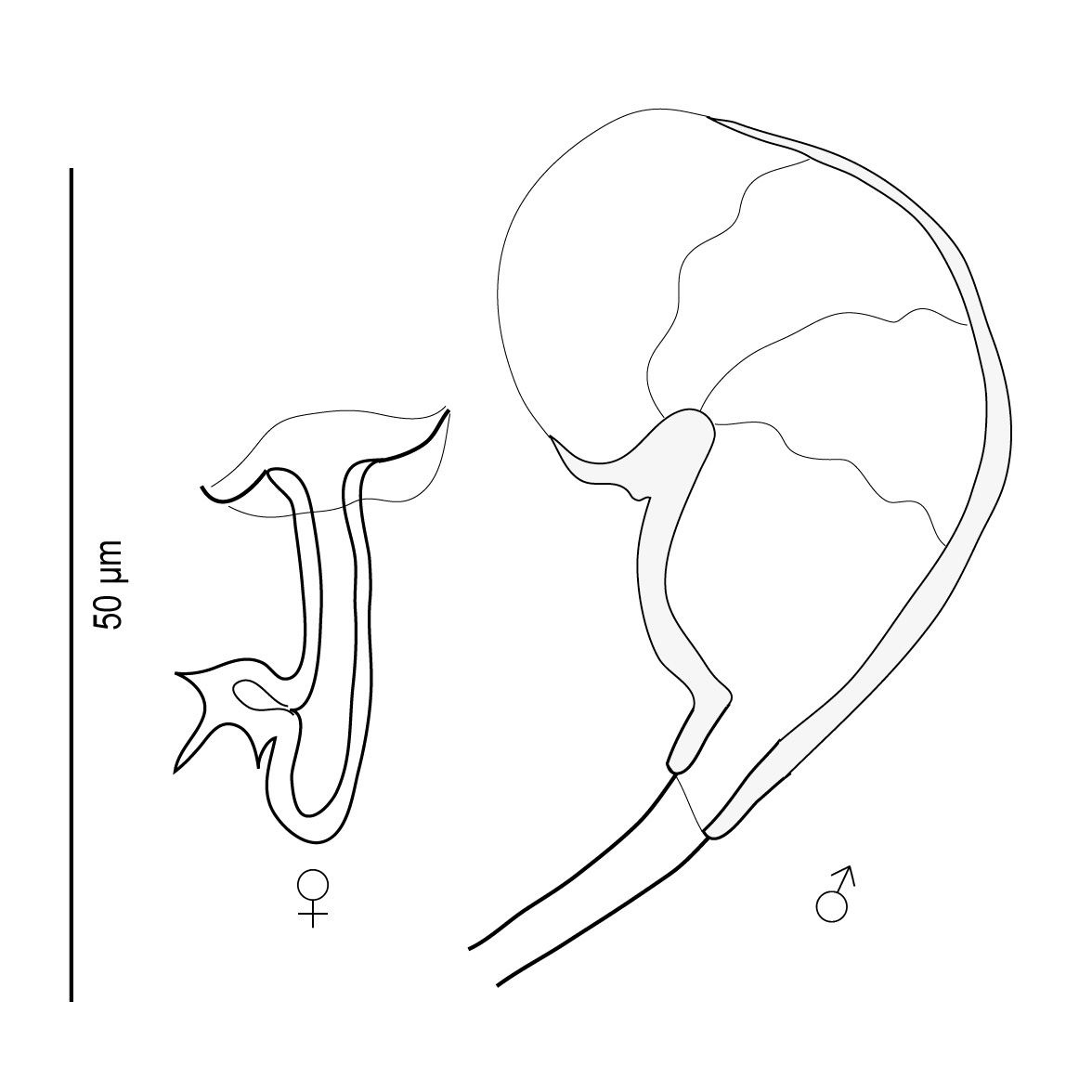
Female (left) and male (right) sclerotized organs of a species of Pseudorhabdosynochus, P. caledonicus

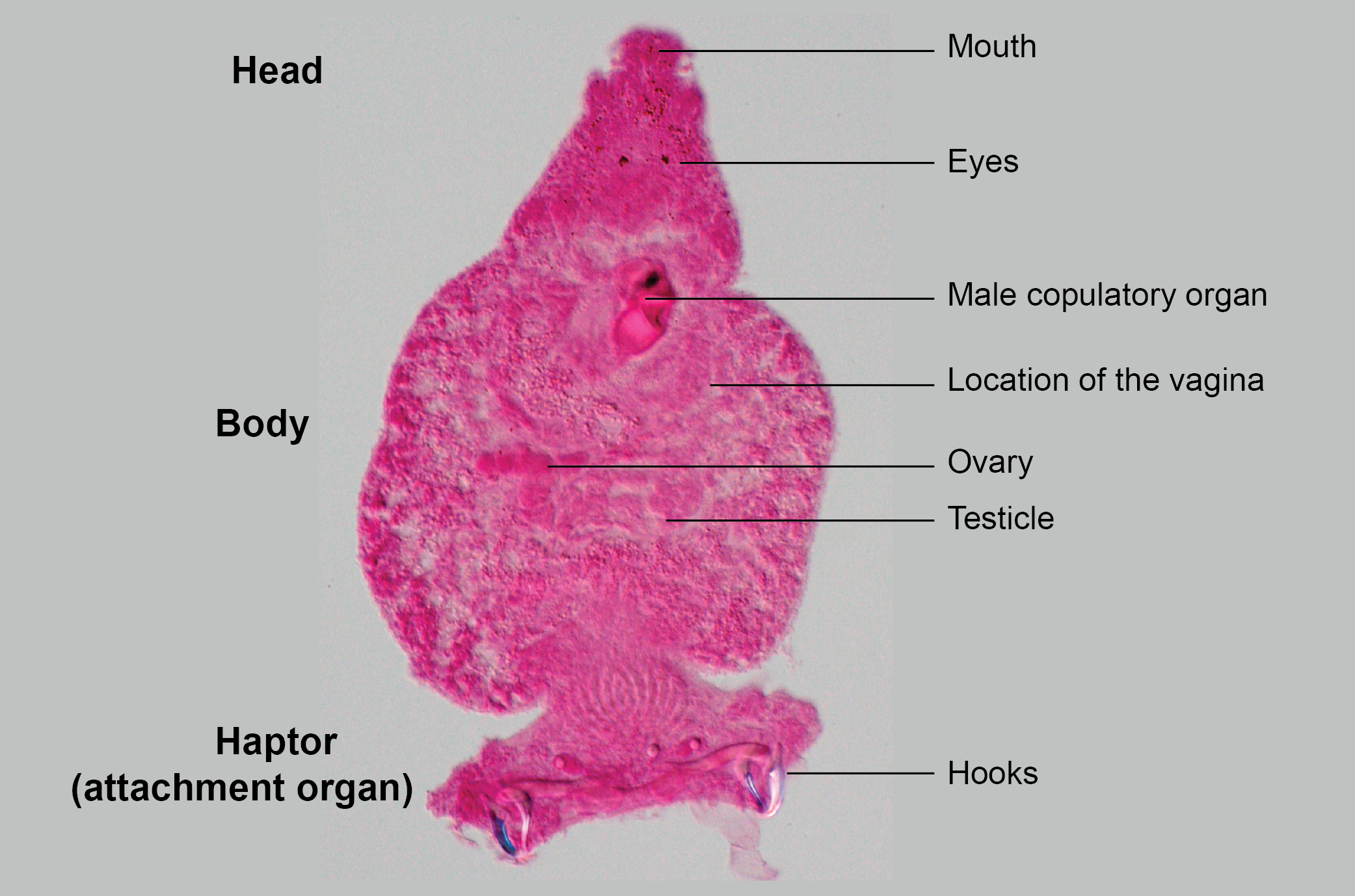
A species of Pseudorhabdosynochus with captions for main parts and organs

All species of Pseudorhabdosynochus are small animals, ranging 0.3–1 mm in length.

As most monogeneans, they are flat, with an anterior head bearing four oculi and head glands, a main elongate body and a posterior haptor. The digestive system includes an anterior muscular pharynx, and two lateral intestinal branches (or caeca); as in all Platyhelminthes, there is no anus. The haptor, in the posterior part of the body, is a specialized organ used to attach to the host. The haptor includes sclerotized elements, namely a ventral bar, two lateral (dorsal) bars, two ventral hooks and two dorsal hooks, and fourteen hooklets. As in most diplectanids, the haptor bears special, characteristic, structures called squamodiscs. The squamodiscs (one ventral and one dorsal) of species of Pseudorhabdosynochus are made up of numerous rodlets aligned as concentric rows. All species of the genus have two squamodiscs except Pseudorhabdosynochus sinediscus Neifar & Euzet, 2007 in which these organs are completely lacking.

Adults are hermaphroditic. The reproductive organ include a single ovary and a single testis. As in all diplectanids, the ovary (or germarium) is anterior to the testis and loops around the right intestinal caecum. Species of Pseudorhabdosynochus are characterized by a sclerotized male copulatory organ, or "quadriloculate organ", which has the shape of a bean with four internal chambers. The vagina includes a sclerotized part, which is a complex structure with several chambers and canals, generally used for the diagnosis and differentiation of species.

== Etymology and nomenclatural case ==
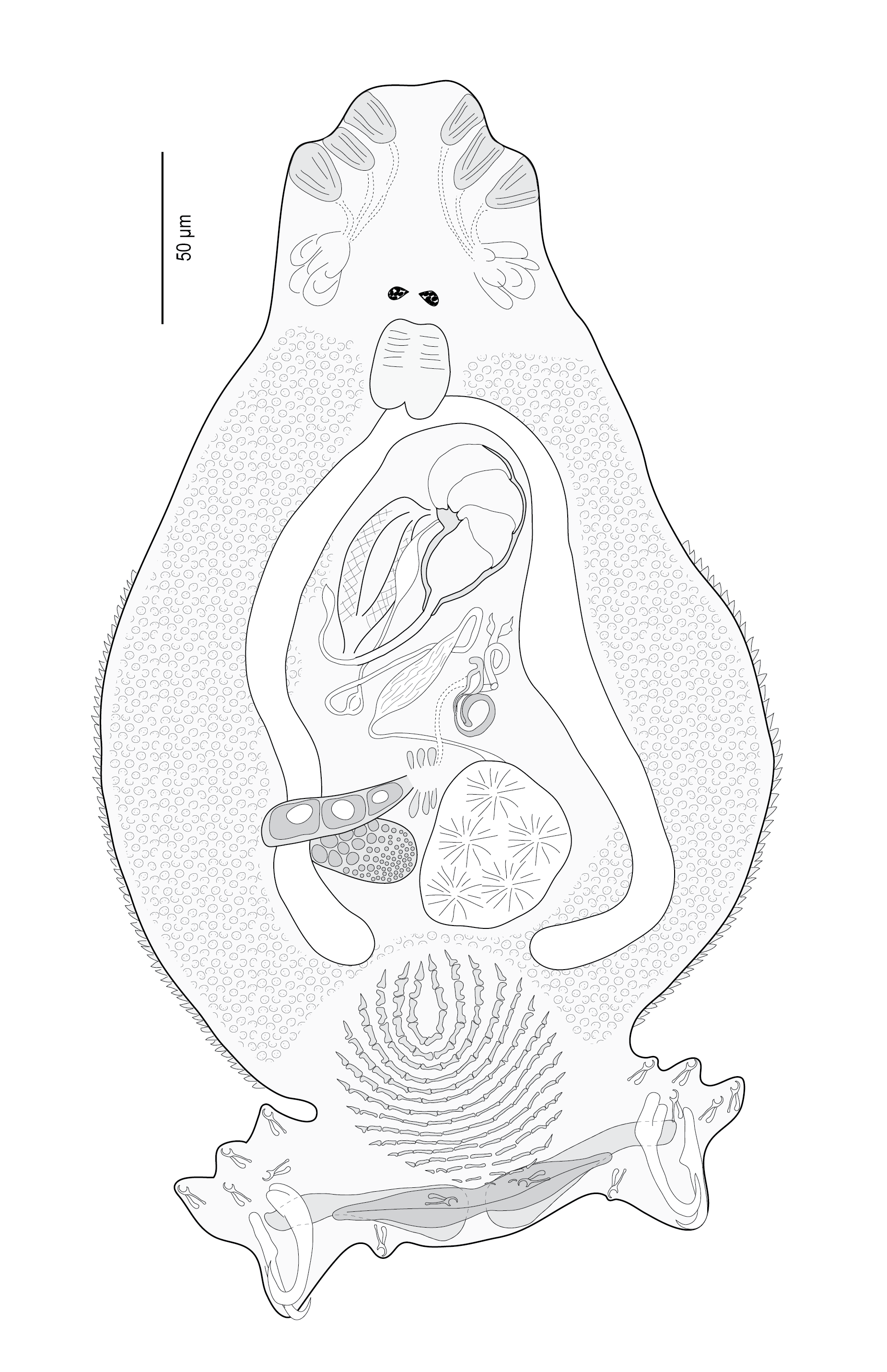
A drawing of the type-species, Pseudorhabdosynochus epinepheli

The origin of the name Pseudorhabdosynochus merits an explanation. 'Pseudo-' (from Greek ψευδής, pseudes, "lying, false") is a prefix commonly used in creating a new scientific name for a taxon that superficially appears to be a taxon, but actually is another. The famous Japanese parasitologist Satyu Yamaguti described a 'membranous plaque' on the posterior region of Pseudorhabdosynochus epinepheli and created the generic name Pseudorhabdosynochus in reference to the diplectanid genus Rhabdosynochus which, in his interpretation, also had lateral plaques. It has been shown later that 'plaques' in P. epinepheli was an erroneous interpretation of damaged specimens. Moreover, the diagnosis of Rhabdosynochus was later modified and it is now considered that species of this genus do not have plaques. Therefore, the genus name Pseudorhabdosynochus is the result of both an erroneous observation and an erroneous comparison by Satyu Yamaguti. However, it is valid according to the ICZN.

Pseudorhabdosynochus is also an interesting nomenclatural case. Yamaguti described the same species twice, the first time in 1938 (as Diplectanum epinepheli Yamaguti, 1938) and the second time in 1958 (as Pseudorhabdosynochus epinepheli Yamaguti, 1958). In both papers, the species was described from parasites collected from the same fish species, the grouper Epinephelus akaara off Japan. Kritsky & Beverley-Burton (1986) solved this case with reference to the International Code of Zoological Nomenclature. The type-species of the genus is the name Pseudorhabdosynochus epinepheli Yamaguti, 1958. Pseudorhabdosynochus epinepheli Yamaguti, 1958 is a junior synonym of Pseudorhabdosynochus epinepheli (Yamaguti, 1938) Kritsky & Beverley-Burton, 1986 and Pseudorhabdosynochus epinepheli (Yamaguti, 1938) Kritsky & Beverley-Burton, 1986 is the modern valid combination for Diplectanum epinepheli Yamaguti, 1938. The latter species (a taxon) and the type-species of the genus (a name) are considered to correspond to the same biological taxon but have different, although valid, names. Recent re-examination of type-specimens have confirmed this interpretation.

== Hosts ==
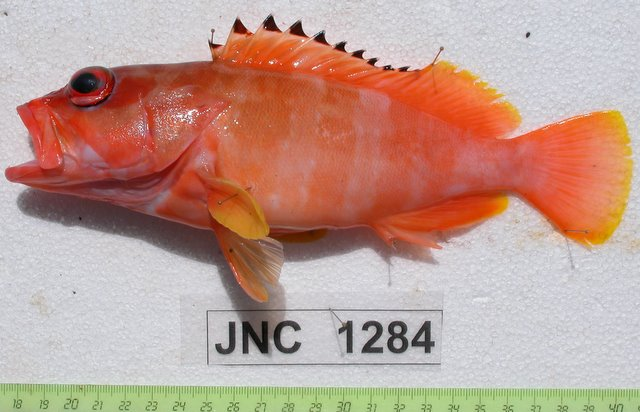
Grouper, such as the blacktip grouper here, harbour Pseudorhabdosynochus species on their gills

Species of Pseudorhabdosynochus are parasitic exclusively on the gill filaments of marine fish. Most of these fish belong to the family Serranidae and are commonly known as groupers, such as many species of the genus Epinephelus, and also species of Cephalopholis, Mycteroperca and Variola. A few species have also been described from fish of the genera Alphestes, Paranthias and Paralabrax.

As most diplectanids, species of Pseudorhabdosynochus are generally strictly species-specific, i.e. a species is found on a single species of host and no others. However, several exceptions have been reported. Some species of groupers harbour a wide biodiversity of Pseudorhabdosynochus species (and sometimes other monogeneans as well). Examples are Epinephelus maculatus which has 8 distinct Pseudorhabdosynochus species, and Epinephelus malabaricus which has 7 species.

== Life cycle ==
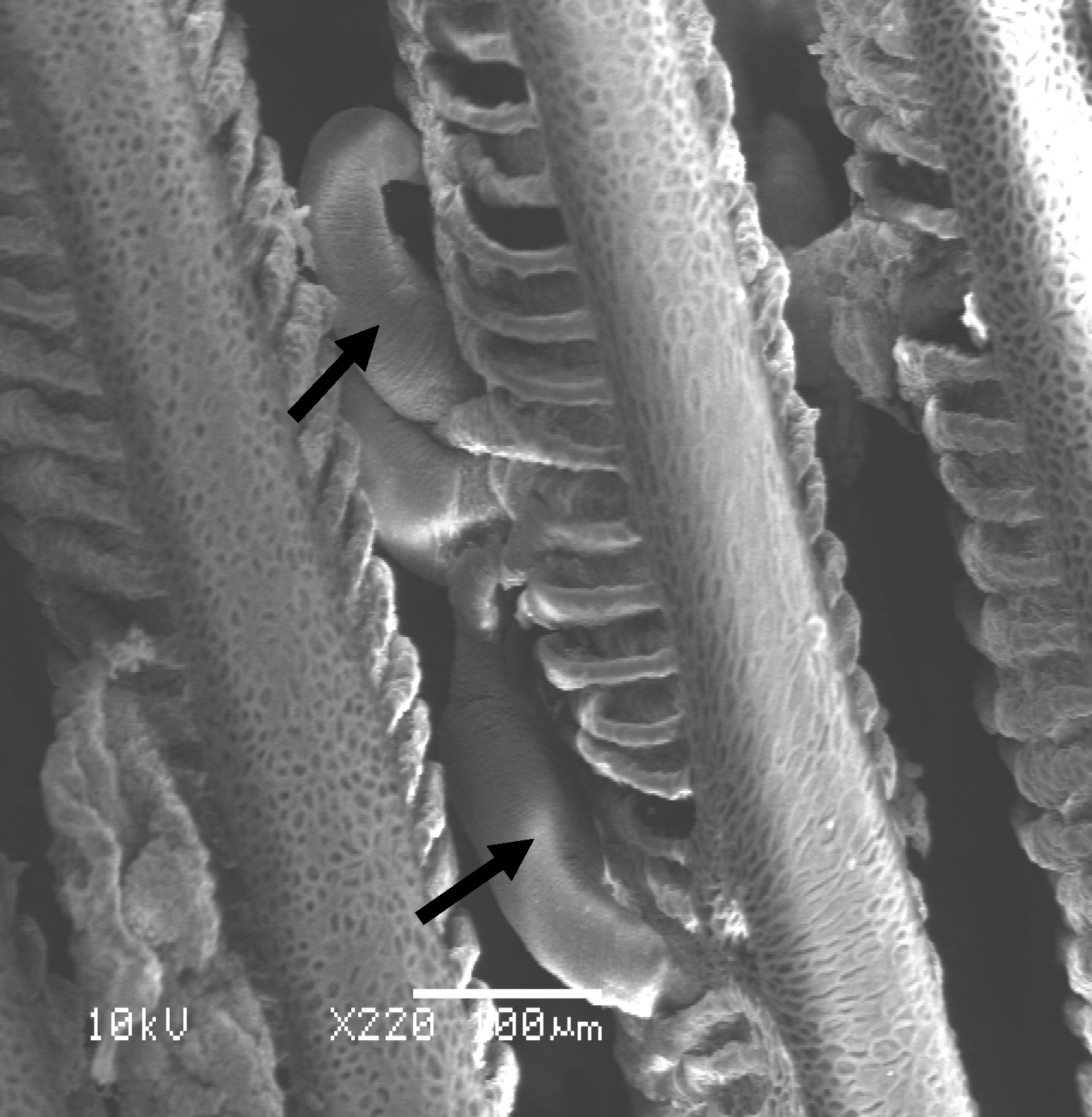
Adult Pseudorhabdosynochus lantauensis (arrows) on the gill filament of a grouper. Scanning electron microscopy.

The life cycle of Pseudorhabdosynochus species is similar to that of other diplectanid monogeneans. It is monoxenous, i.e. there is a single host, the fish. The life-cycle includes a parasitic phase, the adult worm, and two stages which are free in the environment, the egg and the larva. The adult hermaphroditic worm, which lives on the gills of fish, lays eggs in the water. The egg has an operculum. A larva develops in the egg and hatches through the operculum; the swimming larva is ciliated and called an oncomiracidium. The larva finds its host by swimming to it, first attaches to the skin and migrates to the gills, and eventually transforms itself into a young monogenean which is attached to the gill filament by its haptor. During transformation from larva to adult, the monogenean loses its cilia and produces a new tegument, a phenomenon which is considered a general characteristic of the parasitic Platyhelminthes or Neodermata.

Information is available for the life-cycle of Pseudorhabdosynochus lantauensis, a parasite of the orange-spotted grouper Epinephelus coioides, at a temperature of 30 °C. The adult lays 10-22 eggs/day. The eggs hatch within 2–4 days. The oncomiracidium is viable for 4-8 h and should find a host within this delay. After attachment, the oncomiracidium transforms into an adult in 4–7 days. The parasite produces eggs after 7 days. The life-cycle is thus complete in 13–20 days (at 30 °C).

Certain species of Pseudorhabdosynochus parasitize groupers which show spawning aggregations, i.e. the adult fish gather annually at a precise location and meet other fish of their own species only once per year. It has been suggested that transmission of Pseudorhabdosynochus species occurs preferentially during these spawning aggregations, from older infected fish to younger, uninfected, fish.

== Pathology and control in mariculture ==
Species of Pseudorhabdosynochus are attached to the gills of groupers. No information is available on the pathogen effect of these parasites in wild groupers. Since the life-cycle is monoxenous and thus can be completed with a high rate of success in mariculture condition, species of Pseudorhabdosynochus can proliferate on gills of cultured groupers and become dangerous for the fish, inducing mortality.

Parasite infections are often measured by two variables, prevalence (the proportion of infected hosts) and intensity (the number of parasites per host). Prevalences as high as 100% (i.e. all fish are infected) have been reported for Pseudorhabdosynochus sp. in cage-cultured Epinephelus malabaricus in Thailand, for Pseudorhabdosynochus sp. on Epinephelus fuscoguttatus and Epinephelus coioides maricultured in Indonesia, and for P. beverleyburtonae on Epinephelus marginatus, wild or maricultured, in Brazil. Intensities are as high as up to 1,006 individual Pseudorhabdosynochus sp. per fish (Epinephelus fuscoguttatus) in Indonesia, up to 294 P. coioidesis per fish (Epinephelus coioides) in South China, 327 P. yucatanensis per fish on Epinephelus morio in Mexico, and 500 P. epinepheli per 100 grams of gill filaments of Epinephelus akaara in Japan.

Eradication of gill parasitic monogeneans is a problem because various chemical treatments can be harmful for the fish. Treatments used against Pseudorhabdosynochus species include freshwater, diluted formalin, and diluted hydrogen peroxide (H_{2}O_{2}). Diluted hydrogen peroxide (H_{2}O_{2}) seems the preferred treatment for P. epinepheli on Epinephelus akaara and P. lantauensis on Epinephelus coioides.

== List of species ==
Lists of species have been provided by Kritsky & Beverley-Burton (1986) and Justine (2007). The list below (about 80 species) is based on the World Register of Marine Organisms with additions.

- P. americanus (Price, 1937) Kritsky & Beverley-Burton, 1986
- P. amplidiscatus (Bravo-Hollis, 1954) Kritsky & Beverley-Burton, 1986
- P. anulus Mendoza-Franco, Violante-González & Herrera, 2011
- P. argus Justine, 2007
- P. auitoe Justine, 2007
- P. bacchus Sigura, Chauvet & Justine, 2007
- P. beverleyburtonae (Oliver, 1984) Kritsky & Beverley-Burton, 1986
- P. bocquetae (Oliver & Paperna, 1984) Kritsky & Beverley-Burton, 1986
- P. bouaini Neifar & Euzet, 2007
- P. buitoe Justine, 2007
- P. bunkleywilliamsae Kritsky, Bakenhaster & Adams, 2015
- P. caballeroi (Oliver, 1984) Kritsky & Beverley-Burton, 1986
- P. calathus Hinsinger & Justine, 2006
- P. caledonicus Justine, 2005
- P. capurroi Vidal-Martinez & Mendoza-Franco, 1998
- P. cephalopholi Saengpheng & Purivirojkul, 2022
- P. chauveti Sigura & Justine, 2008
- P. chinensis Zhang & Liu, 2001
- P. coioidesis Bu, Leong, Wong, Woo & Foo, 1999
- P. contubernalis Kritsky, Bakenhaster & Adams, 2015
- P. crassus Schoelinck & Justine, 2011
- P. cuitoe Justine, 2007
- P. cupatus (Young, 1969) Kritsky & Beverley-Burton, 1986
- P. cyanopodus Sigura & Justine, 2008
- P. cyathus Hinsinger & Justine, 2006
- P. dionysos Schoelinck & Justine, 2011
- P. dolicocolpos Neifar & Euzet, 2007
- P. duitoe Justine, 2007
- P. enitsuji Neifar & Euzet, 2007
- P. epinepheli (Yamaguti, 1938) Kritsky & Beverley-Burton, 1986
- P. euitoe Justine, 2007
- P. exoticoides Justine & Henry, 2010
- P. exoticus Sigura & Justine, 2008
- P. firmicoleatus Kritsky, Bakenhaster & Adams, 2015
- P. fuitoe Justine, 2007
- P. fulgidus Mendoza-Franco, Violante-González & Herrera, 2011
- P. guerreroensis Mendoza-Franco, Violante-González & Herrera, 2011
- P. guitoe Justine, 2007
- P. hargisi (Oliver & Paperna, 1984) Santos, Buchmann & Gibson, 2000
- P. hayet Chaabane, Neifar, Gey & Justine, 2016
- P. hirundineus Justine, 2005
- P. huitoe Justine, 2007
- P. hyphessometochus Kritsky, Bakenhaster & Adams, 2015
- P. inversus Justine, 2008
- P. jeanloui Knoff, Cohen, Cárdenas, Cárdenas-Callirgos & Gomes, 2015
- P. justinei Zeng & Yang, 2007
- P. justinella Kritsky, Bakenhaster & Adams, 2015
- P. kasetsartensis Saengpheng & Purivirojkul, 2020
- P. kritskyi Dyer, Williams & Bunkley-Williams, 1995
- P. lantauensis (Beverley-Burton & Suriano, 1981) Kritsky & Beverley-Burton, 1986
- P. maaensis Justine & Sigura, 2007
- P. magnisquamodiscum (Aljoshkina, 1984) Santos, Buchmann & Gibson, 2000
- P. malabaricus Justine & Sigura, 2007
- P. manifestus Justine & Sigura, 2007
- P. manipulus Justine & Sigura, 2007
- P. marcellus Justine & Sigura, 2007
- P. maternus Justine & Sigura, 2007
- P. mcmichaeli Kritsky, Bakenhaster & Adams, 2015
- P. meganmarieae Kritsky, Bakenhaster & Adams, 2015
- P. melanesiensis (Laird, 1958) Kritsky & Beverley-Burton, 1986
- P. minutus Justine, 2007
- P. mizellei Kritsky, Bakenhaster & Adams, 2015
- P. monaensis Dyer, Williams & Bunkley-Williams, 1994
- P. morrhua Justine, 2008
- P. mycteropercae Kritsky, Bakenhaster & Adams, 2015
- P. oliveri Chaabane, Neifar, Gey & Justine, 2016
- P. pai Justine & Vignon, 2009
- P. podocyanus Sigura & Justine, 2008
- P. quadratus Schoelinck & Justine, 2011
- P. querni (Yamaguti, 1968) Kritsky & Beverley-Burton, 1986
- P. regius Chaabane, Neifar & Justine, 2015
- P. riouxi (Oliver, 1986) Santos, Buchmann & Gibson, 2000
- P. samaesarnensis Saengpheng & Purivirojkul, 2022
- P. satyui Justine, 2009
- P. serrani (Yamaguti, 1953) Kritsky & Beverley-Burton, 1986
- P. shenzhenensis Yang, Zeng & Gibson, 2005
- P. sinediscus Neifar & Euzet, 2007
- P. sosia Neifar & Euzet, 2007
- P. spirani Mendoza-Franco, Violante-González & Herrera, 2011
- P. stigmosus Justine & Henry, 2010
- P. sulamericanus Santos, Buchmann & Gibson, 2004
- P. summanae (Young, 1969) Kritsky & Beverley-Burton, 1986
- P. summanoides Yang, Gibson & Zeng, 2005
- P. suratthaniensis Saengpheng & Purivirojkul, 2022
- P. tabogaensis Mendoza-Franco, Violante-González & Herrera, 2011
- P. tumeovagina Kritsky, Bakenhaster & Adams, 2015
- P. urceolus Mendoza-Franco, Violante-González & Herrera, 2011
- P. vagampullum (Young, 1969) Kritsky & Beverley-Burton, 1986
- P. variabilis Justine, 2008
- P. vascellum Kritsky, Bakenhaster & Adams, 2015
- P. venus Hinsinger & Justine, 2006
- P. viscosus Schoelinck & Justine, 2011
- P. williamsi Kritsky, Bakenhaster & Adams, 2015
- P. woodi Kritsky, Bakenhaster & Adams, 2015
- P. youngi Justine, Dupoux & Cribb, 2009
- P. yucatanensis Vidal-Martinez, Aguirre-Macedo & Mendoza-Franco, 1997
