= Pseudorhabdosynochus summanoides =

Scientific classification
- Kingdom: Animalia
- Phylum: Platyhelminthes
- Class: Monogenea
- Order: Dactylogyridea
- Family: Diplectanidae
- Genus: Pseudorhabdosynochus
- Species: P. summanoides

Binomial name
- Pseudorhabdosynochus summanoides Yang, Gibson & Zeng, 2005

Species of worm

Pseudorhabdosynochus summanoides is a species of diplectanid monogenean parasitic on the gills of the orange-spotted grouper Epinephelus coioides. It was described in 2005.

== Description ==
Pseudorhabdosynochus summanoides is a small monogenean, 0.3-0.5 mm in length. The species has the general characteristics of other species of Pseudorhabdosynochus, with a flat body and a posterior haptor, which is the organ by which the monogenean attaches itself to the gill of is host. The haptor bears two squamodiscs, one ventral and one dorsal. The sclerotized male copulatory organ, or "quadriloculate organ", has the shape of a bean with four internal chambers, as in other species of Pseudorhabdosynochus. The vagina includes a sclerotized part, which is a complex structure.

== Etymology ==
The name of the species, summanoides, refers to "Pseudorhabdosynochus summanae Young, 1968, the species which it most closely resembles".

== Hosts and localities ==
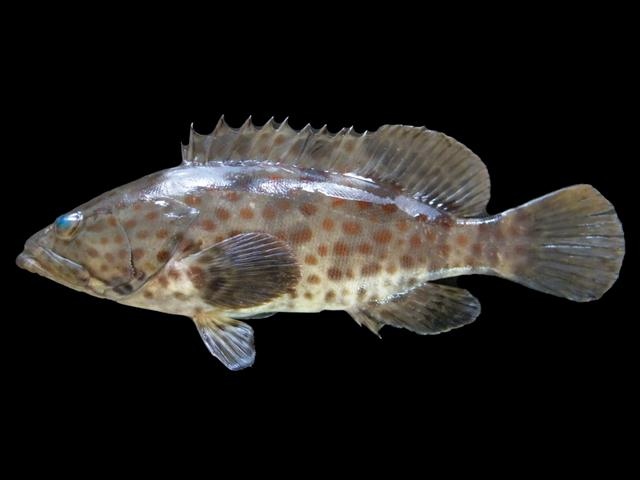
The orange-spotted grouper Epinephelus coioides, the host of Pseudorhabdosynochus summanoides

The type-locality is Dapeng Bay, South China Sea, off Nan’ao, Shenzhen, Guangdong Province, China (23°62'N, 114°07'E), and the type-host is the orange-spotted grouper Epinephelus coioides.
