= Pseudorhabdosynochus fulgidus =

Scientific classification
- Kingdom: Animalia
- Phylum: Platyhelminthes
- Class: Monogenea
- Order: Dactylogyridea
- Family: Diplectanidae
- Genus: Pseudorhabdosynochus
- Species: P. fulgidus

Binomial name
- Pseudorhabdosynochus fulgidus Mendoza-Franco, Violante-González & Herrera, 2011

Species of flatworm

Pseudorhabdosynochus fulgidus is a diplectanid monogenean parasitic on the gills of groupers. It has been described in 2011.

== Description ==
Pseudorhabdosynochus fulgidus is a small monogenean. The species has the general characteristics of other species of Pseudorhabdosynochus, with a flat body and a posterior haptor, which is the organ by which the monogenean attaches itself to the gill of is host. The haptor bears two squamodiscs, one ventral and one dorsal. The sclerotized male copulatory organ, or "quadriloculate organ", has the shape of a bean with four internal chambers, as in other species of Pseudorhabdosynochus. The vagina includes a sclerotized part, which is a complex structure.

== Hosts and localities ==
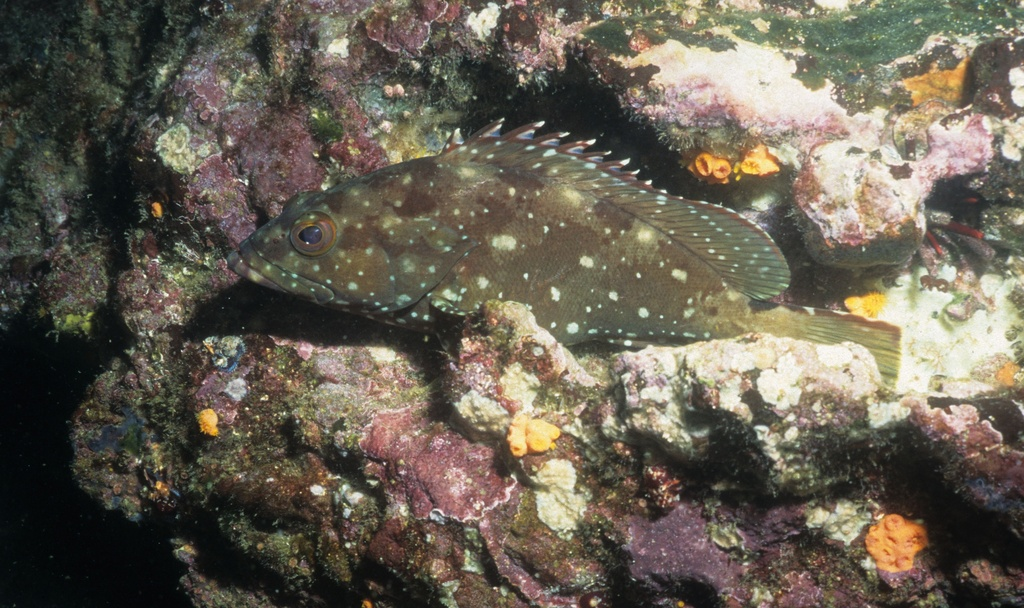
Epinephelus labriformis is the host of Pseudorhabdosynochus anulus

The Starry grouper Epinephelus labriformis is the type-host of Pseudorhabdosynochus anulus, and the type-locality is Taboga Island in Panama. The species has also been found on the same fish host off the Pearl Islands in Panama and off the Pacific coast of Mexico.

The species was named from the Latin fulgidus (meaning starry, gleaming) and refers to the common name of its host, the Starry grouper.
