= Pseudorhabdosynochus americanus =

- Pseudorhabdosynochus americanus, body and details of sclerotised parts

Scientific classification
- Kingdom: Animalia
- Phylum: Platyhelminthes
- Class: Monogenea
- Order: Dactylogyridea
- Family: Diplectanidae
- Genus: Pseudorhabdosynochus
- Species: P. americanus

Binomial name
- Pseudorhabdosynochus americanus (Price, 1937) Kritsky & Beverley-Burton, 1986

Synonyms
- Diplectanum americanum Price, 1937; Cycloplectanum americanum (Price, 1937) Oliver, 1968 (pro parte)

Species of flatworm

Pseudorhabdosynochus americanus is a diplectanid monogenean parasitic on the gills of groupers. It was described as Diplectanum americanum by Price in 1937 and transferred to the genus Pseudorhabdosynochus by Kritsky and Beverley-Burton in 1986. The species was redescribed by Kritsky, Bakenhaster and Adams in 2015.

== Description ==
Pseudorhabdosynochus americanus is a small monogenean. The species has the general characteristics of other species of Pseudorhabdosynochus, with a flat body and a posterior haptor, which is the organ by which the monogenean attaches itself to the gill of is host. The haptor bears two squamodiscs, one ventral and one dorsal. The sclerotized male copulatory organ, or "quadriloculate organ", has the shape of a bean with four internal chambers, as in other species of Pseudorhabdosynochus. The vagina includes a sclerotized part, which is a complex structure.

The redescription by Kritsky, Bakenhaster & Adams in 2015 includes the following: Body flattened dorsoventrally. Tegumental scales with rounded anterior margins extending from peduncle anteriorly into posterior trunk. Cephalic region broad, with two terminal and two bilateral poorly developed cephalic lobes, three bilateral pairs of head organs, pair of bilateral groups of cephalic-gland cells at level of pharynx. Posterior pair of eyespots lacking lenses, lying immediately anterior to pharynx (two specimens lacking one member of the pair); anterior pair usually absent, often represented by few poorly associated chromatic granules (one specimen with well-developed anterior eyespots lacking lenses); accessory chromatic granules small, irregular, usually anterior to posterior pair of eyespots. Pharynx with muscular wall; esophagus short to nonexistent; intestinal ceca blind, extending posteriorly to near anterior limit of peduncle. Peduncle broad, tapered posteriorly. Haptor with dorsal and ventral anteromedial lobes containing respective squamodiscs and lateral lobes having hook pairs 2–4, 6, 7. Dorsal and ventral squamodiscs subequal, with 19–23 (usually 21) U-shaped rows of rodlets; 1–3 (usually 2) innermost rows closed. Ventral anchor with well-developed superficial root, long deep root having lateral swelling, slightly curved shaft, and short recurved point extending to just past level of tip of superficial root. Dorsal anchor with subtriangular base, poorly developed roots, arcing shaft, recurved point extending past level of superficial tip of base. Ventral bar with slight medial constriction, tapered ends, longitudinal medioventral groove. Paired dorsal bar with spatulate medial end. Hook with elongate depressed thumb, delicate point, uniform shank; filamentous hook (FH) loop nearly shank length. Testis ovate, lying sinistroposterior to germarium; proximal vas deferens, prostatic reservoir not observed; seminal vesicle an indistinct dilation of distal vas deferens, lying just posterior to MCO; ejaculatory bulb not observed. Male copulatory organ (MCO) reniform, quadriloculate, with short distal cone, elongate tube with comparatively thick walls, delicate apparently retractile distal filament; walls of two distal chambers thick, walls of proximal two chambers thinner but comparatively rigid. Germarium pyriform, shaped as an inverted comma; germarial bulb lying diagonally at body midlength, with elongate dorsoventral distal loop around right intestinal cecum; ootype lying to left of body midline, with well-developed Mehlis’ gland and giving rise to delicate banana-shaped uterus when empty. Common genital pore ventral, dextral to distal chamber of MCO. Vaginal pore sinistroventral at level of seminal vesicle. Vaginal vestibule delicate; vaginal sclerite with distal funnel and two comparatively large juxtaposed thick-walled chambers; seminal receptacle subspherical, immediately proximal to vagina and anterior to ootype. Bilateral and common vitelline ducts at level of ootype; vitellarium absent in regions of other reproductive organs, otherwise dense throughout trunk.

Kritsky, Bakenhaster & Adams concluded that Pseudorhabdosynochus americanus is easily distinguished from its congeners that infect groupers in the western Atlantic region by its unique vaginal sclerite consisting of a distal funnel and two comparatively large juxtaposed thick-walled chambers.

== Hosts and localities ==
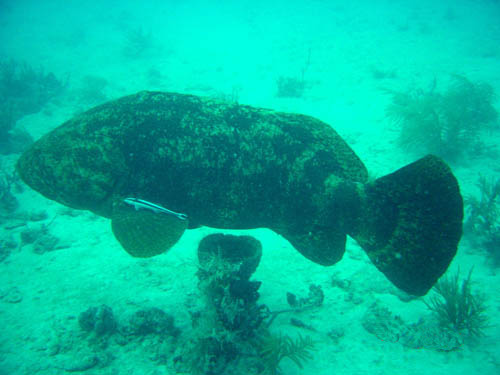
The Atlantic goliath grouper (Epinephelus itajira) is the type-host and probably only host of Pseudorhabdosynochus americanus

The type-host of Pseudorhabdosynochus americanus is the Atlantic goliath grouper (Epinephelus itajira). Kritsky, Bakenhaster & Adams in 2015 listed a number of unconfirmed and erroneous host and locality records and concluded that the Atlantic goliath grouper is likely the only natural host for P. americanus.
