= Pseudorhabdosynochus querni =

Scientific classification
- Kingdom: Animalia
- Phylum: Platyhelminthes
- Class: Monogenea
- Order: Dactylogyridea
- Family: Diplectanidae
- Genus: Pseudorhabdosynochus
- Species: P. querni

Binomial name
- Pseudorhabdosynochus querni (Yamaguti, S., 1968) Kritsky & Beverley-Burton, 1986

Species of worm

Pseudorhabdosynochus querni is a species of diplectanid monogenean parasitic on the gills of the grouper Epinephelus quernus. It was described in 1968 by Satyu Yamaguti under the name Diplectanum querni and transferred to the genus Pseudorhabdosynochus in 1986. The species has been redescribed in 2005 from the type-material.

== Description ==
Pseudorhabdosynochus querni is a small monogenean, 0.45-0.7 mm in length. The species has the general characteristics of other species of Pseudorhabdosynochus, with a flat body and a posterior haptor, which is the organ by which the monogenean attaches itself to the gill of is host. The haptor bears two squamodiscs, one ventral and one dorsal. The sclerotized male copulatory organ, or "quadriloculate organ", has the shape of a bean with four internal chambers, as in other species of Pseudorhabdosynochus. The vagina includes a sclerotized part, which is a complex structure.

== Etymology ==
The specific epithet of the species, querni, is not clearly explained in the original publication, but obviously refers to the name of the host fish, Epinephelus quernus.

== Hosts and localities ==
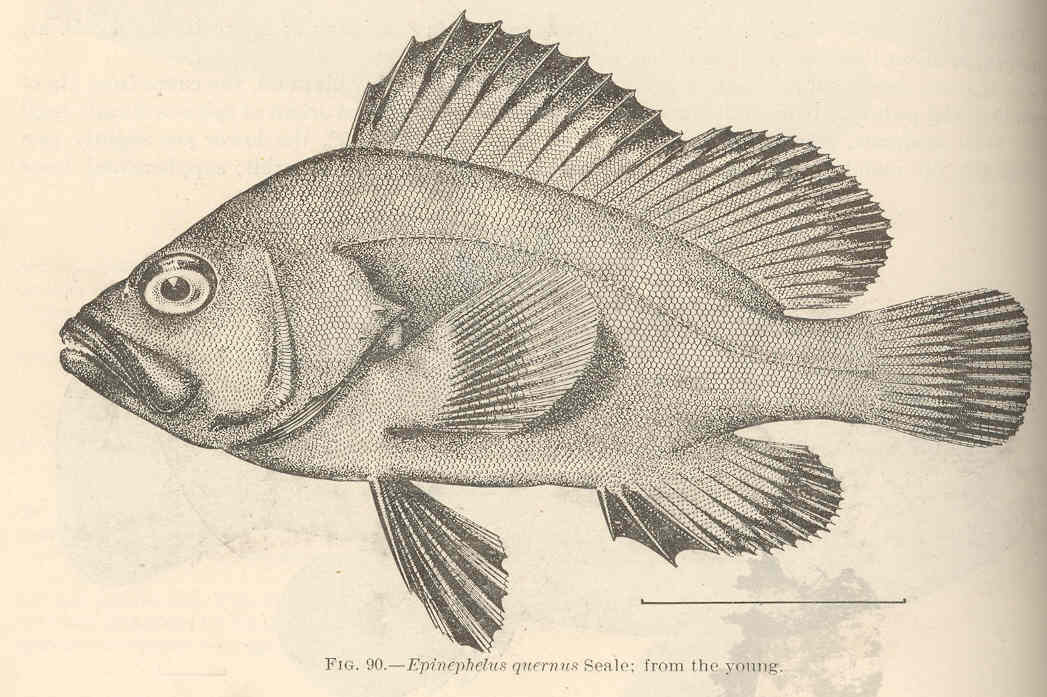
The Hawaiian grouper Hyporthodus quernus is the type-host of Pseudorhabdosynochus querni

The type-locality is off Hawaii and the type-host is the Hawaiian grouper Epinephelus quernus (recently classified as Hyporthodus quernus).
