= Pseudorhabdosynochus magnisquamodiscum =

Scientific classification
- Kingdom: Animalia
- Phylum: Platyhelminthes
- Class: Monogenea
- Order: Dactylogyridea
- Family: Diplectanidae
- Genus: Pseudorhabdosynochus
- Species: P. magnisquamodiscum

Binomial name
- Pseudorhabdosynochus magnisquamodiscum (Aljoshkina, 1984) Santos, Buchmann & Gibson, 2000

Species of worm

Pseudorhabdosynochus magnisquamodiscum is species of diplectanid monogenean parasitic on the gills of a fish. It was described in 1984 under the name Cycloplectanum magnisquamodiscum and later transferred to the genus Pseudorhabdosynochus.

== Description ==
Pseudorhabdosynochus magnisquamodiscum is a small monogenean. The species has the general characteristics of other species of Pseudorhabdosynochus, with a flat body and a posterior haptor, which is the organ by which the monogenean attaches itself to the gill of is host. The haptor bears two squamodiscs, one ventral and one dorsal. The sclerotized male copulatory organ, or "quadriloculate organ", has the shape of a bean with four internal chambers, as in other species of Pseudorhabdosynochus.

== Host ==
The type-host is the four-banded butterflyfish Chaetodon hoefleri. Most other species of the genus Pseudorhabdosynochus have been found on grouper (family Serranidae), and no other Pseudorhabdosynochus species has ever been recorded from a butterflyfish. It has been suggested that the host record was either accidental or erroneous.
