= Pseudorhabdosynochus vagampullum =

Scientific classification
- Kingdom: Animalia
- Phylum: Platyhelminthes
- Class: Monogenea
- Order: Dactylogyridea
- Family: Diplectanidae
- Genus: Pseudorhabdosynochus
- Species: P. vagampullum

Binomial name
- Pseudorhabdosynochus vagampullum (Young, 1969) Kritsky & Beverley-Burton, 1986

Species of worm

Pseudorhabdosynochus vagampullum is a species of diplectanid monogenean parasitic on the gills of a grouper. It was described in 1969, from eight specimens, under the name Diplectanum vagampullum and transferred to the genus Pseudorhabdosynochus in 1986. The species has been redescribed several times.

== Description ==
Pseudorhabdosynochus vagampullum is a small monogenean, 0.4-0.5 mm in length. The species has the general characteristics of other species of Pseudorhabdosynochus, with a flat body and a posterior haptor, which is the organ by which the monogenean attaches itself to the gill of is host. The haptor bears two squamodiscs, one ventral and one dorsal. The sclerotized male copulatory organ, or "quadriloculate organ", has the shape of a bean with four internal chambers, as in other species of Pseudorhabdosynochus. The vagina includes a sclerotized part, which is a complex structure.

== Hosts and localities ==
The type-locality is off Heron Island, Queensland, Australia. The host in the original description of Pseudorhabdosynochus vagampullum is Epinephelus merra. However, Justine, Dupoux & Cribb (2009) showed that the identification of the host was erroneous and that the type-host and only host was Epinephelus quoyanus. In addition to Australia, the species has also been recorded from the coasts of China.
