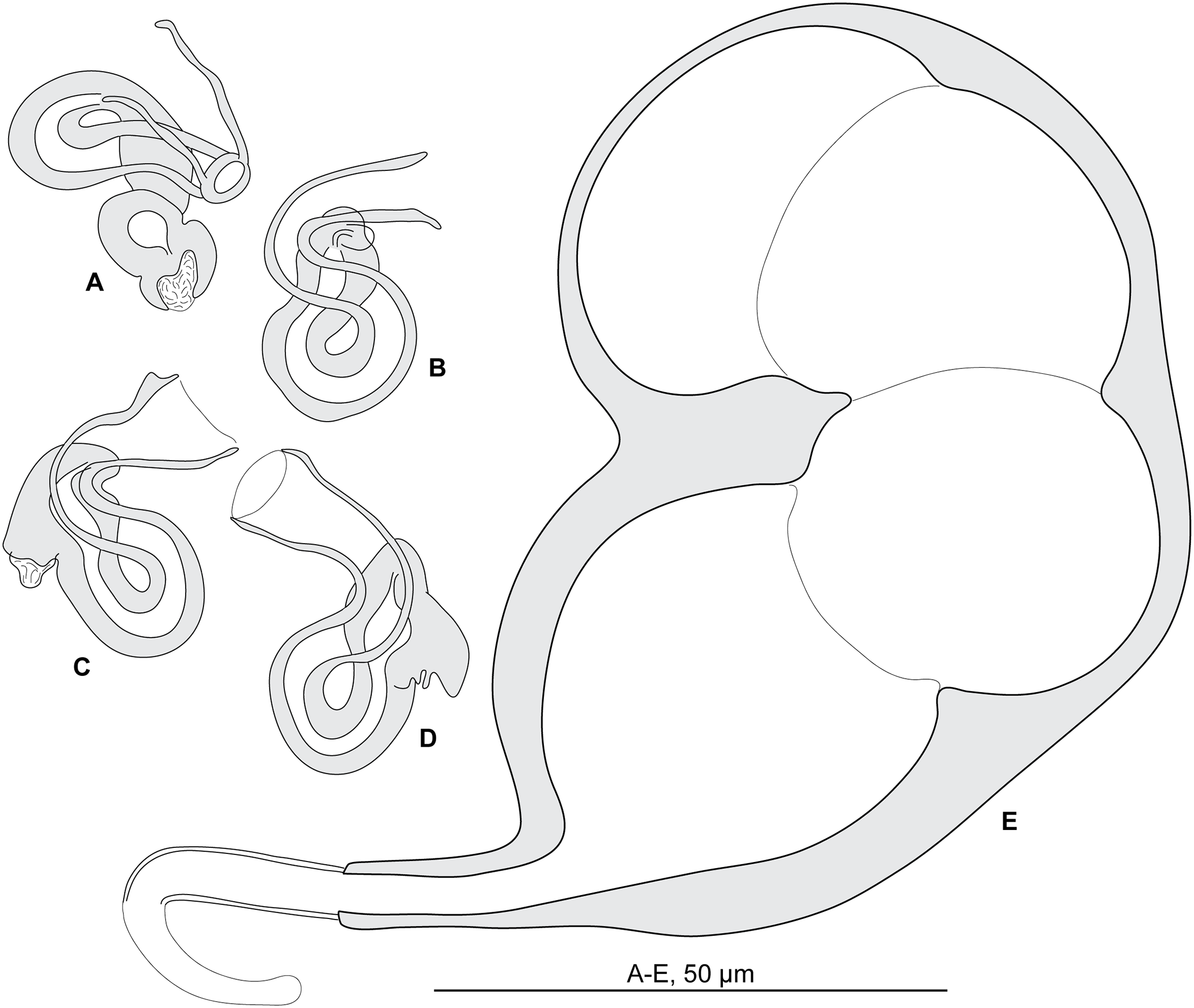
- Pseudorhabdosynochus sinediscus : female (left) and male (right) sclerotised organs

Scientific classification
- Kingdom: Animalia
- Phylum: Platyhelminthes
- Class: Monogenea
- Order: Dactylogyridea
- Family: Diplectanidae
- Genus: Pseudorhabdosynochus
- Species: P. sinediscus

Binomial name
- Pseudorhabdosynochus sinediscus Neifar & Euzet, 2007

= Pseudorhabdosynochus sinediscus =

Species of flatworm

Pseudorhabdosynochus sinediscus is a diplectanid monogenean parasitic on the gills of groupers. It has been described in 2007 by Lassad Neifar & Louis Euzet. The name refers to the absence of squamodiscs and is derived from the Latin "sine", indicating absence, and "discus", contraction of "squamodiscus".

The species has been redescribed by Amira Chaabane, Lassad Neifar, and Jean-Lou Justine in 2017 from the type material and additional specimens from Tunisia.

== Description ==
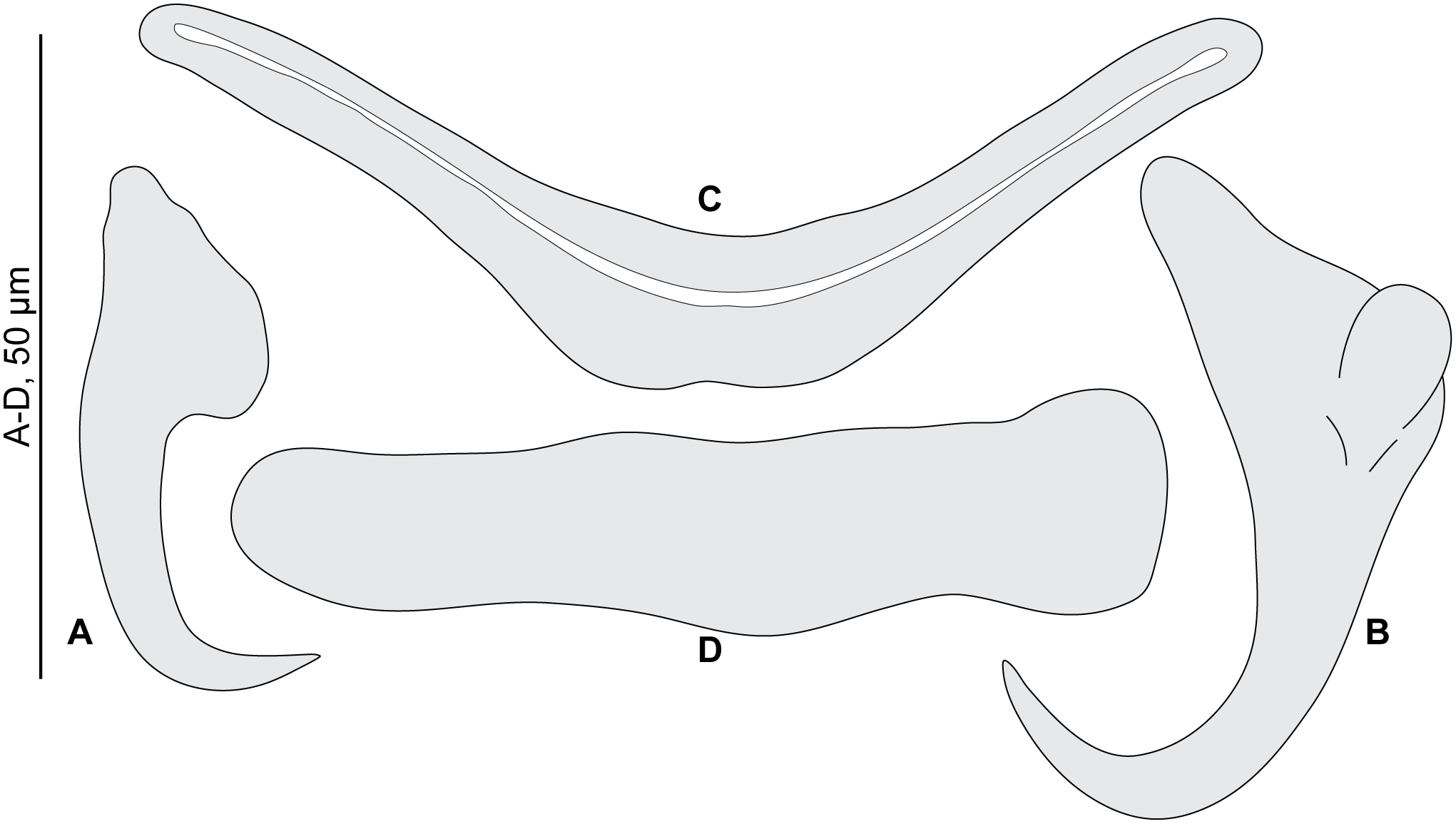
Pseudorhabdosynochus sinediscus, haptoral parts; note that no squamodisc is present

Pseudorhabdosynochus sinediscus is a small monogenean. The species has the general characteristics of other species of Pseudorhabdosynochus, with a flat body and a posterior haptor, which is the organ by which the monogenean attaches itself to the gill of is host. The sclerotized male copulatory organ, or "quadriloculate organ", has the shape of a bean with four internal chambers, as in other species of Pseudorhabdosynochus. The vagina includes a sclerotized part, which is a complex structure.

In contrast to most species of Pseudorhabdosynochus in which the haptor bears two squamodiscs, one ventral and one dorsal, the haptor of Pseudorhabdosynochus sinediscus is devoid of squamodiscs. This is the only species of Pseudorhabdosynochus with this characteristic.

== Hosts and localities ==
The goldblotch grouper Mycteroperca costae is the type-host of Pseudorhabdosynochus sinediscus. The type-locality is the Mediterranean Sea off Tunisia.
