= Pseudorhabdosynochus anulus =

Scientific classification
- Kingdom: Animalia
- Phylum: Platyhelminthes
- Class: Monogenea
- Order: Dactylogyridea
- Family: Diplectanidae
- Genus: Pseudorhabdosynochus
- Species: P. anulus

Binomial name
- Pseudorhabdosynochus anulus Mendoza-Franco, Violante-González & Herrera, 2011

Species of flatworm

Pseudorhabdosynochus anulus is a diplectanid monogenean parasitic on the gills of groupers. It was described in 2011.

== Etymology ==
The specific epithet, anulus, is derived from the Latin for "a ring", referring to "the morphology of the internal structure of the end of the distal compartment of the MCO."

== Description ==
Pseudorhabdosynochus anulus is a small monogenean. The species has the general characteristics of other species of Pseudorhabdosynochus, with a flat body and a posterior haptor, which is the organ by which the monogenean attaches itself to the gill of is host. The haptor bears two squamodiscs, one ventral and one dorsal. The sclerotized male copulatory organ, or "quadriloculate organ", has the shape of a bean with four internal chambers, as in other species of Pseudorhabdosynochus. The vagina includes a sclerotized part, which is a complex structure.

== Hosts and localities ==
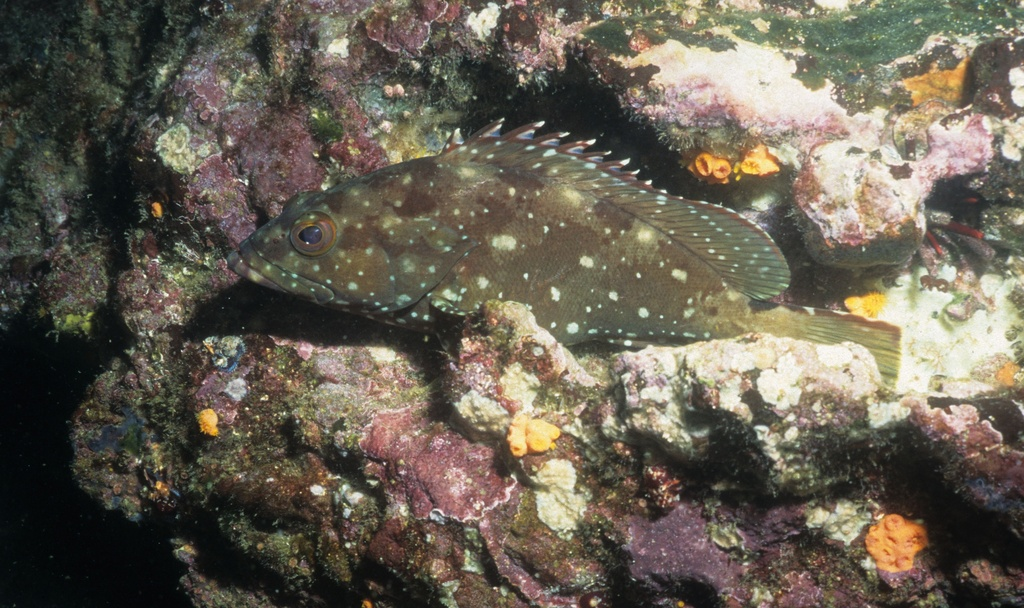
Epinephelus labriformis is the host of Pseudorhabdosynochus anulus

The starry grouper Epinephelus labriformis is the type-host of Pseudorhabdosynochus anulus. The type-locality is Taboga Island in Panama. The species has also been found off the Pacific coast of Mexico.
