= Pseudorhabdosynochus spirani =

Scientific classification
- Kingdom: Animalia
- Phylum: Platyhelminthes
- Class: Monogenea
- Order: Dactylogyridea
- Family: Diplectanidae
- Genus: Pseudorhabdosynochus
- Species: P. spirani

Binomial name
- Pseudorhabdosynochus spirani Mendoza-Franco, Violante-González & Herrera, 2011

Species of flatworm

Pseudorhabdosynochus spirani is a diplectanid monogenean parasitic on the gills of groupers. It was described in 2011.

== Description ==
Pseudorhabdosynochus spirani is a small monogenean. The species has the general characteristics of other species of Pseudorhabdosynochus, with a flat body and a posterior haptor, which is the organ by which the monogenean attaches itself to the gill of is host. The haptor bears two squamodiscs, one ventral and one dorsal. The sclerotized male copulatory organ, or "quadriloculate organ", has the shape of a bean with four internal chambers, as in other species of Pseudorhabdosynochus. The vagina includes a sclerotized part, which is a complex structure.

== Hosts and localities ==
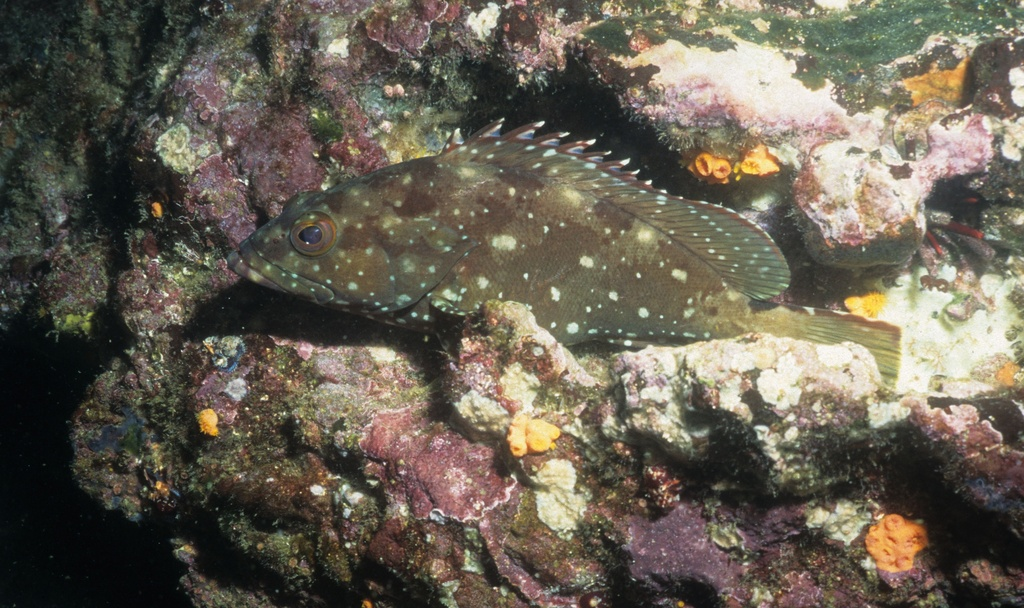
Epinephelus labriformis is the host of Pseudorhabdosynochus spirani

The starry grouper Epinephelus labriformis is the type-host of Pseudorhabdosynochus spirani, and the type-locality is Cantiles de Mozimba in Acapulco, Guerrero, Pacific coast or Mexico. The species has also been found on the same fish off the Pearl Islands and Taboga Island in Panama.
