= Pseudorhabdosynochus shenzhenensis =

Scientific classification
- Kingdom: Animalia
- Phylum: Platyhelminthes
- Class: Monogenea
- Order: Dactylogyridea
- Family: Diplectanidae
- Genus: Pseudorhabdosynochus
- Species: P. shenzhenensis

Binomial name
- Pseudorhabdosynochus shenzhenensis Yang, Zeng & Gibson, 2005

Species of worm

Pseudorhabdosynochus shenzhenensis is a species of diplectanid monogenean parasitic on the gills of the grouper Epinephelus coioides. It was described in 2005.

== Description ==
Pseudorhabdosynochus shenzhenensis is a small monogenean, 0.3-0.5 mm in length. The species has the general characteristics of other species of Pseudorhabdosynochus, with a flat body and a posterior haptor, which is the organ by which the monogenean attaches itself to the gill of is host. The haptor bears two squamodiscs, one ventral and one dorsal. The sclerotized male copulatory organ, or "quadriloculate organ", has the shape of a bean with four internal chambers, as in other species of Pseudorhabdosynochus. The vagina includes a sclerotized part, which is a complex structure.

== Etymology ==
The name of the species, shenzhenensis, refers to "the name of the city within which the type locality, Dapeng Bay, administratively belongs".

== Hosts and localities ==
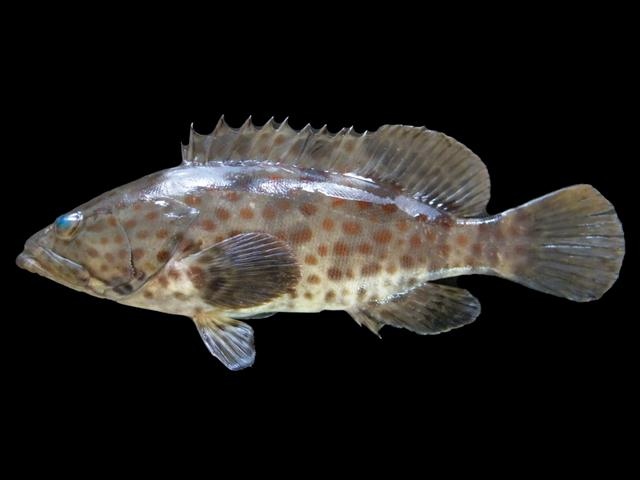
The orange-spotted grouper Epinephelus coioides, the host of Pseudorhabdosynochus shenzhenensis

The type-locality is Dapeng Bay, South China Sea, off Nan’ao, Shenzhen, Guangdong Province, China (23°25'N, 11°82'E), and the type-host is Epinephelus coioides.
