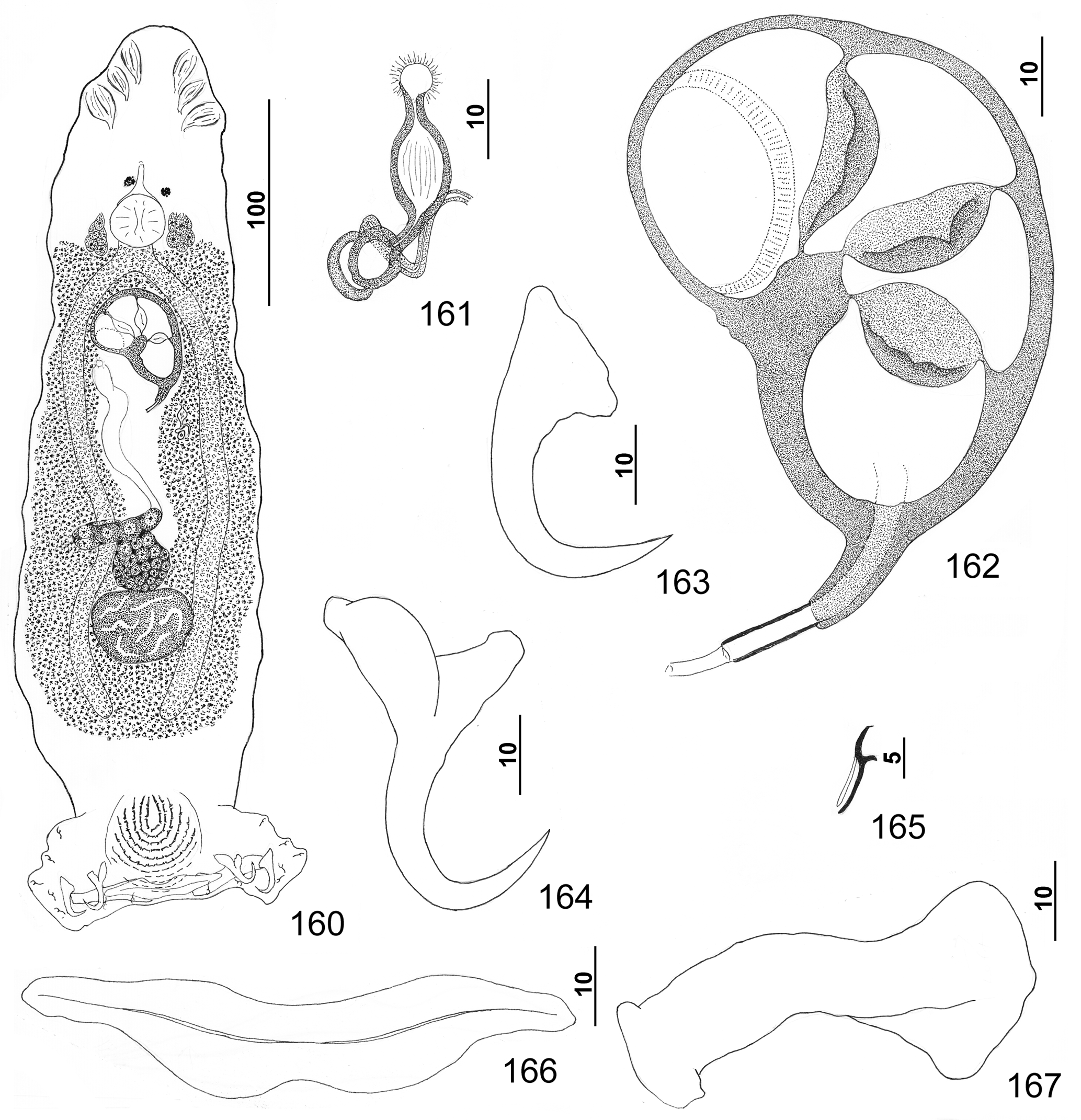
- Body and sclerotised parts

Scientific classification
- Kingdom: Animalia
- Phylum: Platyhelminthes
- Class: Monogenea
- Order: Dactylogyridea
- Family: Diplectanidae
- Genus: Pseudorhabdosynochus
- Species: P. tumeovagina

Binomial name
- Pseudorhabdosynochus tumeovagina Kritsky, Bakenhaster & Adams, 2015

= Pseudorhabdosynochus tumeovagina =

Species of flatworm

Pseudorhabdosynochus tumeovagina is a diplectanid monogenean parasitic on the gills of the speckled hind, Epinephelus drummondhayi. It has been described by Kritsky, Bakenhaster and Adams in 2015.

== Description ==
Pseudorhabdosynochus tumeovagina is a small monogenean, 0.4-0.7 mm in length. The species has the general characteristics of other species of Pseudorhabdosynochus, with a flat body and a posterior haptor, which is the organ by which the monogenean attaches itself to the gill of is host. The haptor bears two squamodiscs, one ventral and one dorsal. The sclerotized male copulatory organ, or "quadriloculate organ", has the shape of a bean with four internal chambers, as in other species of Pseudorhabdosynochus. The vagina includes a sclerotized part, which is a complex structure.
Kritsky, Bakenhaster & Adams (2015) noted that the species was based on specimens obtained from one of two speckled hind examined for gill parasites and held in the ichthyology collection of the Florida Fish and Wildlife Conservation Commission. The infected speckled hind was collected in 1972 and was not fixed and preserved with its external parasites in mind. As a result, the specimens of Pseudorhabdosynochus tumeovagina from this fish were in generally poor shape, and many of the internal features, particularly those of the male and female reproductive systems, could not be determined. Nonetheless, the unique vaginal sclerite clearly indicated the species to be new to science.

== Etymology ==
According to Kritsky, Bakenhaster & Adams (2015), the specific name of Pseudorhabdosynochus tumeovagina is from Latin (tume/o = to be inflated + vagina) and refers to the bulbous portion of the distal tube of the vaginal sclerite.

== Diagnosis ==
Kritsky, Bakenhaster & Adams (2015) wrote that Pseudorhabdosynochus tumeovagina is differentiated from all previously described species of Pseudorhabdosynochus from the region by having an expanded (bulbous) distal tube and a small chamber of the vaginal sclerite. It most closely resembles Pseudorhabdosynochus williamsi, by possessing a male copulatory organ having an elongate and curved distal cone and comparatively thick-walled chambers. Pseudorhabdosynochus tumeovagina differs from P. williamsi in the morphology of the distal tube of the vaginal sclerite (bulbous expansion of the distal tube lacking in P. williamsi).

== Hosts and localities ==
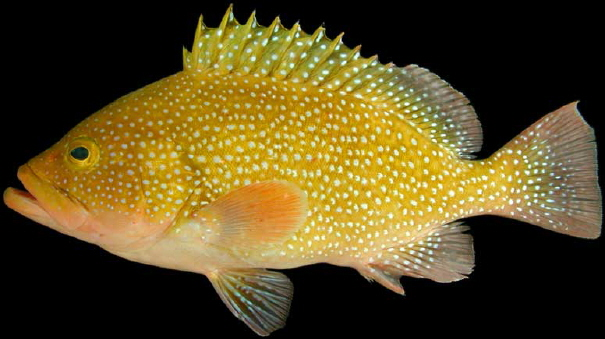
The speckled hind, Epinephelus drummondhayi, is the type-host of Pseudorhabdosynochus tumeovagina.

The type-host and only recorded host of Pseudorhabdosynochus tumeovagina is the speckled hind, Epinephelus drummondhayi (Serranidae: Epinephelinae). The type-locality and only recorded locality is Florida Middle Grounds, Gulf of Mexico.
