= Pseudorhabdosynochus guerreroensis =

Scientific classification
- Kingdom: Animalia
- Phylum: Platyhelminthes
- Class: Monogenea
- Order: Dactylogyridea
- Family: Diplectanidae
- Genus: Pseudorhabdosynochus
- Species: P. guerreroensis

Binomial name
- Pseudorhabdosynochus guerreroensis Mendoza-Franco, Violante-González & Herrera, 2011

Species of flatworm

Pseudorhabdosynochus guerreroensis is a diplectanid monogenean parasitic on the gills of groupers. It has been described in 2011.

== Description ==
Pseudorhabdosynochus guerreroensis is a small monogenean. The species has the general characteristics of other species of Pseudorhabdosynochus, with a flat body and a posterior haptor, which is the organ by which the monogenean attaches itself to the gill of is host. The haptor bears two squamodiscs, one ventral and one dorsal. The sclerotized male copulatory organ, or "quadriloculate organ", has the shape of a bean with four internal chambers, as in other species of Pseudorhabdosynochus. The vagina includes a sclerotized part, which is a complex structure.

== Hosts and localities ==
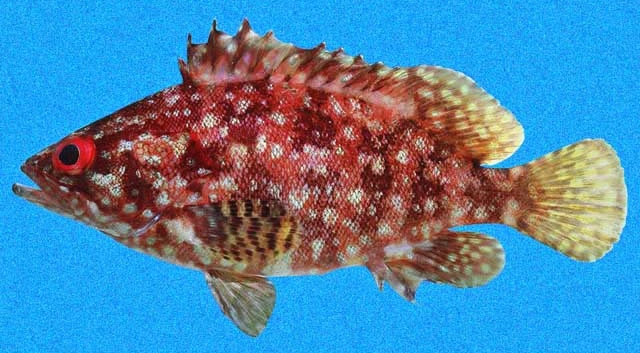
Alphestes immaculatus is the type-host of Pseudorhabdosynochus guerreroensis

The Pacific mutton hamlet Alphestes immaculatus is the type-host of Pseudorhabdosynochus guerreroensis, and the type-locality is Cantiles de Mozimba in Acapulco, Guerrero, Mexico, hence the species name (guerreroensis is a reference to Guerrero). The species has also been found on the Rivulated mutton hamlet Alphestes multiguttatus and the spotted grouper Epinephelus analogus.
