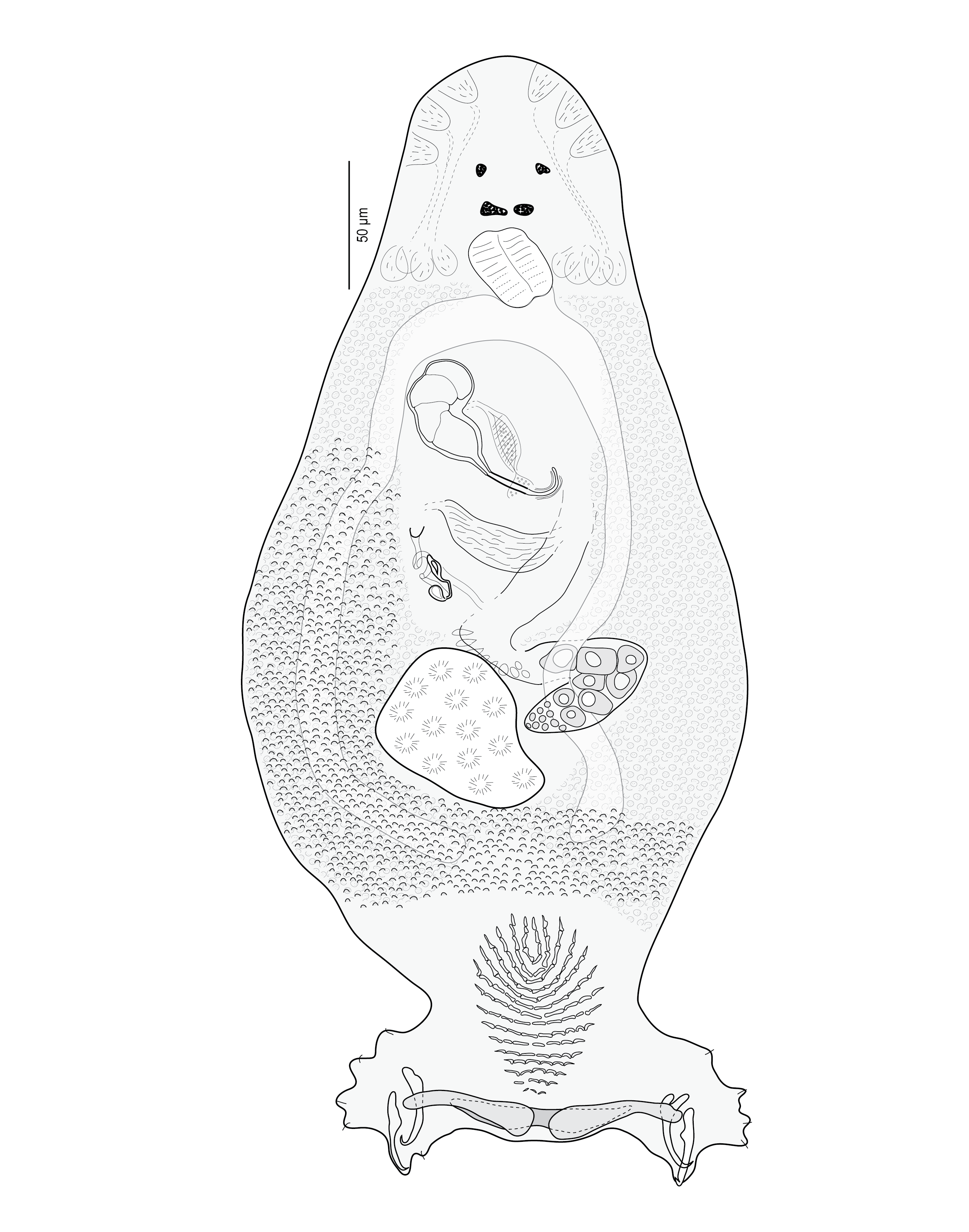

Scientific classification
- Kingdom: Animalia
- Phylum: Platyhelminthes
- Class: Monogenea
- Order: Dactylogyridea
- Family: Diplectanidae
- Genus: Pseudorhabdosynochus
- Species: P. hirundineus

Binomial name
- Pseudorhabdosynochus hirundineus Justine, 2005

= Pseudorhabdosynochus hirundineus =

Species of flatworm

Pseudorhabdosynochus hirundineus is a diplectanid monogenean parasitic on the gills of the yellow-edged lyretail, Variola louti. It was described in 2005.

== Description ==
Pseudorhabdosynochus hirundineus is a small monogenean, 0.3-0.5 mm in length. The species has the general characteristics of other species of Pseudorhabdosynochus, with a flat body and a posterior haptor, which is the organ by which the monogenean attaches itself to the gill of is host. The haptor bears two squamodiscs, one ventral and one dorsal. The sclerotized male copulatory organ, or "quadriloculate organ", has the shape of a bean with four internal chambers, as in other species of Pseudorhabdosynochus. The vagina includes a sclerotized part, which is a complex structure.

== Etymology ==
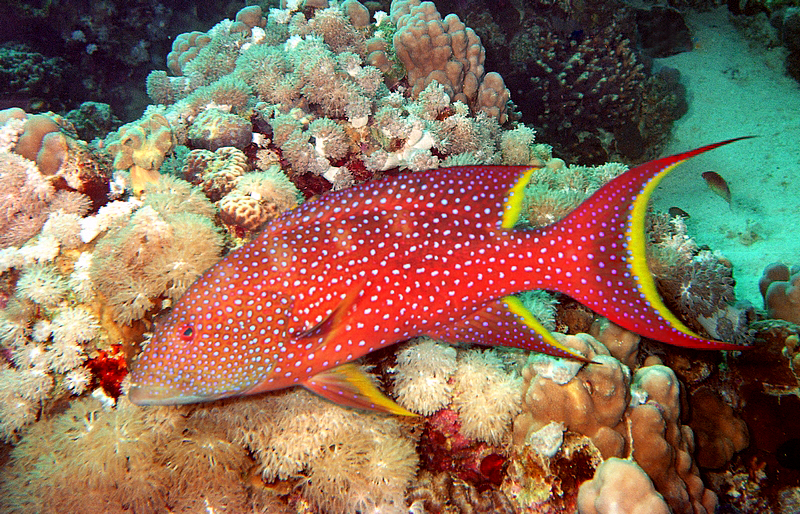
The yellow-edged lyretail, Variola louti is the host of Pseudorhabdosynochus hirundineus

The name hirundineus (Latin for ‘of swallows’) was chosen after the local New Caledonian name of the host Variola louti, ‘‘saumonée hirondelle’’ (French for ‘swallow grouper’) which refers to the tail of the fish, which resembles that of a swallow.

== Hosts and localities ==
The type-locality is the Barrier Reef off Nouméa, New Caledonia. The type-host is the yellow-edged lyretail, Variola louti.
