= Pseudorhabdosynochus venus =

Scientific classification
- Kingdom: Animalia
- Phylum: Platyhelminthes
- Class: Monogenea
- Order: Dactylogyridea
- Family: Diplectanidae
- Genus: Pseudorhabdosynochus
- Species: P. venus

Binomial name
- Pseudorhabdosynochus venus Hinsinger & Justine, 2006

Species of flatworm

Pseudorhabdosynochus venus is a diplectanid monogenean parasitic on the gills of the grouper Epinephelus howlandi. It has been described in 2006.

== Description ==
Pseudorhabdosynochus venus is a small monogenean, 0.5 mm-1 mm in length. The species has the general characteristics of other species of Pseudorhabdosynochus, with a flat body and a posterior haptor, which is the organ by which the monogenean attaches itself to the gill of is host. The haptor bears two squamodiscs, one ventral and one dorsal. The sclerotized male copulatory organ, or "quadriloculate organ", has the shape of a bean with four internal chambers, as in other species of Pseudorhabdosynochus.

The vagina includes a sclerotized part, which is a complex structure. It comprises an anterior open trumpet, an S-shaped canal, a tear-shaped principal chamber and a spherical accessory chamber; all parts are heavily sclerotised.

== Etymology ==
Pseudorhabdosynochus venus was named for Venus, the mythological goddess of love and beauty, as "a reference to the spectacular and beautiful sclerotised vagina".

== Hosts and localities ==
The type-host and only recorded host of P. venus is the grouper Epinephelus howlandi (Serranidae: Epinephelinae). The type-locality and only recorded locality is off Nouméa, New Caledonia.
