= Pseudorhabdosynochus chinensis =

Scientific classification
- Kingdom: Animalia
- Phylum: Platyhelminthes
- Class: Monogenea
- Order: Dactylogyridea
- Family: Diplectanidae
- Genus: Pseudorhabdosynochus
- Species: P. chinensis

Binomial name
- Pseudorhabdosynochus chinensis Zhang & Liu, 2001

Species of flatworm

Pseudorhabdosynochus chinensis is a species of diplectanid monogenean parasitic on the gills of the greasy grouper, Epinephelus tauvina. It was described in 2001.

== Description ==
Pseudorhabdosynochus chinensis is a small monogenean, 0.6-1.7 mm in length. The species has the general characteristics of other species of Pseudorhabdosynochus, with a flat body and a posterior haptor, which is the organ by which the monogenean attaches itself to the gill of is host. The haptor bears two squamodiscs, one ventral and one dorsal.

The sclerotized male copulatory organ, or "quadriloculate organ", has the shape of a bean with four internal chambers, as in other species of Pseudorhabdosynochus.

The vagina includes a sclerotized part, which is a complex structure.

== Etymology ==
The species epithet refers to the country where the species was found, China.

== Hosts and localities ==
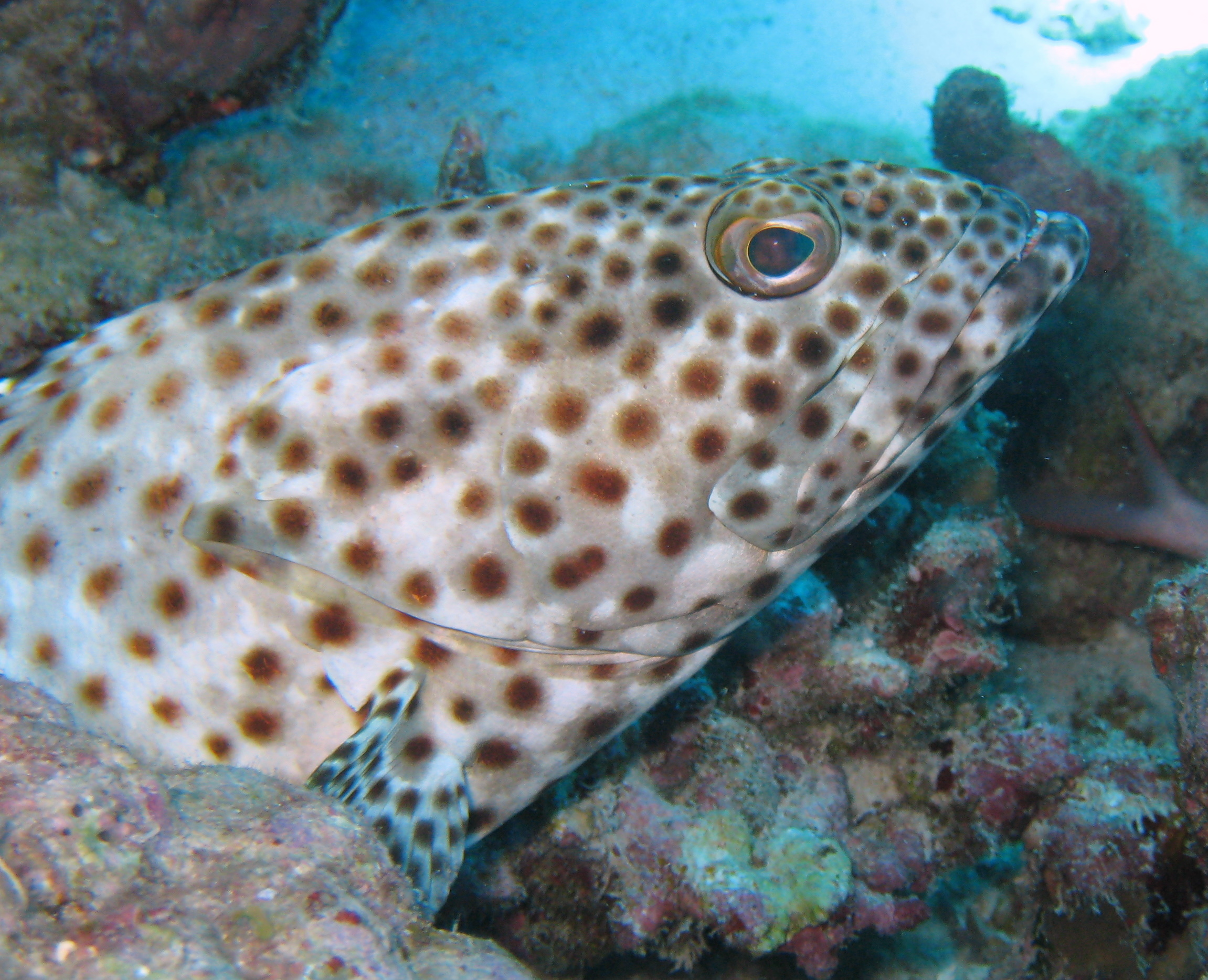
The greasy grouper, Epinephelus tauvina, is the type-host of Pseudorhabdosynochus chinensis

The type-locality is off China. The type-host is the greasy grouper, Epinephelus tauvina.
