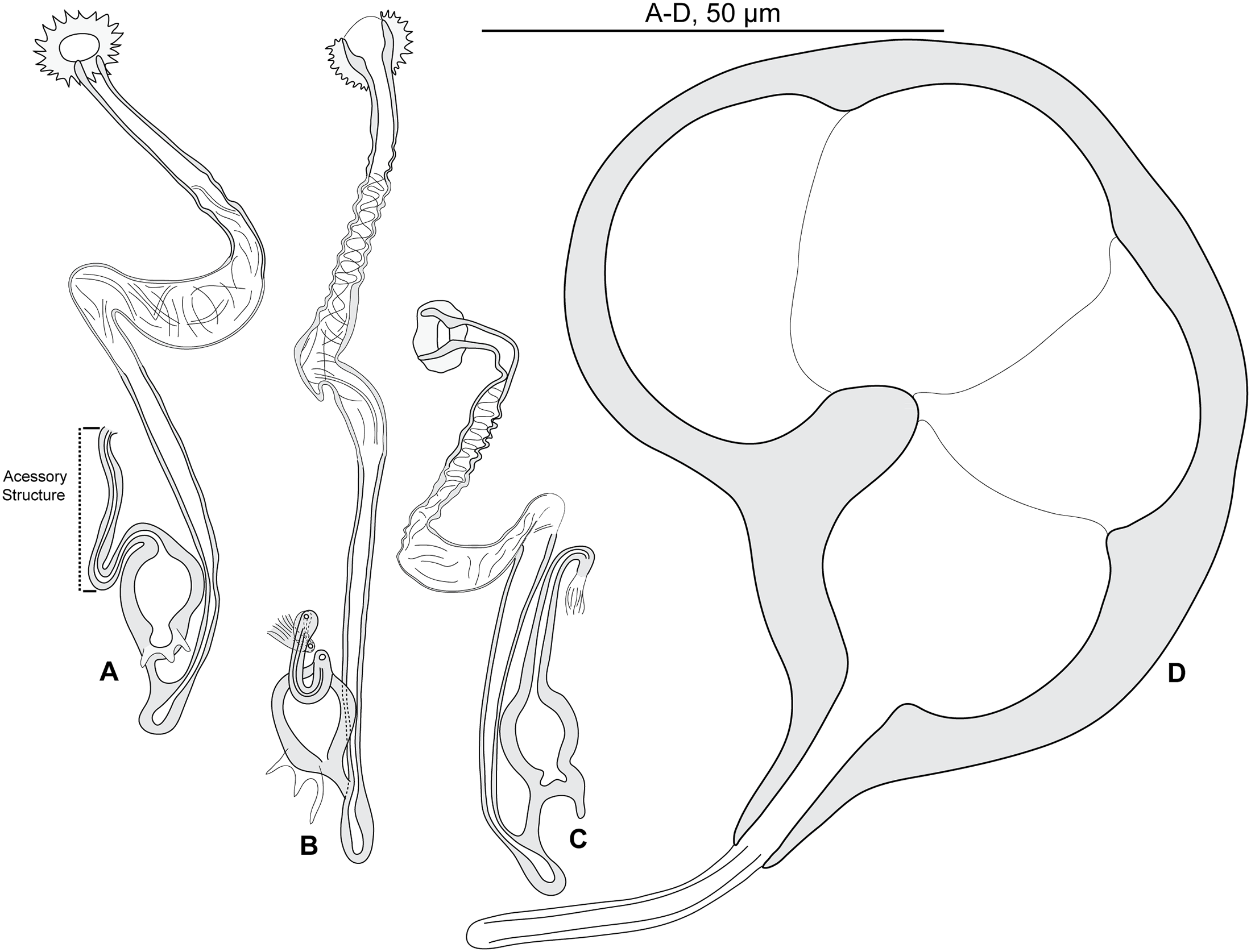
- Pseudorhabdosynochus dolicocolpos - female (left) and male (right) sclerotised organs

Scientific classification
- Kingdom: Animalia
- Phylum: Platyhelminthes
- Class: Monogenea
- Order: Dactylogyridea
- Family: Diplectanidae
- Genus: Pseudorhabdosynochus
- Species: P. dolicocolpos

Binomial name
- Pseudorhabdosynochus dolicocolpos Neifar & Euzet, 2007

= Pseudorhabdosynochus dolicocolpos =

Species of flatworm

Pseudorhabdosynochus dolicocolpos is a diplectanid monogenean parasitic on the gills of groupers. It has been described in 2007 by Lassad Neifar & Louis Euzet. The species name refers to the size of the vagina and is derived from the Greek words "dolicos" meaning long and "colpos" vagina. The species has been redescribed by Amira Chaabane, Lassad Neifar, and Jean-Lou Justine in 2017.

== Etymology ==
The specific epithet is derived from the Greek words dolicos, "long", and colpos, "vagina", referring to the size of the species' vagina.

== Description ==
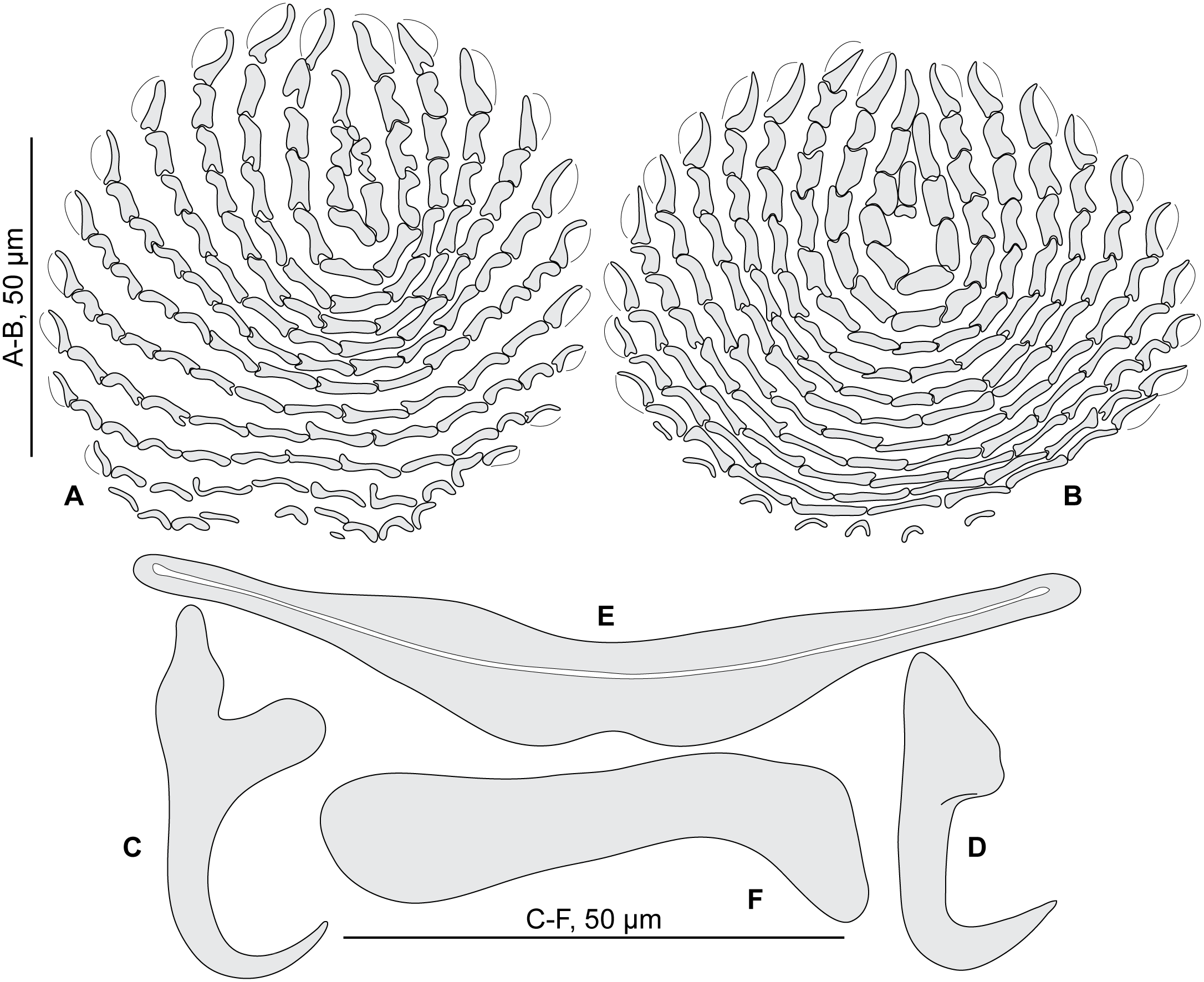
Pseudorhabdosynochus dolicocolpos, squamodiscs and haptoral parts

Pseudorhabdosynochus dolicocolpos is a small monogenean. The species has the general characteristics of other species of Pseudorhabdosynochus, with a flat body and a posterior haptor, which is the organ by which the monogenean attaches itself to the gill of is host. The haptor bears two squamodiscs, one ventral and one dorsal. The sclerotized male copulatory organ, or "quadriloculate organ", has the shape of a bean with four internal chambers, as in other species of Pseudorhabdosynochus. The vagina includes a sclerotized part, which is a complex structure.

Chaabane, Neifar, and Justine, in 2017 considered that no species of Pseudorhabdosynochus in the Mediterranean Sea had a sclerotized vagina similar to that of P. dolicocolpos, and that the closest species in morphology was Pseudorhabdosynochus variabilis Justine, 2008, a gill parasite of the grouper Mycteroperca morrhua off New Caledonia.

== Hosts and localities ==
The goldblotch grouper Mycteroperca costae is the type-host of Pseudorhabdosynochus dolicocolpos. The type-locality is the Mediterranean Sea off Sfax, Tunisia.
