= Pseudorhabdosynochus pai =

Scientific classification
- Kingdom: Animalia
- Phylum: Platyhelminthes
- Class: Monogenea
- Order: Dactylogyridea
- Family: Diplectanidae
- Genus: Pseudorhabdosynochus
- Species: P. pai

Binomial name
- Pseudorhabdosynochus pai Justine & Vignon, 2009

Species of flatworm

Pseudorhabdosynochus pai is a diplectanid monogenean parasitic on the gills of the greasy grouper, Epinephelus tauvina. It was described in 2009.

== Description ==
Pseudorhabdosynochus pai is a small monogenean, 0.3-0.7 mm in length. The species has the general characteristics of other species of Pseudorhabdosynochus, with a flat body and a posterior haptor, which is the organ by which the monogenean attaches itself to the gill of is host. The haptor bears two squamodiscs, one ventral and one dorsal.

The sclerotized male copulatory organ, or "quadriloculate organ", has the shape of a bean with four internal chambers, as in other species of Pseudorhabdosynochus but Pseudorhabdosynochus pai is characterised by an extremely developed male quadriloculate organ: its total length is 140 μm and thus the species appears to have the largest quadriloculate organ of all species in the genus. The vagina includes a sclerotized part, which is a complex structure.

== Etymology ==
The authors indicated that Pai is a legendary (male) hero of Moorea.

== Hosts and localities ==
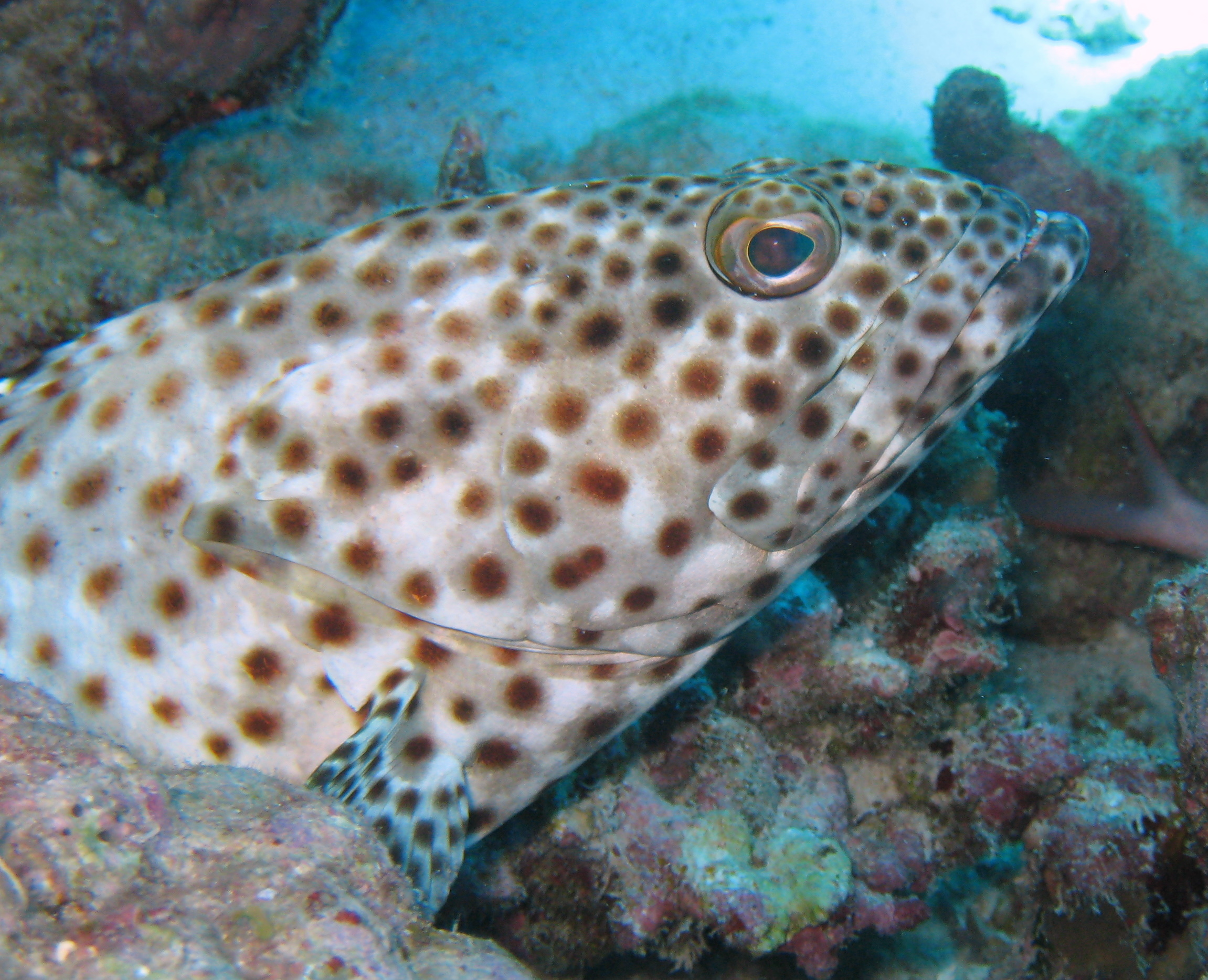
The greasy grouper, Epinephelus tauvina, is the type-host of Pseudorhabdosynochus pai

The type-locality is off Moorea, French Polynesia. The type-host is the greasy grouper, Epinephelus tauvina.
