= Pseudorhabdosynochus minutus =

Scientific classification
- Kingdom: Animalia
- Phylum: Platyhelminthes
- Class: Monogenea
- Order: Dactylogyridea
- Family: Diplectanidae
- Genus: Pseudorhabdosynochus
- Species: P. minutus

Binomial name
- Pseudorhabdosynochus minutus Justine, 2007

Species of flatworm

Pseudorhabdosynochus minutus is a diplectanid monogenean parasitic on the gills of groupers. It has been described in 2007.

== Description ==
The appellation minutus (Latin for small) refers to the small body size of the species, which is 230–550 μm in length. The species has the general characteristics of other species of Pseudorhabdosynochus, with a flat body and a posterior haptor, which is the norgan by which the monogenean attaches itself to the gill of is host. The haptor bears two squamodiscs, one ventral and one dorsal. The sclerotized male copulatory organ, or "quadriloculate organ", has the shape of a bean with four internal chambers, as in other species of Pseudorhabdosynochus. The vagina includes a sclerotized part, which is a complex structure.

== Hosts and localities ==
The grouper Cephalopholis sonnerati is the type-host of Pseudorhabdosynochus minutus. The type-locality is the barrier reef off Nouméa, New Caledonia.
