= Pseudorhabdosynochus caballeroi =

Scientific classification
- Kingdom: Animalia
- Phylum: Platyhelminthes
- Class: Monogenea
- Order: Dactylogyridea
- Family: Diplectanidae
- Genus: Pseudorhabdosynochus
- Species: P. caballeroi

Binomial name
- Pseudorhabdosynochus caballeroi (Oliver, 1984) Kritsky & Beverley-Burton, 1986

Synonyms
- Cycloplectanum caballeroi Oliver, 1984

Species of flatworm

Pseudorhabdosynochus caballeroi is a diplectanid monogenean parasitic on the gills of fish. It has been described in 1984 by Guy Oliver. The name of the species honours Professor Eduardo Caballero y Caballero, a Mexican parasitologist.

The species was first described as Cycloplectanum caballeroi and transferred to the genus Pseudorhabdosynochus by Delane C. Kritsky and Mary Beverley-Burton in 1986.

== Etymology ==
The specific epithet was given in honor of Prof. Eduardo Caballero of the University of Mexico.

== Description ==
Pseudorhabdosynochus caballeroi is a small monogenean. The species has the general characteristics of other species of Pseudorhabdosynochus, with a flat body and a posterior haptor, which is the organ by which the monogenean attaches itself to the gill of is host. The haptor bears two squamodiscs, one ventral and one dorsal. The sclerotized male copulatory organ, or "quadriloculate organ", has the shape of a bean with four internal chambers, as in other species of Pseudorhabdosynochus. The vagina includes a sclerotized part, which is a complex structure.

== Hosts and localities ==
The giant sea bass Stereolepis gigas is the type-host of Pseudorhabdosynochus caballeroi. The type-locality is the Pacific Ocean off Mexico.
