= Pseudorhabdosynochus argus =

Scientific classification
- Kingdom: Animalia
- Phylum: Platyhelminthes
- Class: Monogenea
- Order: Dactylogyridea
- Family: Diplectanidae
- Genus: Pseudorhabdosynochus
- Species: P. argus

Binomial name
- Pseudorhabdosynochus argus Justine, 2007

Species of flatworm

Pseudorhabdosynochus argus is a diplectanid monogenean parasitic on the gills of groupers. It was described in 2007.

== Etymology ==
The specific epithet is derived from the mythological Argus Panoptes; it was given in reference to the species' type-host, Cephalopholis argus.

== Description ==
Pseudorhabdosynochus argus is a small monogenean. The species has the general characteristics of other species of Pseudorhabdosynochus, with a flat body and a posterior haptor, which is the organ by which the monogenean attaches itself to the gill of is host. The haptor bears two squamodiscs, one ventral and one dorsal. The sclerotized male copulatory organ, or "quadriloculate organ", has the shape of a bean with four internal chambers, as in other species of Pseudorhabdosynochus. The vagina includes a sclerotized part, which is a complex structure.

== Hosts and localities ==
The grouper Cephalopholis argus is the type-host of Pseudorhabdosynochus argus. The type-locality is the barrier reef off Nouméa, New Caledonia. The parasite has also been found in the same fish species near Heron Island, off Australia.
