= Pseudorhabdosynochus bocquetae =

Scientific classification
- Kingdom: Animalia
- Phylum: Platyhelminthes
- Class: Monogenea
- Order: Dactylogyridea
- Family: Diplectanidae
- Genus: Pseudorhabdosynochus
- Species: P. bocquetae

Binomial name
- Pseudorhabdosynochus bocquetae (Oliver & Paperna, 1984) Kritsky & Beverley-Burton, 1986

Synonyms
- Cycloplectanum bocquetae Oliver & Paperna, 1984

Species of flatworm

Pseudorhabdosynochus bocquetae is a diplectanid monogenean parasitic on the gills of groupers. It has been described in 1984 by Guy Oliver and Ilan Paperna. The species was first described as Cycloplectanum bocquetae and transferred to the genus Pseudorhabdosynochus by Delane C. Kritsky and Mary Beverley-Burton in 1986.

== Description ==
Pseudorhabdosynochus bocquetae is a small monogenean. The species has the general characteristics of other species of Pseudorhabdosynochus, with a flat body and a posterior haptor, which is the organ by which the monogenean attaches itself to the gill of is host. The haptor bears two squamodiscs, one ventral and one dorsal. The sclerotized male copulatory organ, or "quadriloculate organ", has the shape of a bean with four internal chambers, as in other species of Pseudorhabdosynochus. The vagina includes a sclerotized part, which is a complex structure.

== Hosts and localities ==
The grouper Epinephelus adscensionis is the type-host of Pseudorhabdosynochus bocquetae. The type-locality is the Red Sea.
