= Pseudorhabdosynochus coioidesis =

Scientific classification
- Kingdom: Animalia
- Phylum: Platyhelminthes
- Class: Monogenea
- Order: Dactylogyridea
- Family: Diplectanidae
- Genus: Pseudorhabdosynochus
- Species: P. coioidesis

Binomial name
- Pseudorhabdosynochus coioidesis Bu, Leong, Wong, Woo & Foo, 1999

Species of flatworm

Pseudorhabdosynochus coioidesis is a diplectanid monogenean parasitic on the gills of groupers. It was described in 1999.

== Description ==
Pseudorhabdosynochus coioidesis is a small monogenean. The species has the general characteristics of other species of Pseudorhabdosynochus, with a flat body and a posterior haptor, which is the organ by which the monogenean attaches itself to the gill of is host. The haptor bears two squamodiscs, one ventral and one dorsal. The sclerotized male copulatory organ, or "quadriloculate organ", has the shape of a bean with four internal chambers, as in other species of Pseudorhabdosynochus. The vagina includes a sclerotized part, which is a complex structure.

== Etymology ==
The specific epithet is based on the name of its host fish Epinephelus coioides.

== Hosts and localities ==
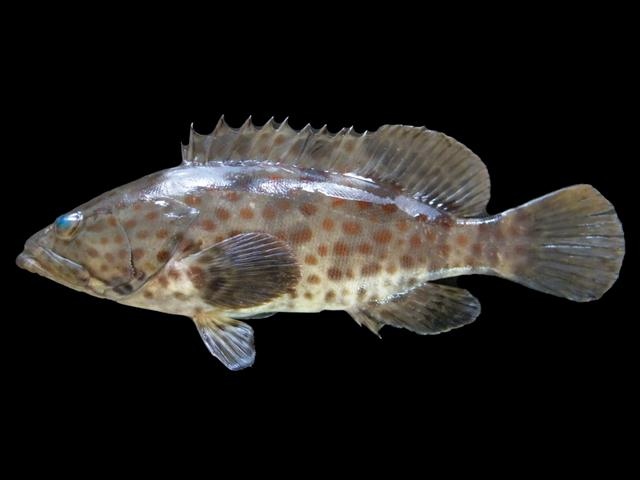
The orange-spotted grouper Epinephelus coioides, the host of Pseudorhabdosynochus coioidesis

The hosts of Pseudorhabdosynochus coioidesis are the groupers Epinephelus coioides (type-host) and Epinephelus aerolatus. The localities are Penang, Kedah, Malaysia, Hong Kong, and Medan, Indonesia.

== Infection in fish ==
The intensity of Pseudorhabdosynochus coioidesis can be as high as 294 monogeneans per fish (Epinephelus coioides) in South China and exhibits seasonal variations.
