= Pseudorhabdosynochus quadratus =

Scientific classification
- Kingdom: Animalia
- Phylum: Platyhelminthes
- Class: Monogenea
- Order: Dactylogyridea
- Family: Diplectanidae
- Genus: Pseudorhabdosynochus
- Species: P. quadratus

Binomial name
- Pseudorhabdosynochus quadratus Schoelinck & Justine, 2011

Species of flatworm

Pseudorhabdosynochus quadratus is a species of diplectanid monogenean that is parasitic on the gills of the white-streaked grouper Epinephelus ongus. It was described in 2011.

== Description ==
Pseudorhabdosynochus quadratus is a small monogenean, 0.3-0.4 mm in length. The species has the general characteristics of other species of Pseudorhabdosynochus, with a flat body and a posterior haptor, which is the organ by which the monogenean attaches itself to the gill of is host. The haptor bears two squamodiscs, one ventral and one dorsal. The sclerotized male copulatory organ, or "quadriloculate organ", has the shape of a bean with four internal chambers, as in other species of Pseudorhabdosynochus.

The vagina includes a sclerotized part, which is a complex structure.

== Etymology ==
The species Pseudorhabdosynochus quadratus was named in reference to the shape of the vagina; quadratus, Latin for square.

== Hosts and localities ==
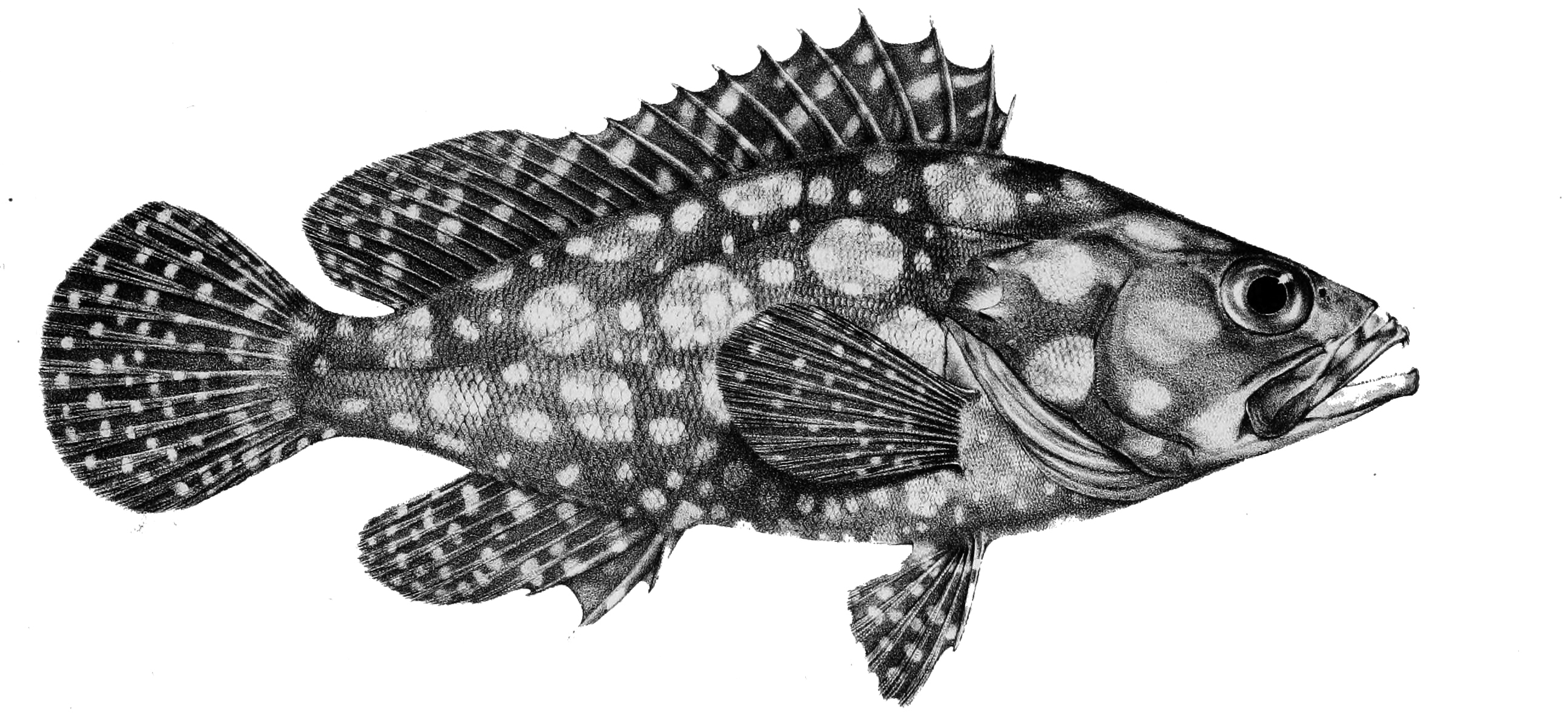
The white-streaked grouper Epinephelus ongus is the type-host of P. quadratus

The type-host and only recorded host of P. quadratus is the white-streaked grouper Epinephelus ongus. The type-locality and only recorded locality is the barrier reef off Nouméa, New Caledonia.
