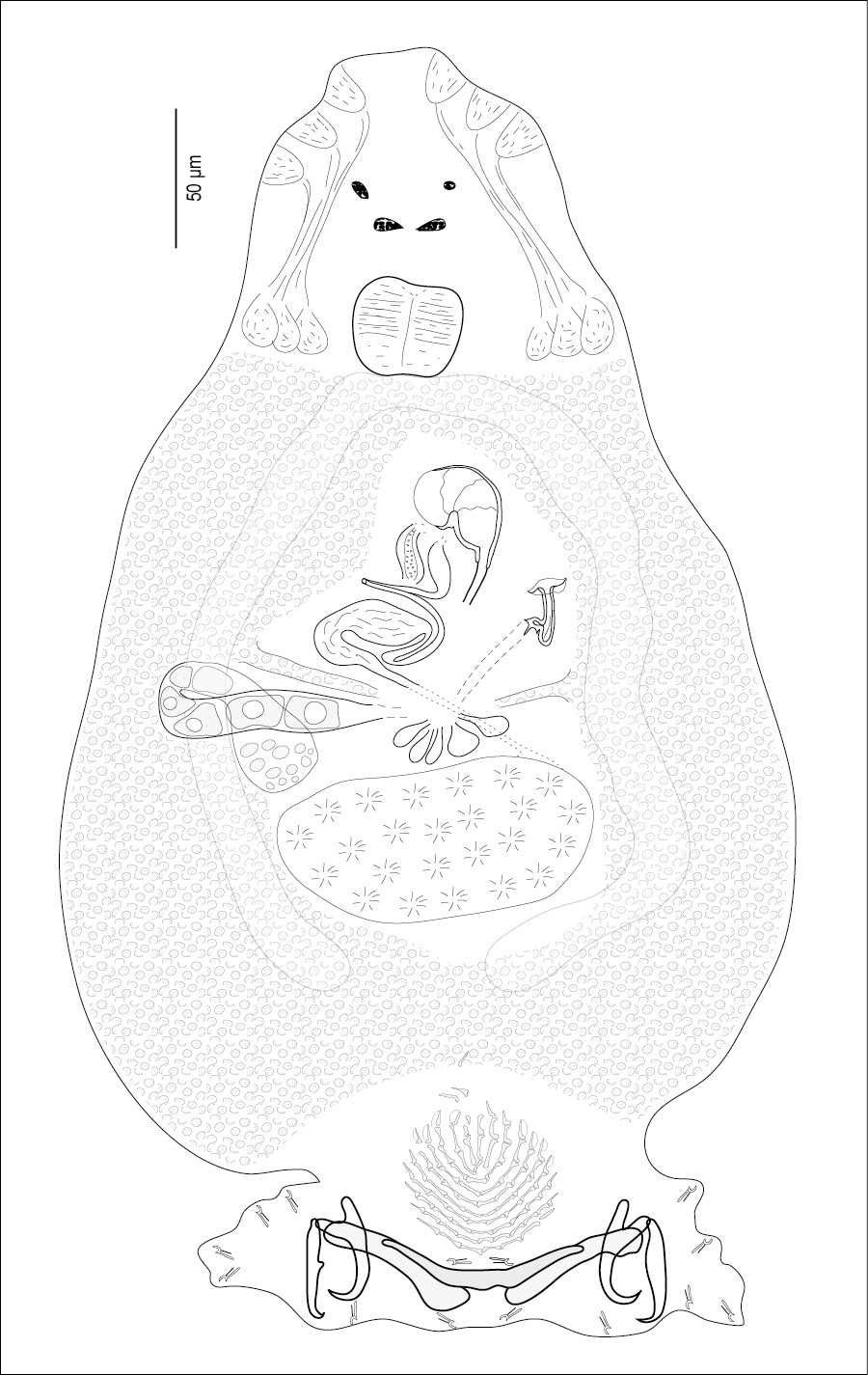

Scientific classification
- Kingdom: Animalia
- Phylum: Platyhelminthes
- Class: Monogenea
- Order: Dactylogyridea
- Family: Diplectanidae
- Genus: Pseudorhabdosynochus
- Species: P. caledonicus

Binomial name
- Pseudorhabdosynochus caledonicus Justine, 2005

= Pseudorhabdosynochus caledonicus =

Species of flatworm

Pseudorhabdosynochus caledonicus is a diplectanid monogenean parasitic on the gills of the Blacktip grouper, Epinephelus fasciatus. It has been described in 2005.

== Description ==
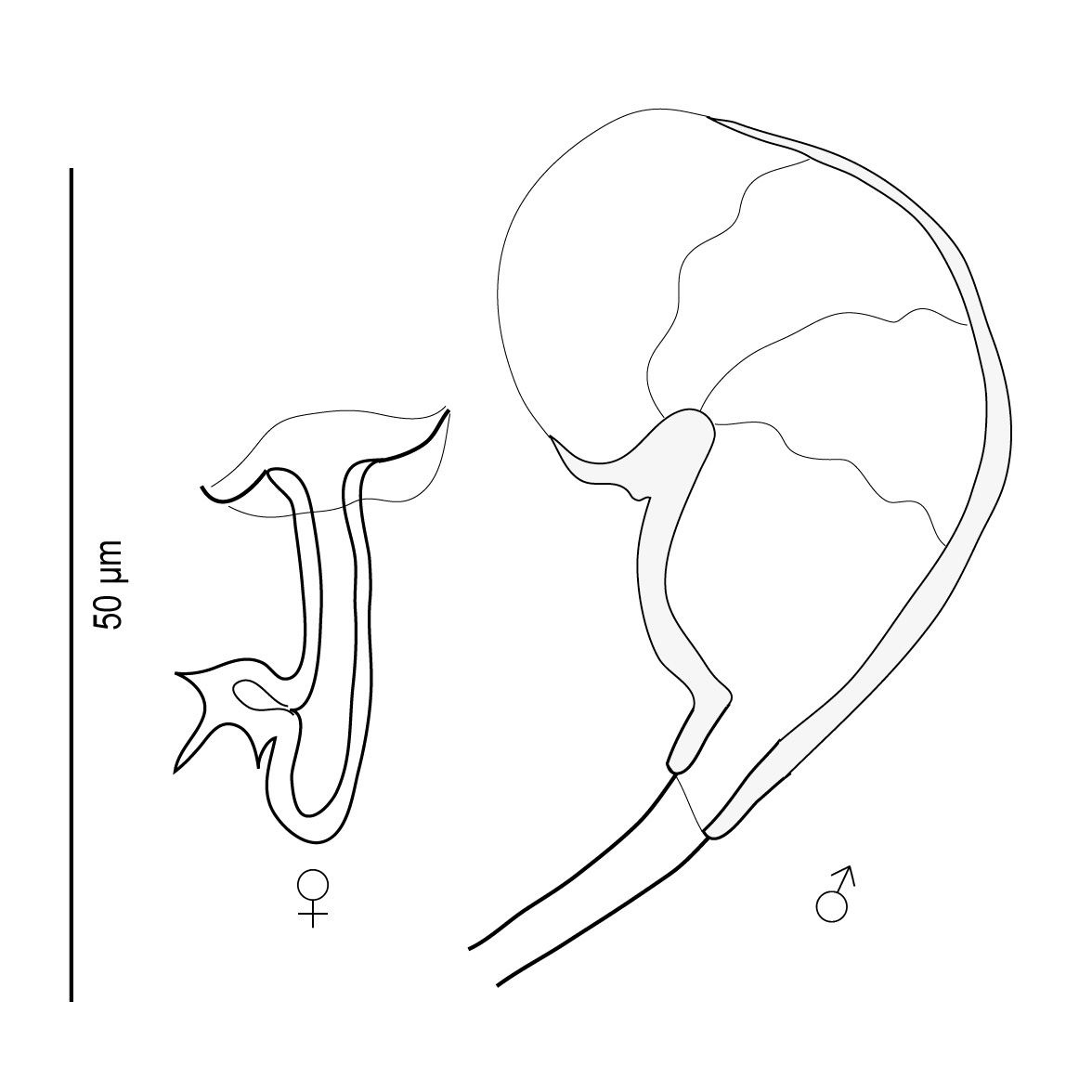
Female (left) and male (right) sclerotised organs

Pseudorhabdosynochus caledonicus is a small monogenean, 0.5 mm in length. The species has the general characteristics of other species of Pseudorhabdosynochus, with a flat body and a posterior haptor, which is the organ by which the monogenean attaches itself to the gill of is host. The haptor bears two squamodiscs, one ventral and one dorsal.

The sclerotized male copulatory organ, or "quadriloculate organ", has the shape of a bean with four internal chambers, as in other species of Pseudorhabdosynochus.

The vagina includes a sclerotized part, which is a complex structure. It has been described as "a heavily sclerotised ‘trumpet’, followed by sclerotised test-tube shaped cylinder, with heavily sclerotised structure associated laterally with cylinder and a lateral structure, roughly star-shaped, with small chamber communicating with lumen of cylinder".

== Etymology ==
Pseudorhabdosynochus caledonicus was named for the type-locality, New Caledonia, in the South Pacific.

== Hosts and localities ==
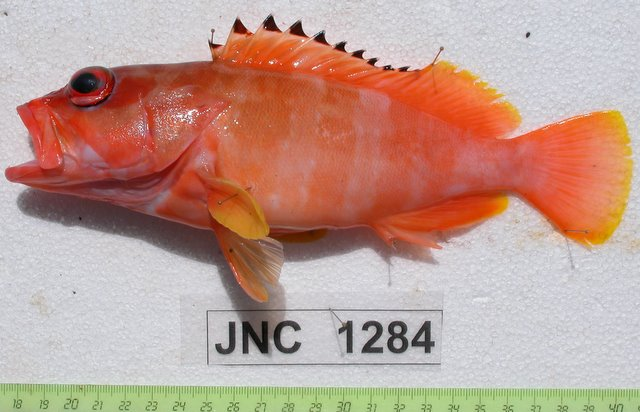
The Blacktip grouper, Epinephelus fasciatus is the type-host of Pseudorhabdosynochus caledonicus

The type-host and only recorded host of P. caledonicus is the Blacktip grouper, Epinephelus fasciatus (Serranidae: Epinephelinae). The type-locality and only recorded locality is off Nouméa, New Caledonia. Only about 20% of the host fish were infested.
