= Pseudorhabdosynochus summanae =

Scientific classification
- Kingdom: Animalia
- Phylum: Platyhelminthes
- Class: Monogenea
- Order: Dactylogyridea
- Family: Diplectanidae
- Genus: Pseudorhabdosynochus
- Species: P. summanae

Binomial name
- Pseudorhabdosynochus summanae (Young, 1969)

Species of worm

Pseudorhabdosynochus summanae is a species of diplectanid monogenean parasitic on the gills of the grouper Epinephelus summana. It was described in 1969, from only four specimens, under the name Diplectanum summanae and transferred to the genus Pseudorhabdosynochus in 1986.

== Description ==
Pseudorhabdosynochus summanae is a small monogenean, 0.3-0.5 mm in length. The species has the general characteristics of other species of Pseudorhabdosynochus, with a flat body and a posterior haptor, which is the organ by which the monogenean attaches itself to the gill of is host. The haptor bears two squamodiscs, one ventral and one dorsal. The sclerotized male copulatory organ, or "quadriloculate organ", has the shape of a bean with four internal chambers, as in other species of Pseudorhabdosynochus. The vagina includes a sclerotized part, which is a complex structure.

== Etymology ==
The specific epithet of the species, summanae, is not clearly explained in the original publication, but obviously refers to the name of the host fish, Epinephelus summana.

== Hosts and localities ==
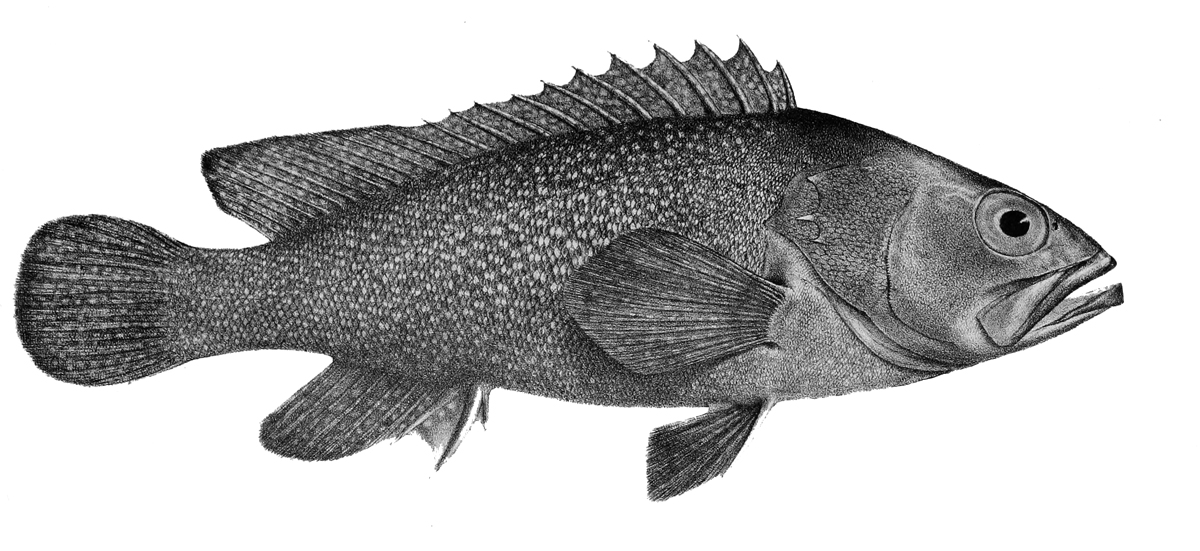
The grouper Epinephelus summana is the host of Pseudorhabdosynochus summanae

The type-locality is off Heron Island (Queensland), Australia and the type-host is Epinephelus summana.
