= Rhabdosynochus =

Scientific classification
- Kingdom: Animalia
- Phylum: Platyhelminthes
- Class: Monogenea
- Order: Dactylogyridea
- Family: Diplectanidae
- Genus: Rhabdosynochus; Mizelle & Blatz, 1941

Species
- See text

Genus of worms

Rhabdosynochus is a genus of monopisthocotylean monogeneans, belonging to the family Diplectanidae.

The type-species of the genus, Rhabdosynochus rhabdosynochus Mizelle & Blatz, 1941, was initially described as a member of the sub-family Tetraonchinae. The genus was then transferred to the Diplectaninae by Hargis, then to the Ancyrocephalinae by Bychowsky (1957), and finally to the Diplectanidae by Yamaguti (1963). Oliver (1987) confirmed its position within the family Diplectanidae.

== Species ==
According to the World Register of Marine Species, species include:

- Rhabdosynochus alterinstitus Mendoza-Franco, Violante-Gonzalez & Vidal-Martinez, 2008
- Rhabdosynochus hargisi Kritsky, Boeger & Robaldo, 2001
- Rhabdosynochus hudsoni Kritsky, Boeger & Robaldo, 2001
- Rhabdosynochus lituparvus Mendoza-Franco, Violante-González & Vidal-Martínez, 2008
- Rhabdosynochus nigrescensi (Mendoza-Franco, Violante-González & Vidal-Martínez, 2006) Domingues & Boeger, 2008
- Rhabdosynochus rhabdosynochus Mizelle & Blatz, 1941 (Type species)
- Rhabdosynochus siliquaus Mendoza-Franco, Violante-González & Vidal-Martínez, 2008
- Rhabdosynochus viridisi Montero‑Rodríguez, Mendoza‑Franco & López Téllez, 2020
- Rhabdosynochus volucris Mendoza-Franco, Violante-González & Vidal-Martínez, 2008

== Transcriptome ==
The transcriptome of Rhabdosynochus viridisi has been studied in 2022, and G-Protein-Coupled-Receptors (GPCRs) were described in detail in this species, together with those of another monogenean, Scutogyrus longicornis. These were the first two transcriptomes released for monogeneans of the subclass Monopisthocotylea.
