= Cephalopholis panamensis =

Conservation status
- Least Concern (IUCN 3.1)

Scientific classification
- Kingdom: Animalia
- Phylum: Chordata
- Class: Actinopterygii
- Division: Teleostei
- Order: Perciformes
- Family: Epinephelidae
- Genus: Cephalopholis
- Species: C. panamensis

Binomial name
- Cephalopholis panamensis (Steindachner, 1877)

Synonyms
- List: Serranus panamensis Steindachner, 1876; Epinephelus panamensis (Steindachner, 1876); Petrometopon panamensis (Steindachner, 1876)

Species of fish

Cephalopholis panamensis, the Pacific graysby or Panama graysby, is a species of marine ray-finned fish, a grouper of the family Epinephelidae. It is found in the tropical Eastern Pacific Ocean.

== Taxonomy ==
Cephalopholis panamensis was first formally described as Serranus panamensis in 1876 by the Austrian ichthyologist Franz Steindachner (1834-1919) with the type locality given as Panama.

== Distribution ==
Cephalopholis panamensis is found in the eastern Pacific where it is distributed from the Gulf of California, Mexico to northern Peru. Its range includes Islas Marías and the Revillagigedos in Mexico, the Galápagos in Ecuador, Malpelo Island in Colombia and the Cocos Island in Costa Rica.

== Description ==
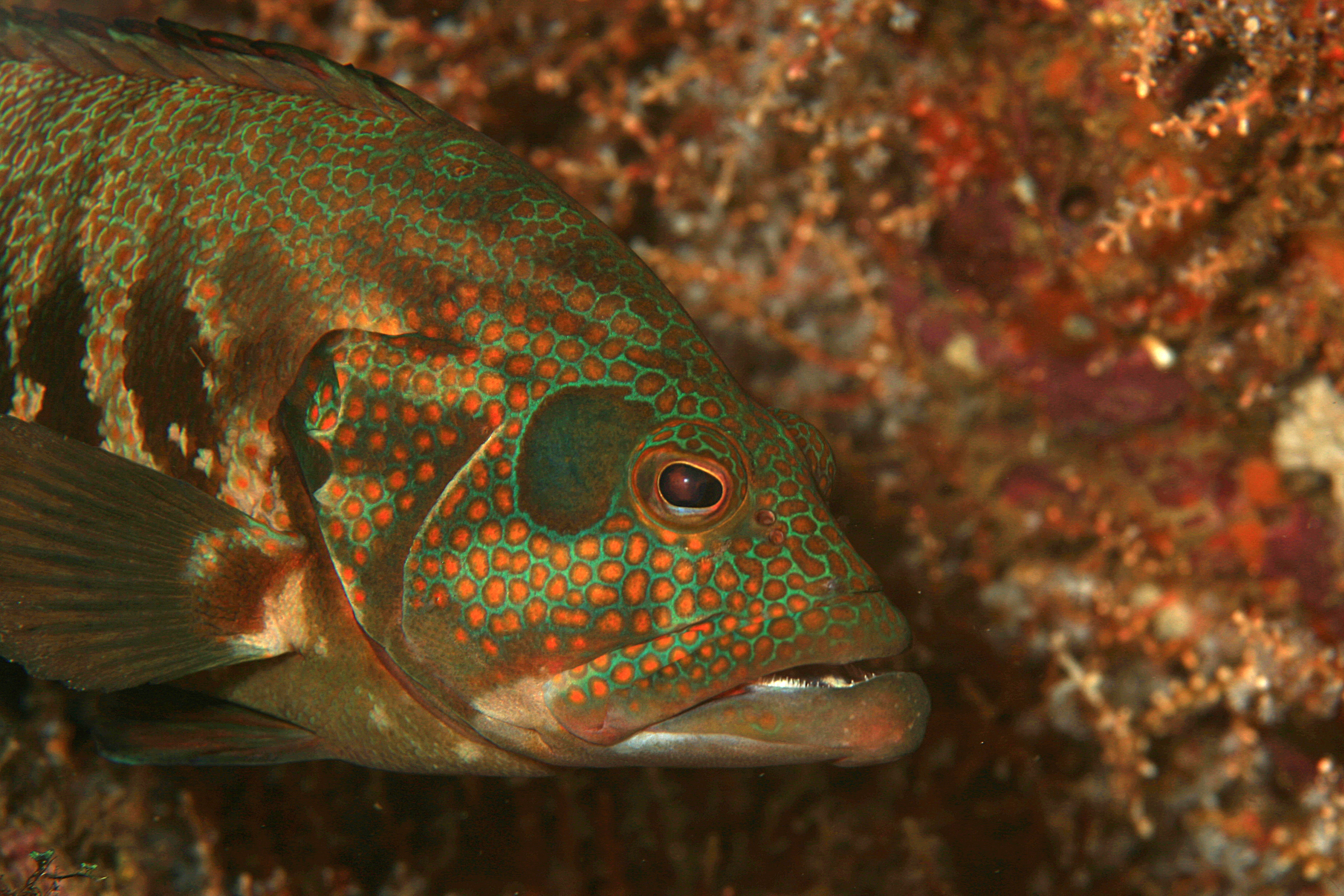
Closeup, in Panama

Cephalopholis panamensis grows up to a total length of 39 centimetres (15 in), but it is more commonly around 20 centimetres (7.9 in). It has a robust body which is oblong-shaped with a long snout and a convex profile in the intraorbital region. Most of its teeth are movable. It has a rounded, finely serrated preopercle and there are 48-49 scales in the lateral line. The dorsal fin contains 9 spines, with the third spine being the longest, and 14-15 soft rays while the anal fin has 3 spines and 8 soft rays. The membrane of the dorsal fin is notched between the front spines.

In the Gulf of California

The adults have a pale grey-brown body with around 9 dark vertical bars along the flanks. The head is dark with diagonal pale bands, a patterning of blue and orange spots and a large dark blotch just to the rear of the eye. The dorsal fin spines are dark while the membrane is pale while the soft rayed part of that fin is dark with a pale line along its base. The caudal fin and anal fin are dark. Juveniles have a medium blue grey body, a pale blue-grey lower head which is marked with orange spots and lines with the upper part of the head and the spiny part of the dorsal fin being green. They also have a blue grey soft rayed portion of the dorsal fin and a blue grey caudal fin with a black margin.

== Habitat and biology ==
Juvenile, in Panama

In Colima, Mexico

Cephalopholis panamensis is found in rocky shore habitats, preferring shallower, warmer water than many other species in the genus Cephalopholis. They can also be found in coral reefs. They are one of the most common grouper species within their range. It feeds on fishes and crustaceans.

=== Reproduction ===
They are protogynous hermaphrodites, the males are larger and older than the females with the sex ratio biased towards there being more females. They form harems made up of a single male and several females. They form pairs to court in the evening. Spawning takes place around the full moon and they spawn between May and September, peaking in July to August in the central Gulf of California. The females attain sexual maturity at around 17 centimetres (6.7 in) when they are a year and a half old, the change to male takes place when they are 20 centimetres (7.9 in) and at least three years old. They can live for up to 16 years.

== Utilisation ==
Cephalopholis panamensis was of little interest to fisheries in the past but, in the Gulf of Mexico, its importance as a commercial species has increased as the populations of larger groupers has decreased through overfishing.
