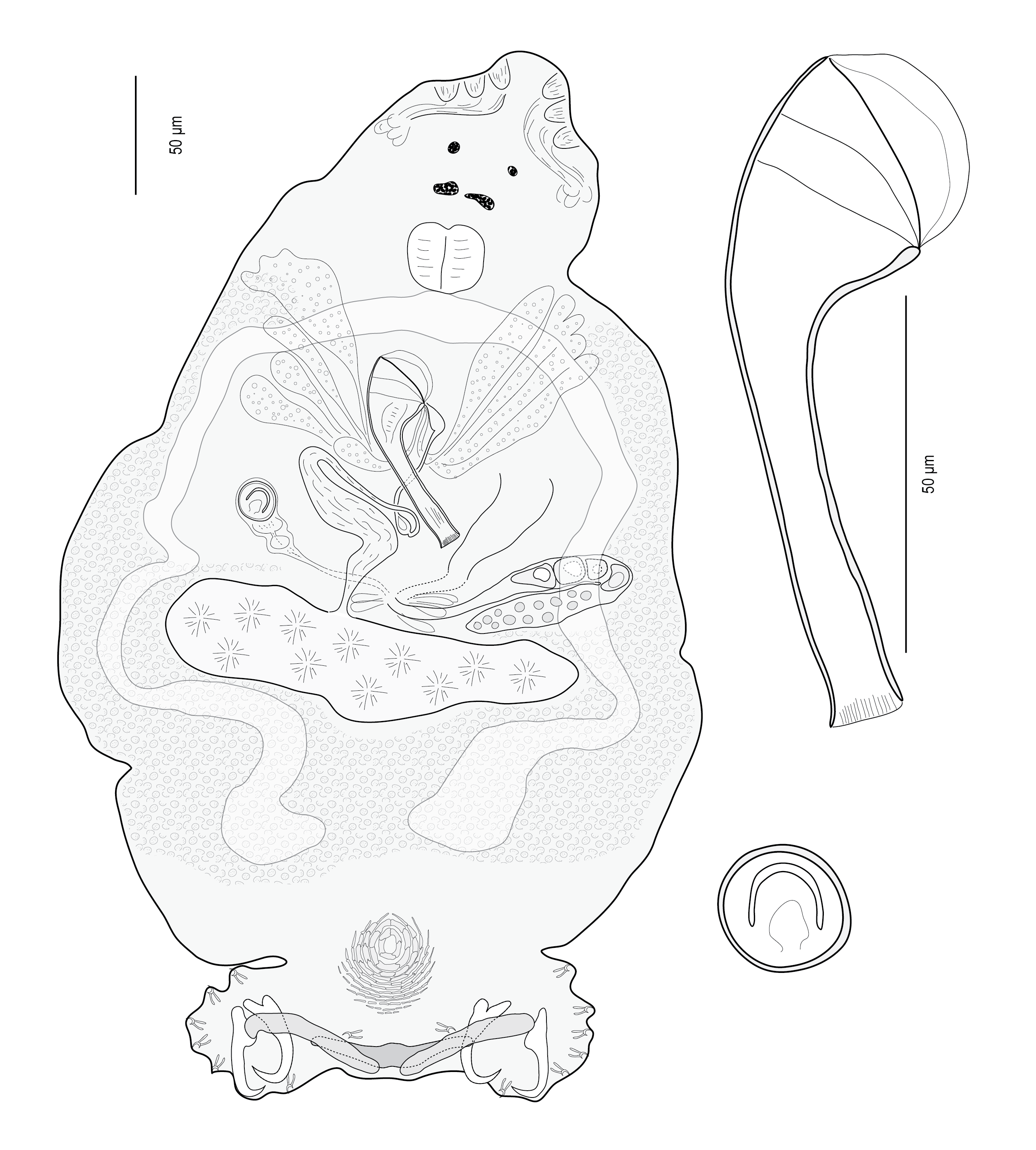
- Laticola dae, body (left) and sclerotised parts of the genital organs (right)

Scientific classification
- Kingdom: Animalia
- Phylum: Platyhelminthes
- Class: Monogenea
- Order: Dactylogyridea
- Family: Diplectanidae
- Genus: Laticola
- Species: L. dae

Binomial name
- Laticola dae Journo & Justine, 2006

= Laticola dae =

Species of flatworm

Laticola dae is a species of diplectanid monogenean. It is parasitic on the gills of the Highfin grouper, Epinephelus maculatus. It was described in 2006. The species is a member of the genus Laticola Yang, Kritsky, Sun, Zhang, Shi & Agrawal, 2006. More than 400 specimens of this parasite were studied for the description of the species, which was the most abundant monogenean species, representing about 50% of the specimens found on this fish.

== Etymology ==
The authors of the taxon stated that "in an initial examination of the several species of diplectanids found on Epinephelus maculatus, this species was designated as ‘‘d.a.e’’. for French ‘‘Diplectanidae à anneau et entonnoir’’ (Diplectanids with ring and funnel); the acronym was latinised as dae and used as an indeclinable noun in apposition."

== Hosts and localities ==
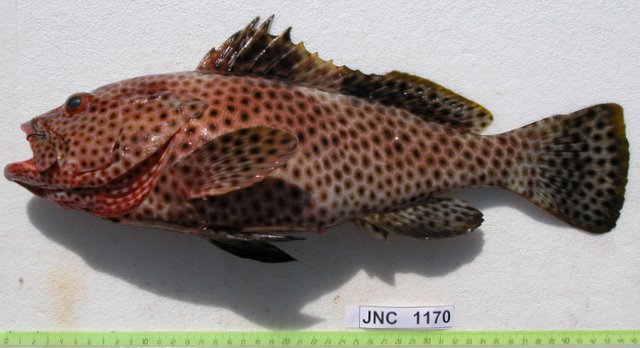
The highfin grouper, Epinephelus maculatus is the type-host of Laticola dae

The type-host and only recorded host of Laticola dae is the highfin grouper, Epinephelus maculatus (Serranidae: Epinephelinae). The type-locality and only recorded locality is the Barrier Reef off Nouméa, New Caledonia.

This fish host, in the same locality, also harbours a series of species of the diplectanid genus Pseudorhabdosynochus, including P. auitoe, P. buitoe, P. cuitoe, P. duitoe, P. euitoe, P. fuitoe, P. guitoe, and P. huitoe, and two species of ancyrocephalid of the genus Haliotrema.
