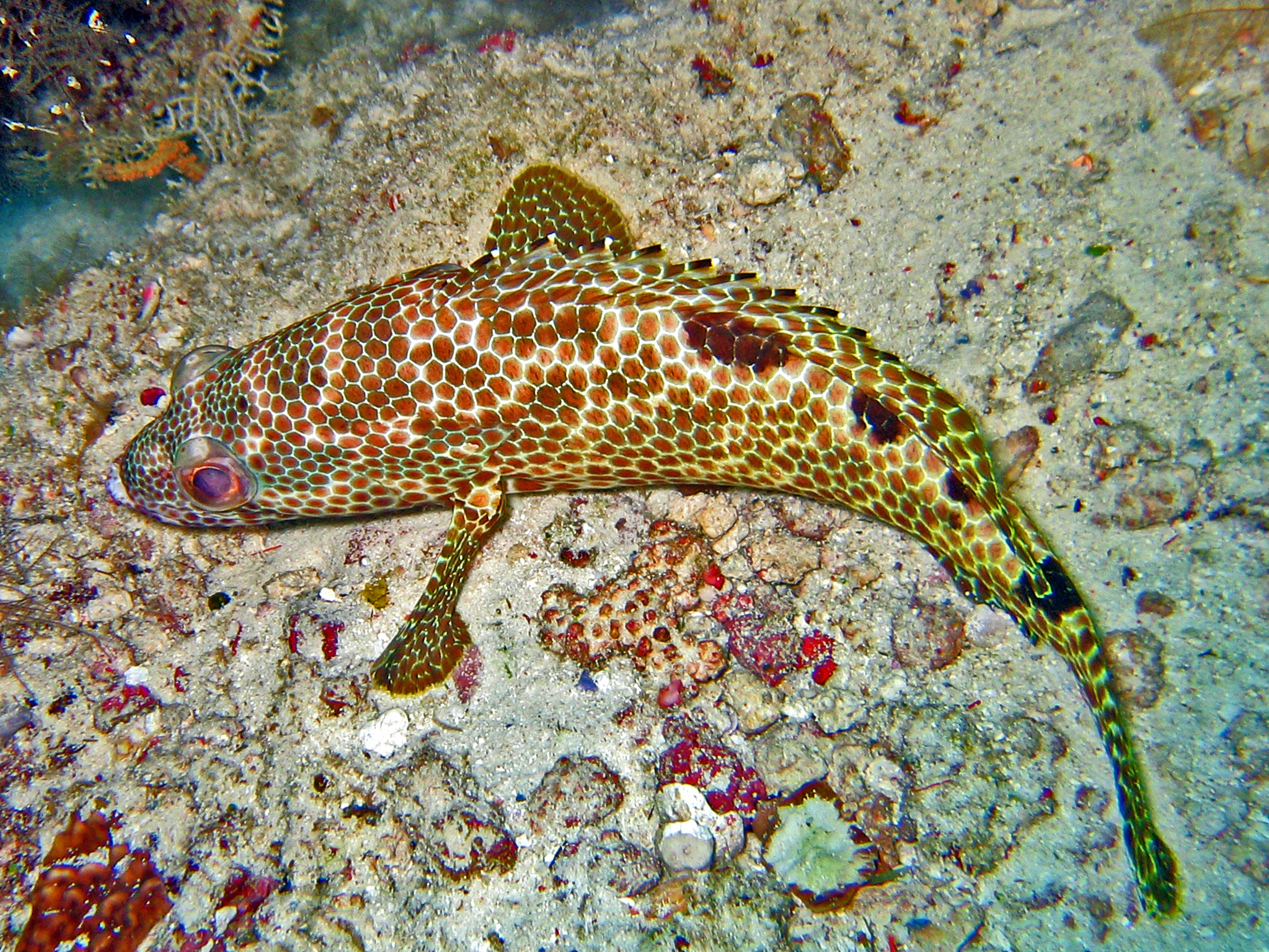
- Epinephelus spilotoceps in Maldives

Conservation status
- Least Concern (IUCN 3.1)

Scientific classification
- Kingdom: Animalia
- Phylum: Chordata
- Class: Actinopterygii
- Order: Perciformes
- Family: Epinephelidae
- Genus: Epinephelus
- Species: E. spilotoceps

Binomial name
- Epinephelus spilotoceps Schultz, 1953

Synonyms
- Epinephelus salonotus J. L. B. Smith & M.M. Smith, 1963

= Epinephelus spilotoceps =

Species of fish

Epinephelus spilotoceps, the foursaddle grouper or spotty cod, is a species of marine ray-finned fish, a grouper from the subfamily Epinephelinae which is part of the family Serranidae, which also includes the anthias and sea basses. It is found in the Indo-Pacific region.

== Description ==
Epinephelus spilotoceps has a standard length which is 3.1 to 3.6 times its depth. It has a flat region between the eyes and the dorsal profile of the head is convex. The preopercle is rounded and has a shallow incision, with the serrations on the margin below the incision enlarged. The gill cover has a straight upper margin. The dorsal fin contains 11 spines and 14-16 soft rays and the anal fin has 3 spines and 8 soft rays. The caudal fin is rounded. The colour of the head and body is pale and they are largely covered in many dark olive-brown to reddish-brown polygonal spots which are set close together with pale spaces between them and forming a reticulated pattern. There are four dark saddle-like blotches, three along the base of the dorsal fin and one on the caudal peduncle. The outer part of the pectoral fins are yellowish-green. This species attains a maximum total length of 35 centimetres (14 in).

== Distribution ==
Epinephelus spilotoceps is widespread in Indo-West-Pacific. It is found along the eastern coast of Africa from Kenya and Zanzibar to Ponta Zavora in Mozambique and on the Indian Ocean Islands of Mauritius, Comoros, Seychelles, Chagos, Maldives, Laccadives, Andaman Islands and Nicobar Islands. It then extends eastwards into the Malayan Archipelago as far east as Micronesia, the Line Islands and Cook Islands. It extends south to the Great Barrier Reef and the north western coast of Australia. It is absent from the South China Sea and the Java Sea. With the exception of its coastal distribution off Eastern Africa, this species shows a preference for islands.

== Habitat and biology ==
Epinephelus spilotoceps occurs in shallow coral reefs, mainly in patch reefs within lagoons, the upper slopes of channels through reefs and the outer reef margins. It has been recorded on rubble patches in the Maldives, mostly close to the edges and in the vicinity of the more complex coral formations and avoiding being out in the open. In captivity they feed on crustaceans and fish.

== Taxonomy ==
Epinephelus spilotoceps was first formally described in 1953 by the American ichthyologist Leonard Peter Schultz (1901–1986) with the type locality given as the lagoon reef off Namu Island, Bikini Atoll in the Marshall Islands. This species is one of a group of related members of the genus Epinephelus known as "reticulated coral groupers" along with E. bilobatus, E. faveatus, E. hexagonatus, E. macrospilos, E. maculatus, E. melanostigma, E. merra and E. quoyanus. These species have frequently been mistaken for each other and as a result many specimens in museums have been misidentified.

== Utilisation ==
Epinephelus spilotoceps is a small species of grouper that has low value in commercial fish trade nevertheless it is taken by small-scale artisanal and subsistence fisheries in much of its range. In Pohnpei they are caught using spears and in the Maldives, it is exported for sale in the live reef fish food trade. It does appear in the aquarium trade.
