= Pseudorhabdosynochus melanesiensis =

Scientific classification
- Kingdom: Animalia
- Phylum: Platyhelminthes
- Class: Monogenea
- Order: Dactylogyridea
- Family: Diplectanidae
- Genus: Pseudorhabdosynochus
- Species: P. melanesiensis

Binomial name
- Pseudorhabdosynochus melanesiensis (Laird, 1958) Kritsky & Beverley-Burton, 1986

Species of flatworm

Pseudorhabdosynochus melanesiensis is a diplectanid monogenean parasitic on the gills of the grouper, Epinephelus merra. It was described in 1958 as Diplectanum melanesiensis then transferred to the genus Pseudorhabdosynochus by Kritsky & Beverley-Burton in 1986.

== Description ==
Pseudorhabdosynochus melanesiensis is a small monogenean, 0.2-0.5 mm in length. The species has the general characteristics of other species of Pseudorhabdosynochus, with a flat body and a posterior haptor, which is the organ by which the monogenean attaches itself to the gill of is host. The haptor bears two squamodiscs, one ventral and one dorsal. The sclerotized male copulatory organ, or "quadriloculate organ", has the shape of a bean with four internal chambers, as in other species of Pseudorhabdosynochus.

The vagina includes a sclerotized part, which is a complex structure. Pseudorhabdosynochus melanesiensis is a member of the "Pseudorhabdosynochus cupatus group", which includes species with similar structures of the vagina, such as Pseudorhabdosynochus cupatus, Pseudorhabdosynochus cyathus, Pseudorhabdosynochus calathus and Pseudorhabdosynochus youngi.

== Etymology ==
According to Laird, the name of the species, melanesiensis, refers to "the presence of the parasite in two of the island groups of Melanesia".

== Hosts and localities ==
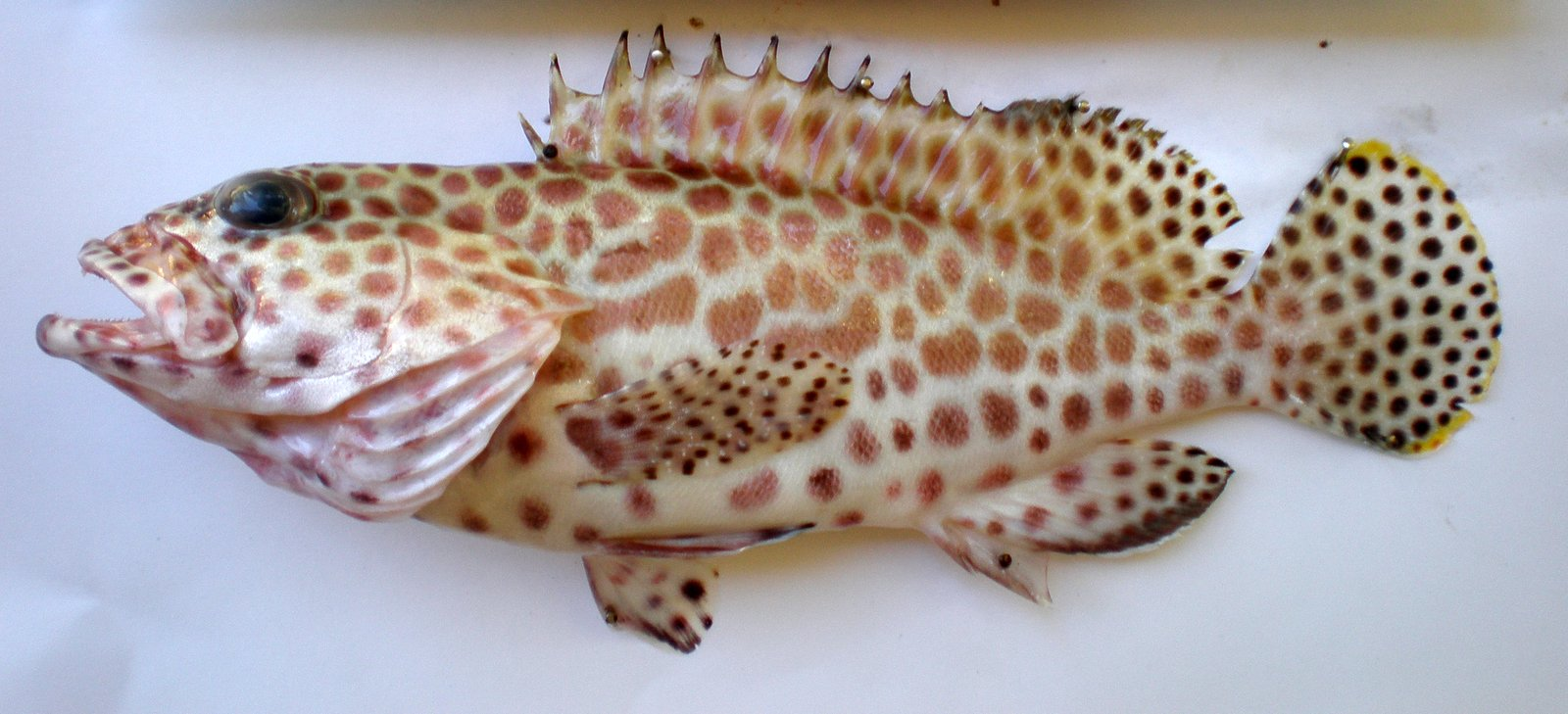
The honeycomb grouper, Epinephelus merra, is the type-host of Pseudorhabdosynochus melanesiensis

The type-locality is off Anatom, New Hebrides (now Vanuatu) and the species was also described from specimens collected off Fiji. The type-host is the honeycomb grouper, Epinephelus merra. The species has also been recorded from New Caledonia in the same host fish.
