= Pseudorhabdosynochus exoticus =

Scientific classification
- Kingdom: Animalia
- Phylum: Platyhelminthes
- Class: Monogenea
- Order: Dactylogyridea
- Family: Diplectanidae
- Genus: Pseudorhabdosynochus
- Species: P. exoticus

Binomial name
- Pseudorhabdosynochus exoticus Sigura & Justine, 2008

Species of flatworm

Pseudorhabdosynochus exoticus is a species of diplectanid monogenean that is parasitic on the gills of the blue grouper Epinephelus cyanopodus. It was described in 2008.

== Description ==
Pseudorhabdosynochus exoticus is a small monogenean, 400–800 μm in length. The species has the general characteristics of other species of Pseudorhabdosynochus, with a flat body and a posterior haptor, which is the organ by which the monogenean attaches itself to the gill of is host. The haptor bears two squamodiscs, one ventral and one dorsal.

The sclerotized male copulatory organ, or "quadriloculate organ", has the shape of a bean with four internal chambers, as in other species of Pseudorhabdosynochus.

The vagina includes a sclerotized part, which is a complex structure. It comprises a discoid structure, 13–18 μm in diameter, with central dome and an internal (dorsal) structure of variable shape. The only species with a similar structure is Pseudorhabdosynochus exoticoides Justine & Henry, 2010.

== Etymology ==
According to the authors of the taxon, the species name is from Greek exotikos, ‘from the outside, alien, foreign’ to mark the strange structure of the vagina of this species.

== Hosts and localities ==
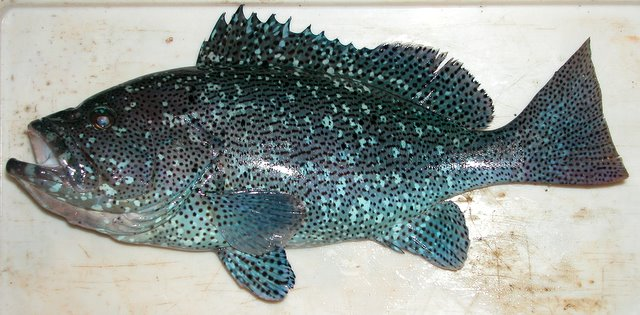
The blue grouper, Epinephelus cyanopodus, is the host of P. exoticus

The type-host and only recorded host of P. exoticus is the blue grouper Epinephelus cyanopodus (Serranidae: Epinephelinae). The type-locality and only recorded locality is off Nouméa, New Caledonia. This grouper also harbours several other species of Pseudorhabdosynochus, namely P. chauveti, P. cyanopodus, P. podocyanus, P. duitoe, and P. huitoe, and a diplectanid belonging to a different genus, Laticola cyanus. On the specimens of fish from off New Caledonia examined, P. exoticus represented 15% of the total number of monogeneans on the gills; 226 specimens were examined.
