= Pseudorhabdosynochus chauveti =

Scientific classification
- Kingdom: Animalia
- Phylum: Platyhelminthes
- Class: Monogenea
- Order: Dactylogyridea
- Family: Diplectanidae
- Genus: Pseudorhabdosynochus
- Species: P. chauveti

Binomial name
- Pseudorhabdosynochus chauveti Sigura & Justine, 2008

Species of flatworm

Pseudorhabdosynochus chauveti is a species of diplectanid monogenean that is parasitic on the gills of the blue grouper Epinephelus cyanopodus. It was described in 2008.

== Description ==
Pseudorhabdosynochus chauveti is a small monogenean, 300–600 μm in length. The species has the general characteristics of other species of Pseudorhabdosynochus, with a flat body and a posterior haptor, which is the organ by which the monogenean attaches itself to the gill of is host. The haptor bears two squamodiscs, one ventral and one dorsal. The sclerotized male copulatory organ, or "quadriloculate organ", has the shape of a bean with four internal chambers, as in other species of Pseudorhabdosynochus.

The vagina includes a sclerotized part, which is a complex structure.

== Etymology ==
The name of the species chauveti honours Professor Chauvet "who provided fish host for the study".

== Hosts and localities ==
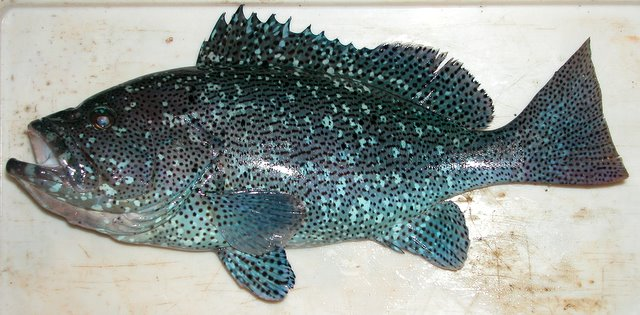
The blue grouper Epinephelus cyanopodus, is the host of Pseudorhabdosynochus chauveti

The type-host and only recorded host of P. chauveti is the blue grouper Epinephelus cyanopodus (Serranidae: Epinephelinae). The type-locality and only recorded locality is off Nouméa, New Caledonia. This grouper also harbours several other species of Pseudorhabdosynochus, namely P. cyanopodus, P. podocyanus, P. exoticus, P. duitoe, and P. huitoe, and a diplectanid belonging to a different genus, Laticola cyanus. On the specimens of fish from off New Caledonia examined, P. chauveti was relatively rare, representing only 3.8% of the total number of monogeneans on the gills.
