= Laticola cyanus =

Scientific classification
- Kingdom: Animalia
- Phylum: Platyhelminthes
- Class: Monogenea
- Order: Dactylogyridea
- Family: Diplectanidae
- Genus: Laticola
- Species: L. cyanus

Binomial name
- Laticola cyanus Sigura & Justine, 2008

Species of flatworm

Laticola cyanus is a species of diplectanid monogenean that is parasitic on the gills of the blue grouper Epinephelus cyanopodus. It was described in 2008.

== Etymology ==
The species epithet, cyanus, blue in Latin, was based on the host name, Epinephelus cyanopodus.

== Hosts and localities ==
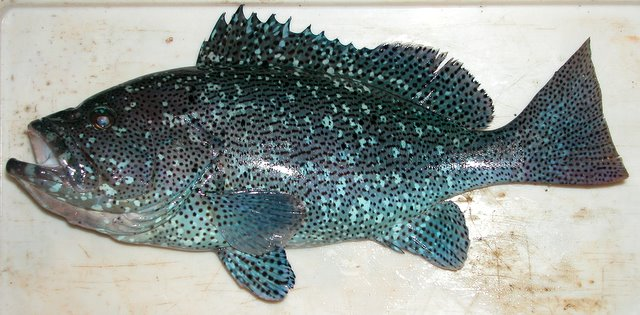
The blue grouper Epinephelus cyanopodus, is the host of Laticola cyanus

The type-host and only recorded host of L. cyanus is the blue grouper Epinephelus cyanopodus (Serranidae: Epinephelinae). The type-locality and only recorded locality is off Nouméa, New Caledonia. This grouper also harbours several species of the diplectanid genus Pseudorhabdosynochus, namely P. cyanopodus, P. chauveti, P. podocyanus, P. exoticus, P. duitoe, and P. huitoe, but Laticola cyanus is the only species belonging to the genus Laticola.
