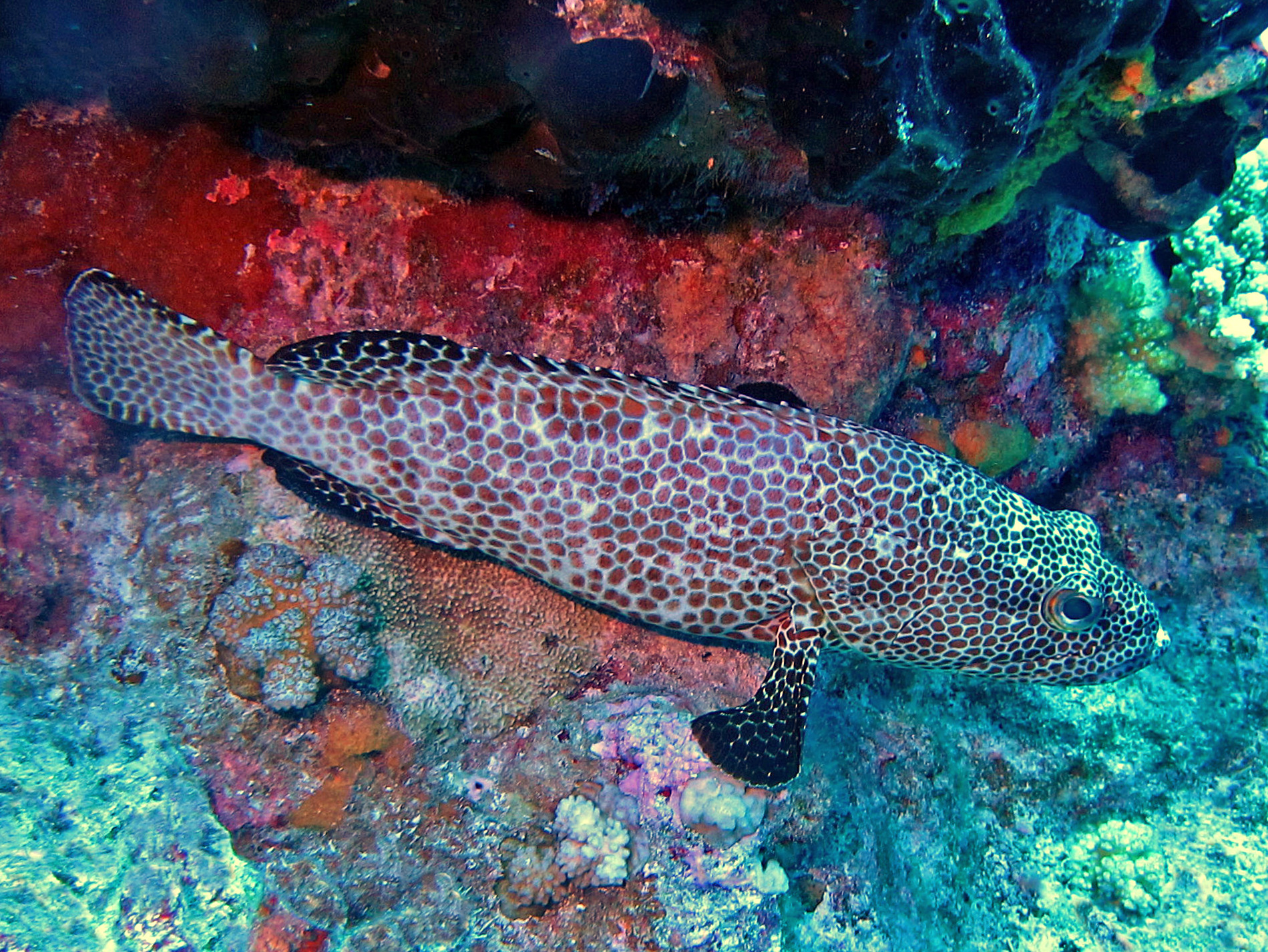
- Epinephelus merra from French Polynesia

Conservation status
- Least Concern (IUCN 3.1)

Scientific classification
- Kingdom: Animalia
- Phylum: Chordata
- Class: Actinopterygii
- Division: Teleostei
- Order: Perciformes
- Family: Epinephelidae
- Genus: Epinephelus
- Species: E. merra

Binomial name
- Epinephelus merra Bloch, 1793

Synonyms
- Cephalopholis merra (Bloch, 1793); Serranus merra (Bloch, 1793)

= Honeycomb grouper =

Species of fish

The honeycomb grouper (Epinephelus merra), also known as black-spotted rock-cod, common birdwire rockcod, dwarf spotted rockcod, dwarf-spotted grouper, honeycomb cod, wire-netted reefcod or wire-netting cod, is a species of marine ray-finned fish, a grouper from the subfamily Epinephelinae which is part of the family Serranidae, which also includes the anthias and sea basses. It has a wide Indo-Pacific distribution where it is found in coastal and offshore reefs in shallow waters.

== Distribution ==
The Honeycomb grouper is one of the most common small groupers of the Indo-Pacific. It is widespread throughout the tropical waters of the Indo-Pacific from South Africa to Pitcairn, north to southern Japan, south to Lord Howe Island. A single specimen was reported from French Mediterranean waters in 2005. It is not present in the Red Sea, the Persian Gulf, coastal India and Hawaii.

== Description ==
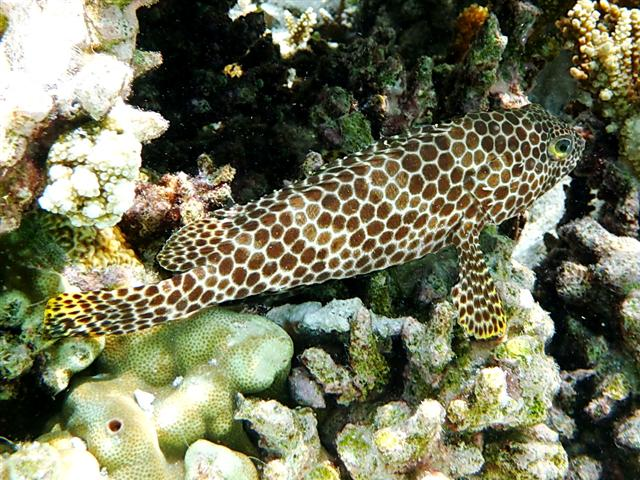
Epinephelus merra from Maldives

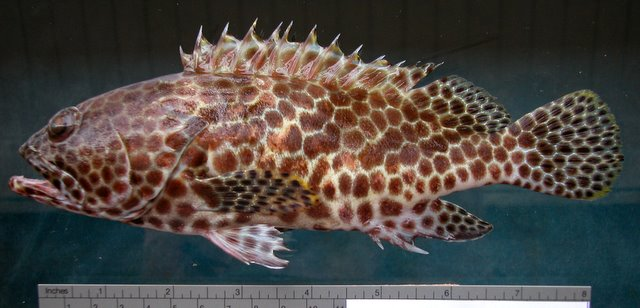
Epinephelus merra

Epinephelus merra reaches a maximum known length of 32 centimetres (13 in) and it is one of the smaller fish species in the genus Epinephelus. This species has a long dorsal fin with eleven spines, 15-17 dorsal soft rays and 8 anal soft rays. The body is ochre to light brown, stocky, with an oval profile. It is covered by small brown hexagons with pale interspaces disposed on irregular darker diagonal bands and forming a network (hence the common name of the species). These hexagonal spots are also present on all fins. The caudal fin is rounded and the interorbital area is flat, with a convex dorsal head profile. The eyes are globular, with red-brown to black pupils. The lower jaw is longer than the upper one and on the midlateral part of the lower jaw there are 2-4 rows of teeth.

== Biology ==
These solitary groupers live in seaward reefs and in shallow lagoon, usually at depths less than 20 m., but they can reach about 50 m. Juveniles prefer reefs with staghorn corals (Acropora species). They mainly feed on fishes, crabs, shrimps and cephalopods, with and increase of piscivory with age. After the sexual maturity they are initially females and later they turn into males. Usually the groupers with a length of 16 cm are still females. These fishes usually spawn from January to April and the spawning begin 2 to 3 days before full moon and last about 3–4 days.

== Hermaphroditism ==
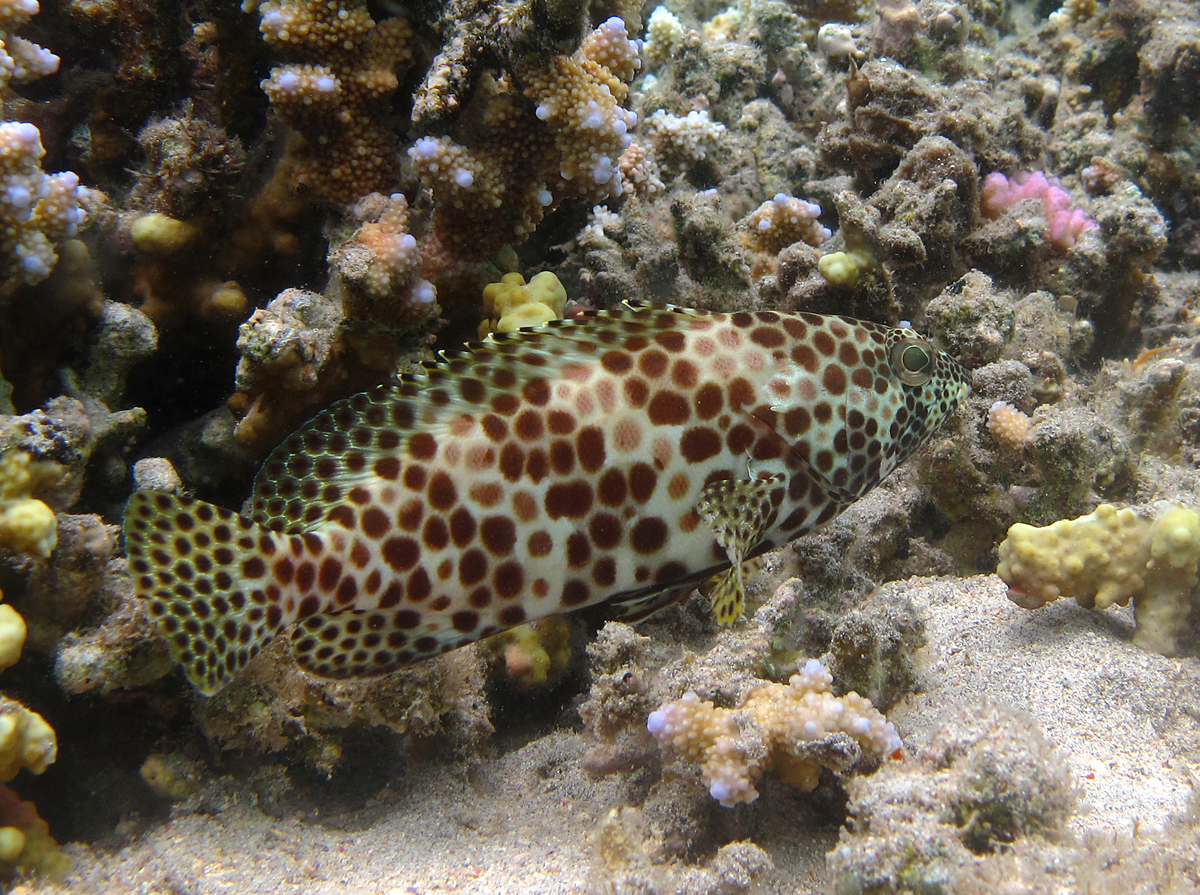
Epinephelus merra from Reunion Island

The genus Epinephelus has the ability to change sexes, more specifically they are protogynous hermaphrodites what means females can turn into males at one point in their life. This sex change usually happens in the non breeding season and can be caused by social stimuli, age, growth, and body size. Yet, the initial trigger for the sex change remains unknown.

Females turn into males when they reach a length of approximately 20 cm, thus the size advantage model for sequential hermaphroditism applies in the case of the honeycomb grouper. The size advantage model states that if an individual can reproduce more effectively as one sex when small or young and as the other sex when larger or older, it should change sex at some point in its life history.

== Taxonomy ==
The honeycomb grouper was first formally described in 1793 by the German naturalist Marcus Elieser Bloch (1723–1799) with the type locality given as "Japan Sea" which is thought to probably mean the Indian Ocean. This species is one of a group of related members of the genus Epinephelus known as "reticulated coral groupers" along with E. bilobatus, E. faveatus, E. hexagonatus, E. macrospilos, E. maculatus, E. melanostigma, E. quoyanus and E. spilotoceps. These species have frequently been mistaken for each other and as a result many specimens in museums have been misidentified.
