= Pseudorhabdosynochus youngi =

Scientific classification
- Kingdom: Animalia
- Phylum: Platyhelminthes
- Class: Monogenea
- Order: Dactylogyridea
- Family: Diplectanidae
- Genus: Pseudorhabdosynochus
- Species: P. youngi

Binomial name
- Pseudorhabdosynochus youngi Justine, Dupoux & Cribb, 2009

Species of worm

Pseudorhabdosynochus youngi is species of diplectanid monogenean parasitic on the gills of the blacktip grouper, Epinephelus fasciatus. It was described in 2009.

== Description ==
Pseudorhabdosynochus youngi is a small monogenean, 0.3 mm in length. The species has the general characteristics of other species of Pseudorhabdosynochus, with a flat body and a posterior haptor, which is the organ by which the monogenean attaches itself to the gill of is host. The haptor bears two squamodiscs, one ventral and one dorsal. The sclerotized male copulatory organ, or "quadriloculate organ", has the shape of a bean with four internal chambers, as in other species of Pseudorhabdosynochus. The vagina includes a sclerotized part, which is a complex structure.

This species is a member of the Pseudorhabdosynochus cupatus group, which includes several species having a similar structure of the sclerotised vagina; these are Pseudorhabdosynochus cupatus, Pseudorhabdosynochus cyathus, Pseudorhabdosynochus calathus and Pseudorhabdosynochus youngi.

== Etymology ==
The name of the species is after Australian ichthyologist and parasitologist P. C. Young, "in recognition to his work on monogeneans, and especially this species".

== Hosts and localities ==
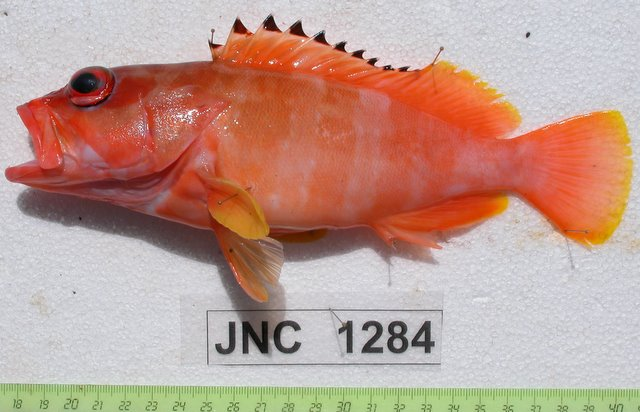
The blacktip grouper is the type-host of Pseudorhabdosynochus youngi

The type-locality is the Barrier Reef off Nouméa, New Caledonia. The type-host is the Blacktip Grouper, Epinephelus fasciatus.
