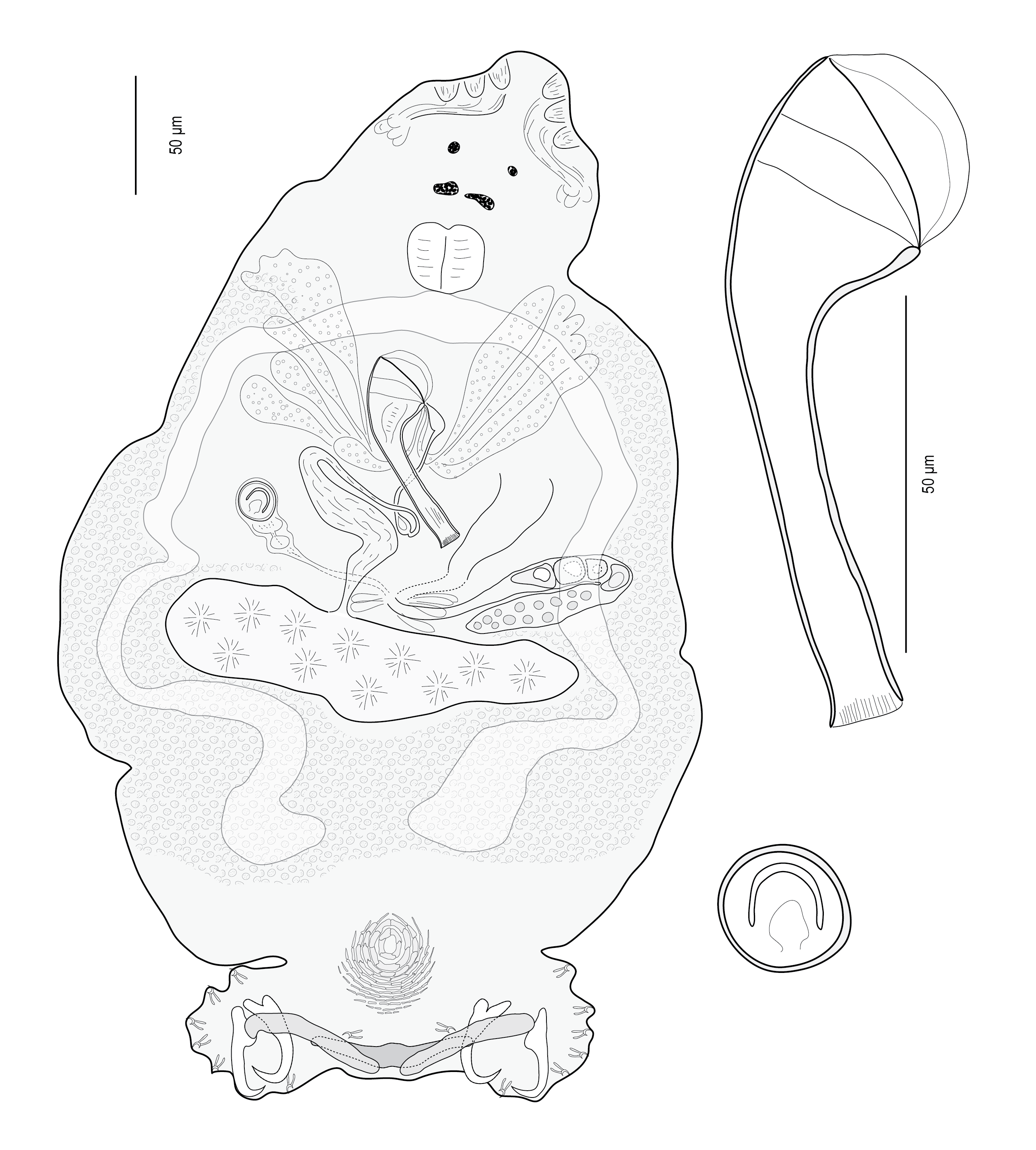
- Laticola dae, body (left) and sclerotised parts of the genital organs (right)

Scientific classification
- Kingdom: Animalia
- Phylum: Platyhelminthes
- Class: Monogenea
- Order: Dactylogyridea
- Family: Diplectanidae
- Genus: Laticola; Yang, Kritsky, Sun, Zhang, Shi & Agrawal, 2006

Species
- See text

= Laticola =

Genus of flatworms

Laticola is a genus of monopisthocotylean monogeneans, belonging to the family Diplectanidae. All known species are parasitic on the gills of marine fish, including members of Lates (Latidae) and Epinephelus (Serranidae).

The genus was proposed for species with a spoon-shaped male copulatory organ with two to four concentric incomplete ridges in the base.

== Etymology ==
The generic name is derived from the genus of the type-host, Lates.

== Species ==
According to the World Register of Marine Species, the valid species included in the genus are:

- Laticola cyanus Sigura & Justine, 2008
- Laticola dae Journo & Justine, 2006
- Laticola latesi (Tripathi, 1959) Yang, Kritsky, Sun, Zhang, Shi & Agrawal, 2006
- Laticola paralatesi (Nagibina, 1976) Yang, Kritsky, Sun, Zhang, Shi & Agrawal, 2006
- Laticola seabassi (Wu, Li, Zhu & Xie, 2005) Domingues & Boeger, 2008
