= Pseudorhabdosynochus calathus =

Scientific classification
- Kingdom: Animalia
- Phylum: Platyhelminthes
- Class: Monogenea
- Order: Dactylogyridea
- Family: Diplectanidae
- Genus: Pseudorhabdosynochus
- Species: P. calathus

Binomial name
- Pseudorhabdosynochus calathus Hinsinger & Justine, 2006

Species of flatworm

Pseudorhabdosynochus calathus is a diplectanid monogenean parasitic on the gills of the grouper Epinephelus rivulatus. It has been described in 2006.

== Description ==
Pseudorhabdosynochus calathus is a small monogenean, 0.5 mm-1.1 mm in length. The species has the general characteristics of other species of Pseudorhabdosynochus, with a flat body and a posterior haptor, which is the organ by which the monogenean attaches itself to the gill of is host. The haptor bears two squamodiscs, one ventral and one dorsal. The sclerotized male copulatory organ, or "quadriloculate organ", has the shape of a bean with four internal chambers, as in other species of Pseudorhabdosynochus.

The vagina includes a sclerotized part, which is a complex structure, resembling to what is found in P. cupatus.

== Etymology ==
Calathus is Latin for cup, bowl. Pseudorhabdosynochus calathus was named with reference to P. cupatus (cupatus means "in form of cup"), and refers to the cup-shape of the squamodiscs in live specimens. A similar etymology was used for P. cyathus Hinsinger & Justine, 2006.

== Hosts and localities ==
The type-host and only recorded host of P. calathus is the grouper Epinephelus rivulatus (Serranidae: Epinephelinae). The type-locality and only recorded locality is off Nouméa, New Caledonia.
