= Pseudorhabdosynochus cupatus =

Scientific classification
- Kingdom: Animalia
- Phylum: Platyhelminthes
- Class: Monogenea
- Order: Dactylogyridea
- Family: Diplectanidae
- Genus: Pseudorhabdosynochus
- Species: P. cupatus

Binomial name
- Pseudorhabdosynochus cupatus (Young, 1969)

Synonyms
- Diplectanum cupatum Young, 1969; Cycloplectanum cupatum (Young, 1969); Pseudorhabdosynochus cupatum (Young, 1969)

Species of flatworm

Pseudorhabdosynochus cupatus is a species of diplectanid monogenean parasitic on the gills of groupers.

== Description ==
Pseudorhabdosynochus cupatus is a small monogenean. The species has the general characteristics of other species of Pseudorhabdosynochus, with a flat body and a posterior haptor, which is the organ by which the monogenean attaches itself to the gill of is host. The haptor bears two squamodiscs, one ventral and one dorsal. The sclerotized male copulatory organ, or "quadriloculate organ", has the shape of a bean with four internal chambers, as in other species of Pseudorhabdosynochus. The vagina includes a sclerotized part, which is a complex structure.

The species has been redescribed in detail by Justine in 2005, from various specimens from several localities, including New Caledonia. On the basis of similar structures of the sclerotised vagina, Hinsinger & Justine (2006) considered that several species of Pseudorhabdosynochus, including Pseudorhabdosynochus cyathus and Pseudorhabdosynochus calathus, should be included in a "Pseudorhabdosynochus cupatus group".

== Hosts and localities ==
Young in 1969 stated that the type-host was Epinephelus merra, but a comparison of the parasites of groupers in New Caledonia and Australia later showed that the actual type-host is Epinephelus quoyanus. The type-locality is off Heron Island, Queensland, Australia.

== Taxonomy ==
It was described in 1969 by Young as Diplectanum cupatum and transferred to the genus Pseudorhabdosynochus by Kritsky & Beverley-Burton in 1986. The species has several synonyms: Diplectanum cupatum Young, 1969; Cycloplectanum cupatum (Young, 1969) Beverley-Burton & Suriano, 1981; Pseudorhabdosynochus cupatum (Young, 1969) Kritsky & Beverley-Burton, 1986.
