= Pseudorhabdosynochus inversus =

Scientific classification
- Kingdom: Animalia
- Phylum: Platyhelminthes
- Class: Monogenea
- Order: Dactylogyridea
- Family: Diplectanidae
- Genus: Pseudorhabdosynochus
- Species: P. inversus

Binomial name
- Pseudorhabdosynochus inversus Justine, 2008

Species of flatworm

Pseudorhabdosynochus inversus is a diplectanid monogenean parasitic on the gills of the halfmoon grouper, Epinephelus rivulatus. It was described in 2008, from only three specimens.

== Description ==
Pseudorhabdosynochus inversus is a small monogenean, 0.3 mm in length. The species has the general characteristics of other species of Pseudorhabdosynochus, with a flat body and a posterior haptor, which is the organ by which the monogenean attaches itself to the gill of is host. The haptor bears two squamodiscs, one ventral and one dorsal. The sclerotized male copulatory organ, or "quadriloculate organ", has the shape of a bean with four internal chambers, as in other species of Pseudorhabdosynochus. The vagina includes a sclerotized part, which is a complex structure.

== Etymology ==
The name of the species, inversus, Latin for "turned upside down", was given in reference to the primary chamber of the vagina in comparison to the structure found in Pseudorhabdosynochus epinepheli.

== Hosts and localities ==
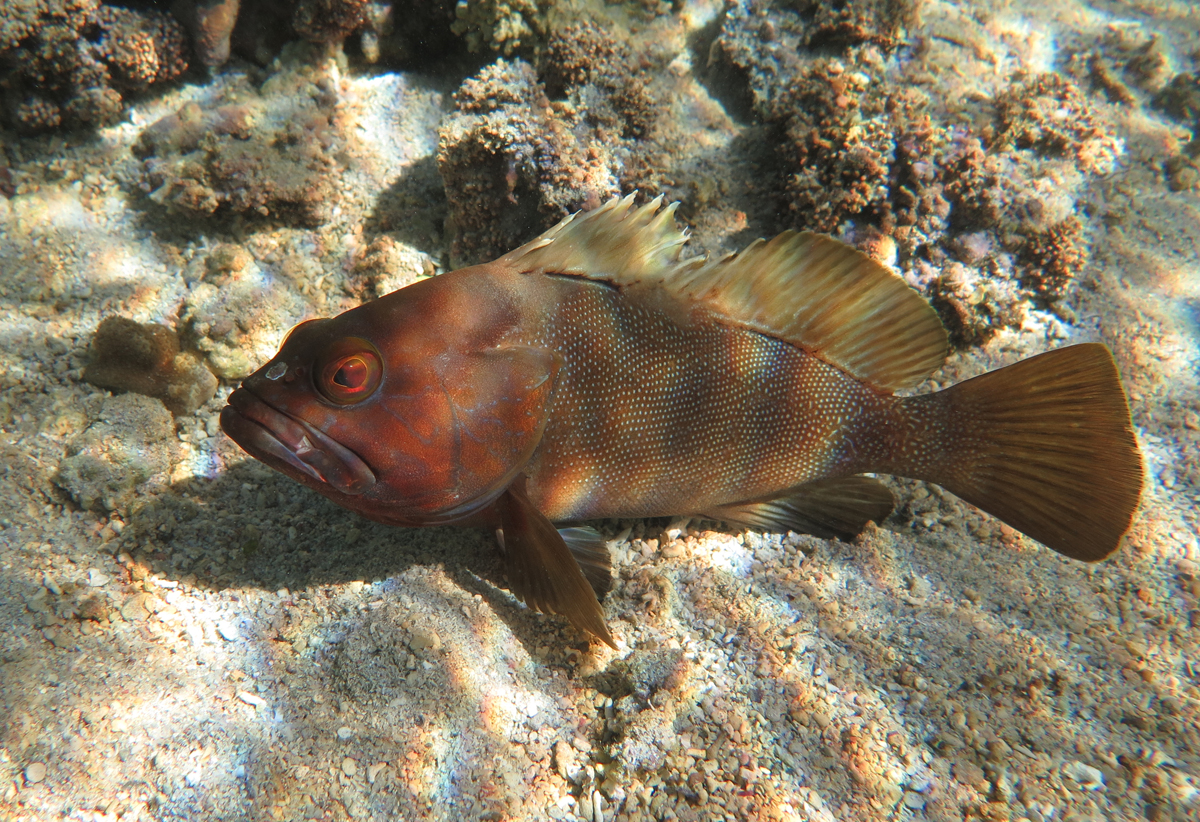
The halfmoon grouper, Epinephelus rivulatus, is the type-host of Pseudorhabdosynochus inversus

The type-locality is the Barrier Reef off Nouméa, New Caledonia. The type-host is the halfmoon grouper, Epinephelus rivulatus.
