= Pseudorhabdosynochus euitoe =

Scientific classification
- Kingdom: Animalia
- Phylum: Platyhelminthes
- Class: Monogenea
- Order: Dactylogyridea
- Family: Diplectanidae
- Genus: Pseudorhabdosynochus
- Species: P. euitoe

Binomial name
- Pseudorhabdosynochus euitoe Justine, 2007

Species of flatworm

Pseudorhabdosynochus euitoe is a diplectanid monogenean parasitic on the gills of the Highfin grouper, Epinephelus maculatus. It has been described in 2007.

== Description ==
Pseudorhabdosynochus euitoe is a small monogenean, 0.3-0.5 mm in length. The species has the general characteristics of other species of Pseudorhabdosynochus, with a flat body and a posterior haptor, which is the organ by which the monogenean attaches itself to the gill of is host. The haptor bears two squamodiscs, one ventral and one dorsal. The sclerotized male copulatory organ, or "quadriloculate organ", has the shape of a bean with four internal chambers, as in other species of Pseudorhabdosynochus. The vagina includes a sclerotized part, which is a complex structure.

== Etymology ==
Pseudorhabdosynochus euitoe is part of a series of eight species of Pseudorhabdosynochus with similar names. All these species are parasitic on the Highfin grouper, Epinephelus maculatus. According to the author, names of the new species have been formed on the base of "uitoe", the local name of the host, the Highfin grouper, and letters a–h, in accordance to International Code of Zoological Nomenclature articles 57.6 (one-letter difference) and 32.5.2.4.4 (no punctuation). The eight species sharing this etymology are P. auitoe, P. buitoe, P. cuitoe, P. duitoe, P. euitoe, P. fuitoe, P. guitoe, and P. huitoe.

== Hosts and localities ==
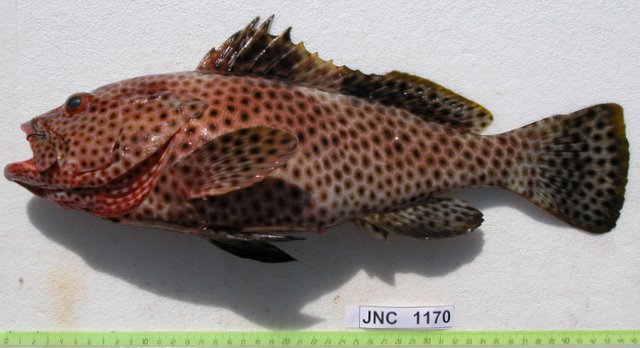
The Highfin grouper, Epinephelus maculatus is the type-host of Pseudorhabdosynochus euitoe

The type-host and only recorded host of P. euitoe is the Highfin grouper, Epinephelus maculatus (Serranidae: Epinephelinae). The type-locality and only recorded locality is the Barrier Reef off Nouméa, New Caledonia.
