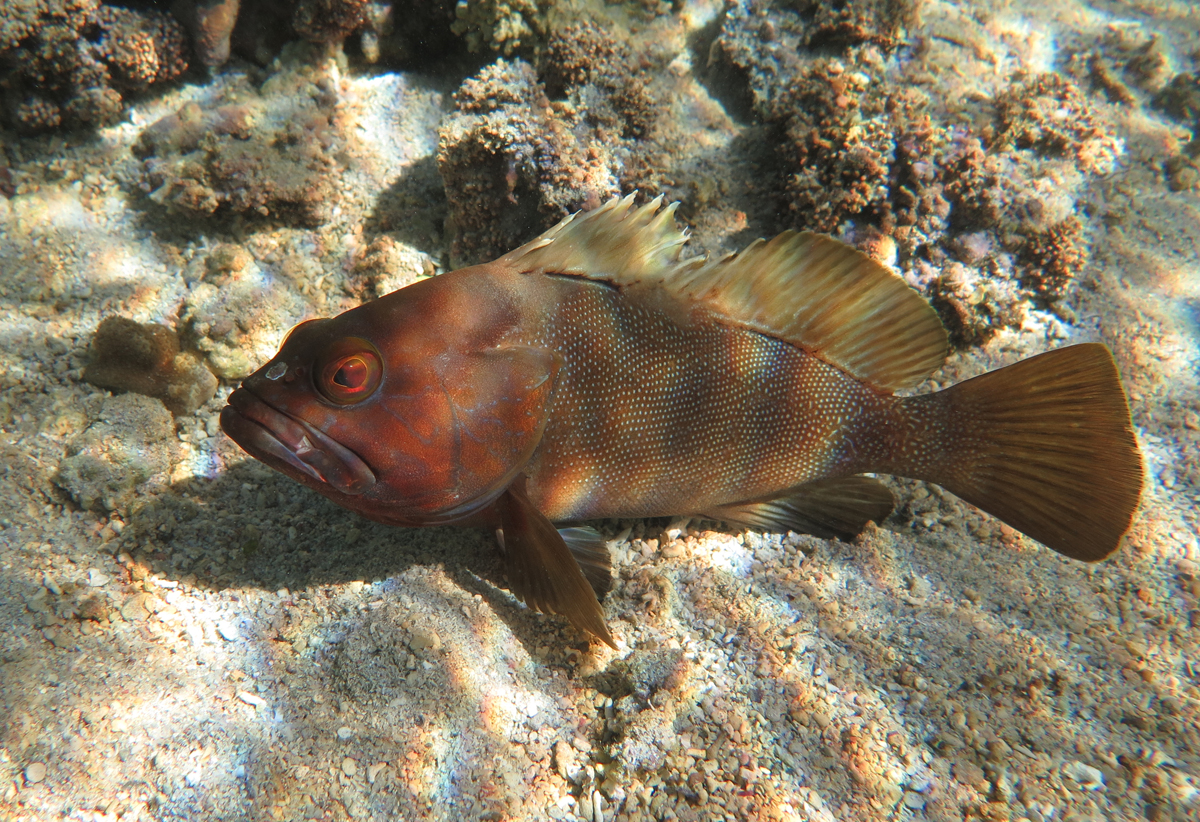

Conservation status
- Least Concern (IUCN 3.1)

Scientific classification
- Kingdom: Animalia
- Phylum: Chordata
- Class: Actinopterygii
- Order: Perciformes
- Suborder: Percoidei
- Family: Epinephelidae
- Genus: Epinephelus
- Species: E. rivulatus

Binomial name
- Epinephelus rivulatus (Valenciennes, 1830)

Synonyms
- Serranus rivulatus Valenciennes, 1830; Serranus rhyncholepis Bleeker, 1853; Epinephelus rhyncholepis (Bleeker, 1853); Serranus viridipinnis De Vis, 1884; Epinephelus grammatophorus Boulenger, 1903; Epinephelus raymondi Ogilby, 1908; Epinephelus matterni Fowler, 1918; Epinephelus homosinensis Whitley, 1944; Epinephelus spiramen Whitley, 1945

= Epinephelus rivulatus =

Halfmoon grouper

Species of fish

Epinephelus rivulatus, the halfmoon grouper, halfmoon rockcod, Chinaman rockcod, Charlie court cod, green-finned rock cod, or white-dotted grouper, is a species of marine ray-finned fish, a grouper from the subfamily Epinephelinae which is part of the family Serranidae, which also includes the anthias and sea basses. It is found in the Indo-Pacific region.

== Description ==
Epinephelus rivulatus has a body with a standard length which is 2.7 to 3.2 times its depth. The dorsal profile of the head is convex and the intraorbital region is flat. The preopercle is angular with 1 or 2 small spines on the anterior side of the angle while the gill cover is convex. The dorsal fin contains 11 spines and 16-18 soft rays while the anal fin as 3 spines and 8 soft rays. The membrane between the spines is notably notched. The caudal fin is rounded. The colour of the body is reddish to greenish-brown, with each scale on the body having a small white or pale blue spot. Sometimes 4 irregular dark vertical bars are visible, with a 5th bar on the caudal peduncle. The head is dark brown to pale reddish in colour with pale blue vermiculations and white spots on lower jaw and upper lip. The pectoral fin is dusky with a dark red or reddish-brown coloured blotch at its base. The remaining fins are greenish-brown or greyish-brown marked with dark mottling. Its maximum length is 45 cm (18 in), and weight reaches 1.4 kg (3.1 lb)

== Distribution ==
Epinephelus rivulatus has a wide Indo-West Pacific distribution. It is found from the east African coast from the Gulf of Aden south to South Africa and then east to New Caledonia, north to the Ogasawara Islands of southern Japan, south to Australia. Its range includes northern New Zealand, and it was first recorded from the Kermadec Islands Marine Reserve north of New Zealand in 2015, after researchers examined hundreds of hours of unused documentary film footage. It is d=found in the Indian Ocean islands of the Chagos, Comoros, Madagascar, Mauritius and the Seychelles, it does not occur in Fiji, the Red Sea or Persian Gulf.

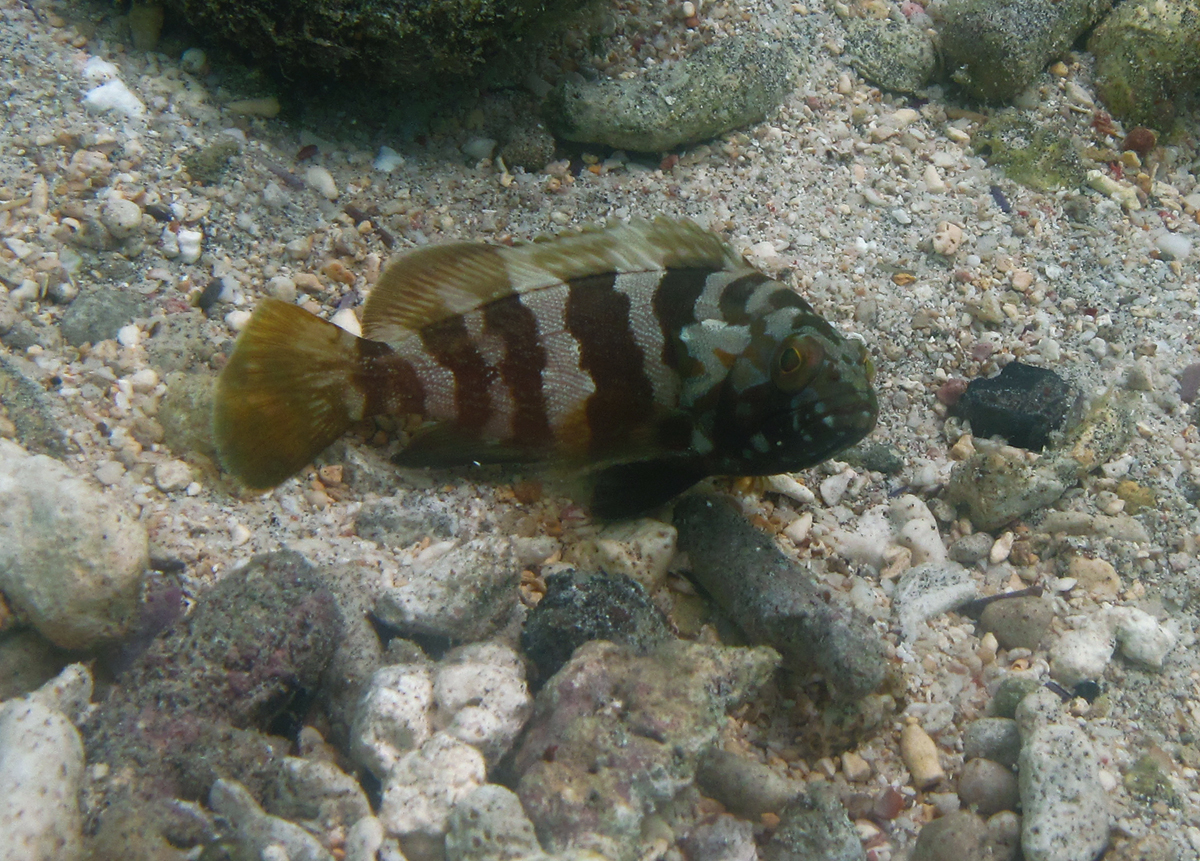
Juvenile

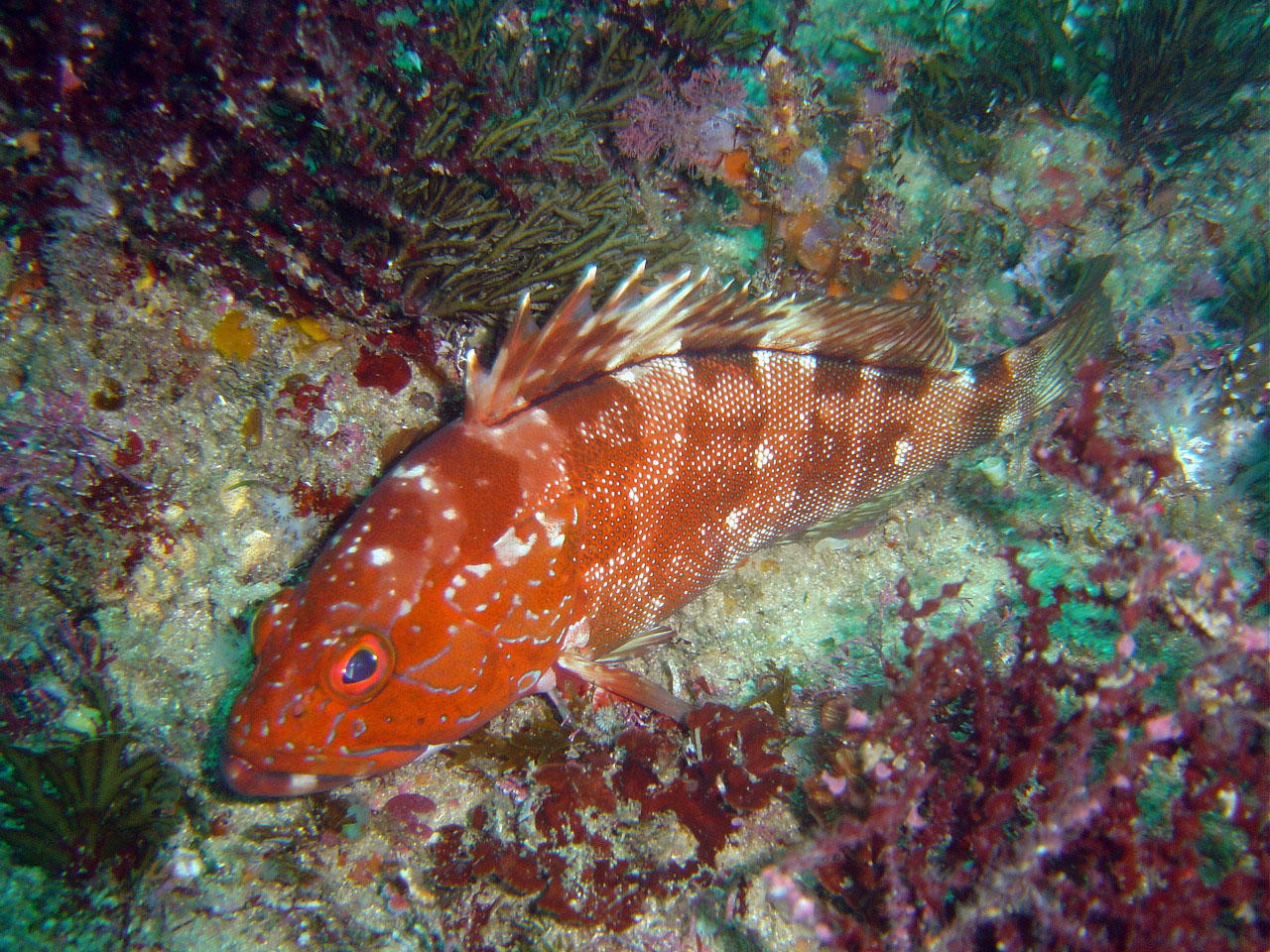
Near Durban, South Africa

== Habitat and biology ==
Epinephelus rivulatus occurs on coral reefs, over areas with rocky substrata, algal flats and seagrass beds. It feeds on fishes and crustaceans. It is found at depths of 1 to 150 metres (3.3 to 492.1 ft). It is a protogynous hermaphrodite. Sexually mature females were found between fork lengths of 144 to 350 millimetres (5.7 to 13.8 in) with half of them sexually mature at a fork length of 194 millimetres (7.6 in). The maless were larger than females and their fork lengths were 221 to 381 millimetres (8.7 to 15.0 in). These differ from site to site although the sex ratios were the same between sites, with roughly 5.5 females for every male. Off Western Australia the majority of the females were reproductively active between July and December coinciding relatively cool water temperatures and increasing daylight hours. Spawning occurred periodically with each female able to spawn at least twice in periods of two or three consecutive days. It is the only known host of the parasite Pseudorhabdosynochus inversus, which inhabits its gills. They form aggregations to spawn.

== Taxonomy ==
Epinephelus rivulatus was first formally described as Serranus rivulatus in 1830 by the French zoologist Achille Valenciennes (1794-1865) with the type locality given as Réunion. It is a member of the Epinephelus fasciatus species complex alongside E. fasciatus, E. irroratus, and E. retouti.

== Fisheries ==
Epinephelus rivulatus is of interest to both recreational and commercial fisheries despite its relative small size.
