= Epinephelus bilobatus =

Conservation status
- Least Concern (IUCN 3.1)

Scientific classification
- Kingdom: Animalia
- Phylum: Chordata
- Class: Actinopterygii
- Order: Perciformes
- Family: Epinephelidae
- Genus: Epinephelus
- Species: E. bilobatus

Binomial name
- Epinephelus bilobatus Randall & Allen, 1987

Species of fish

Epinephelus bilobatus, commonly known as the twin-spot groper or the frostback rockcod, a species of grouper from the subfamily Epinephelinae. E. bilobatus is known from around northwestern Australia and from West Papua (Indonesia). Found in coral reefs and rocky bottom in depths of 4 to 50 m. It is characterized by its greyish-brown color overall with hexagonal brown spots. The maximum total length is 33 cm (13 in).
