= Pseudorhabdosynochus cyathus =

Scientific classification
- Kingdom: Animalia
- Phylum: Platyhelminthes
- Class: Monogenea
- Order: Dactylogyridea
- Family: Diplectanidae
- Genus: Pseudorhabdosynochus
- Species: P. cyathus

Binomial name
- Pseudorhabdosynochus cyathus Hinsinger & Justine, 2006

Species of flatworm

Pseudorhabdosynochus cyathus is a diplectanid monogenean parasitic on the gills of the grouper Epinephelus howlandi. It has been described in 2006.

== Description ==
Pseudorhabdosynochus cyathus is a small monogenean, 0.4 mm-1.2 mm in length. The species has the general characteristics of other species of Pseudorhabdosynochus, with a flat body and a posterior haptor, which is the organ by which the monogenean attaches itself to the gill of is host. The haptor bears two squamodiscs, one ventral and one dorsal. The sclerotized male copulatory organ, or "quadriloculate organ", has the shape of a bean with four internal chambers, as in other species of Pseudorhabdosynochus.

The vagina includes a sclerotized part, which is a complex structure, resembling to what is found in P. cupatus.

== Etymology ==
Cyathus is Latin for cup, bowl. Pseudorhabdosynochus cyathus was named with reference to P. cupatus (cupatus means ‘‘in form of cup’’), and refers to the cup-shape of the squamodiscs in live specimens.

== Hosts and localities ==
The type-host and only recorded host of P. cyathus is the grouper Epinephelus howlandi (Serranidae: Epinephelinae). The type-locality and only recorded locality is off Nouméa, New Caledonia. It was found in New Caledonia that large host fish, Epinephelus howlandi, harboured only P. venus Hinsinger & Justine, 2006 and that small hosts (of fork length less than 300–350 mm) harboured only P. cyathus. Only one fish, of intermediate length, was found with both species of parasites.
