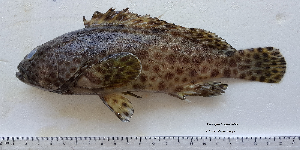

Conservation status
- Least Concern (IUCN 3.1)

Scientific classification
- Kingdom: Animalia
- Phylum: Chordata
- Class: Actinopterygii
- Order: Perciformes
- Family: Epinephelidae
- Genus: Epinephelus
- Species: E. faveatus

Binomial name
- Epinephelus faveatus (Valenciennes, 1828)

Synonyms
- Serranus faveatus Valenciennes, 1828; Serranus bontoo Valenciennes, 1828

= Epinephelus faveatus =

Species of fish

Epinephelus faveatus, the barrel-chested grouper, also known as the Indian grouper, is a species of marine ray-finned fish, a grouper from the subfamily Epinephelinae which is part of the family Serranidae, which also includes the anthias and sea basses. It is associated with reefs in the Indian Ocean.

== Description ==
Epinephelus faveatus has a body with a standard length which is three to three and a half times its depth. The dorsal profile of the head is cionvex, although the intraorbital area is slightly concave or flat. The preopercle is rounded and has a shallow indentation immediately above its corner where the serrations are slightly enlarged, The upper margin of the gill cover is slightly convex. The dorsal fin contains 11 spines and 16-18 soft rays while the anal fin has 3 spines and 8 soft rays. The caudal fin is rounded. The overall colour of this species is whitish to pale greyish covered by many closely set, round brown spots of differing sizes on the head, body and fins. This species attains a maximum total length of 32 centimetres (13 in).

== Distribution ==
Epinephelus faveatus is found in the Indian Ocean and has been recorded from southern India, Sri Lanka, the Andaman Islands, Nicobar Islands, the Cocos-Keeling Islands of Australia and in southern Indonesia off Bali and Lombok. This species is confused with other similar species of densely spotted brown groupers with rounded tails, and it is expected that it will be shown to have a continuous distribution from Pakistan to Indonesia with further observations.

== Habitat and biology ==
Epinephelus faveatus is found in shallow waters over reefs and rocky substrates. Off southern India it has been recorded on inshore rocky reefs and reefs covered in silt which have been colonised by algae and sponges. This is a small grouper and a female taken off Sri Lanka with a standard length of 17 centimetres (6.7 in) was found to be sexually mature.

== Taxonomy ==
Epinephelus faveatus was first formally described as Serranus faveatus in 1828 by the French zoologist Achille Valenciennes (1794–1865) with the type locality given as Mauritius where this species is not known to occur. Alternatively Ceylon is given as the location of other types.

== Utilisation ==
Epinephelus faveatus is a relatively small species and has a low market value; it is likely only taken as a bycatch in artisanal fisheries.
