= Epinephelus macrospilos =

Scientific classification
- Kingdom: Animalia
- Phylum: Chordata
- Class: Actinopterygii
- Order: Perciformes
- Family: Epinephelidae
- Genus: Epinephelus
- Species: E. macrospilos

Binomial name
- Epinephelus macrospilos (Bleeker, 1855)

Species of fish

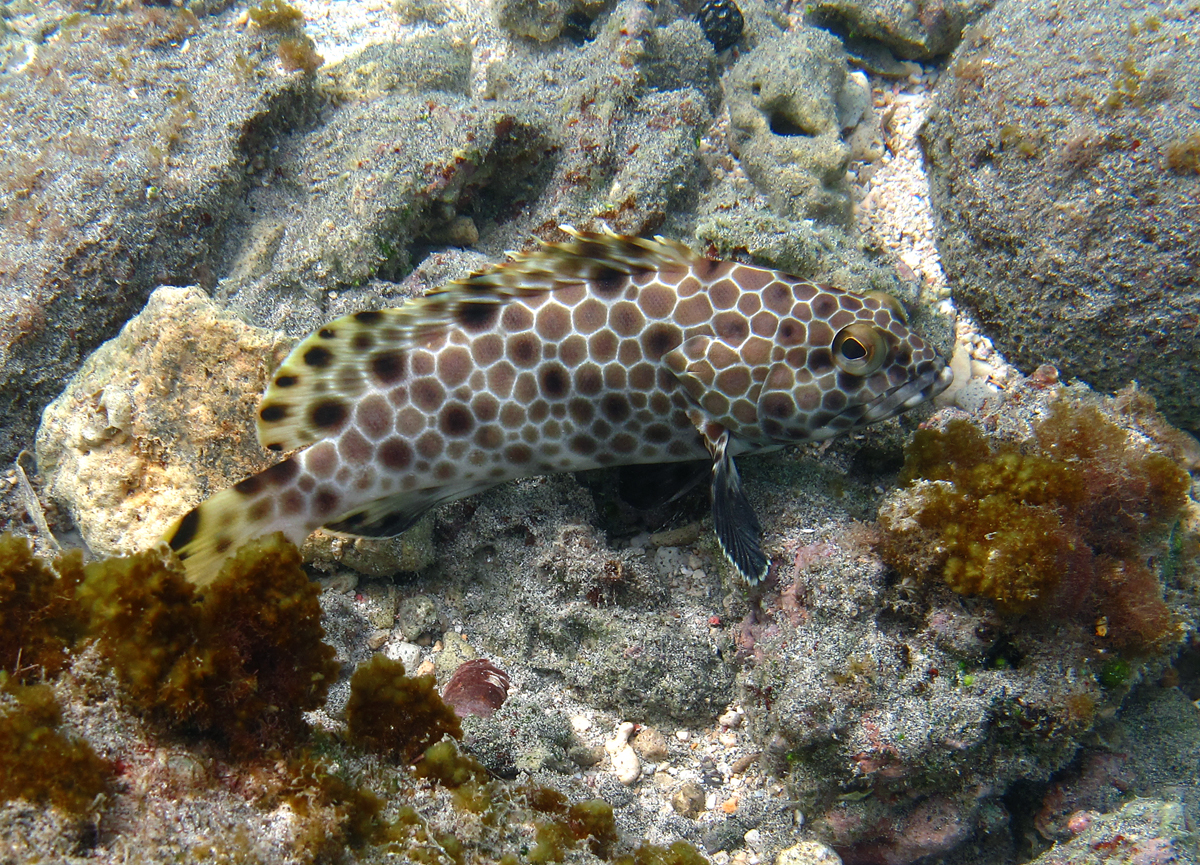

Epinephelus macrospilos, commonly known as the snub-nose grouper, is a species of ray-finned fish, a grouper from the subfamily Epinephelinae which is part of the family Serranidae, which also includes the anthias and sea basses.

== Distribution ==
It is found in the Indo-Pacific region from east coast of Africa to the central Pacific, in lagoon and seaweed

reefs to the depth of 44 m. It feeds on crustaceans, fishes, and some cephalopods. The maximum size of E. macrospilos is 43 cm, weighing up to 2 kg.
