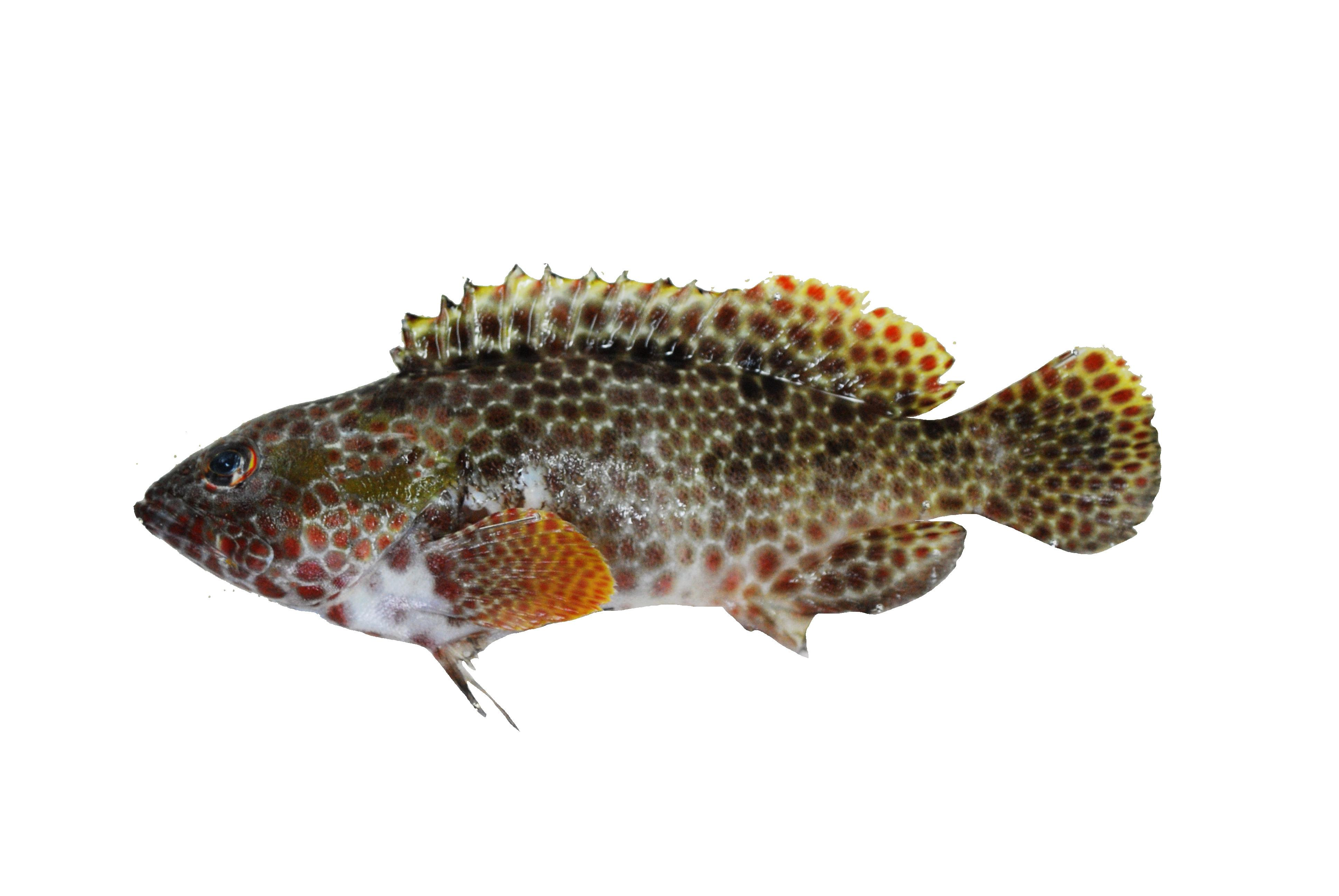

Conservation status
- Least Concern (IUCN 3.1)

Scientific classification
- Kingdom: Animalia
- Phylum: Chordata
- Class: Actinopterygii
- Division: Teleostei
- Order: Perciformes
- Family: Epinephelidae
- Genus: Epinephelus
- Species: E. hexagonatus

Binomial name
- Epinephelus hexagonatus (Bloch & Schneider, 1801)

= Epinephelus hexagonatus =

Species of fish

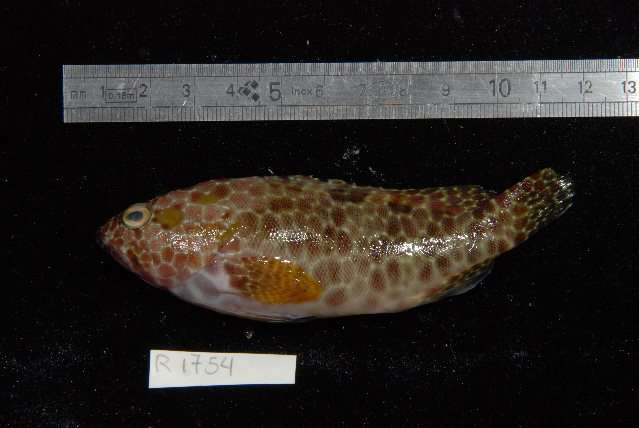

Epinephelus hexagonatus, commonly referred to as the star-spotted groper or the wirenet rockcod, is a species of grouper from the family Serranidae, which also includes the anthias and sea basses. It is mostly found in the west Indian Ocean.

== Description ==
E. hexagonatus is named after a polygonal pattern of brown spots on its skin with a white triangle between each spot and its neighbour. These spots are present across the whole body, but five notably darker spot-clusters lie along the base of the dorsal fin. Its colouring provides camouflage from predators in reefs.

== Habitat ==
E. hexagonatus is found in shallow outer-reef areas exposed to surge, usually depths of less than six meters, but can be found ten meters or more. Its diet mainly consists of fishes and crustaceans. This fish grows up to 26 cm long.
