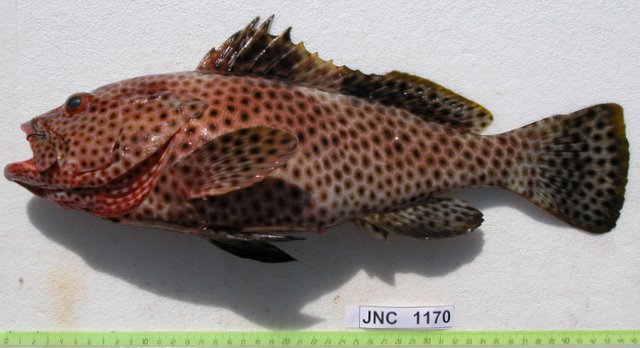

Conservation status
- Least Concern (IUCN 3.1)

Scientific classification
- Kingdom: Animalia
- Phylum: Chordata
- Class: Actinopterygii
- Order: Perciformes
- Suborder: Percoidei
- Family: Epinephelidae
- Genus: Epinephelus
- Species: E. maculatus

Binomial name
- Epinephelus maculatus (Bloch, 1790)

Synonyms
- Holocentrus maculatus Bloch, 1790; Holocentrus albofuscus Lacépède, 1802; Holocentrus albo-fuscus Lacepède, 1802; Serranus sebae Bleeker, 1854; Plectropoma kulas Thiollière, 1857; Serranus medurensis Günther, 1873

= Epinephelus maculatus =

Species of fish

Epinephelus maculatus, the highfin grouper, blackfin cod or brown-spotted rock-cod, marbled rock-cod or spotted grouper, is a species of marine ray-finned fish, a grouper from the subfamily Epinephelinae which is part of the family Serranidae, which also includes the anthias and sea basses. It is found in the Indo-Pacific region.

== Description ==
Epinephelus maculatus has a body with a standard length which is 2.8 to 3.1 times its depth. The dorsal profile of the head is convex and the area between the eyes is either flat or marginally convex. The preopercle has a notch above the angle where there are enlarged serrations. The dorsal fin contains 11 spines and 15-17 soft rays while the anal fin has 3 spines and 8 soft rays. The dorsal fin is highest in its anterior spiny part and membranes between the spines are slightly indented. in adults and rounded in juveniles. The caudal fin is convex or rounded. The head and body are covered with regularly spaced brown spots which group into hexagonal shapes on adults of lengths between 25 and 45 centimetres (9.8 and 17.7 in). The juveniles are initially black with blotched with white and as they grow they develops their spots. This species has a maximum published total length of 60.5 centimetres (23.8 in).

== Distribution ==
Epinephelus maculatus is occurs in the eastern Indian Ocean and Western Pacific Ocean. Its range extends from the Cocos (Keeling) Islands east to Micronesia and Samoa, south to Australia and north to the Ryukyu Islands and Ogasawara Islands of Japan. In Australia is it found around the offshore reefs of Western Australia, the Ashmore Reef in the Timor Sea and Lord Howe Island in the Tasman Sea as well as along the eastern coast from the northern Great Barrier Reef of Queensland south as far as Sydney.

== Habitat and biology ==
Epinephelus maculatus is found on coastal and offshore coral and rocky reefs at depths from 2 to 100 metres (6.6 to 328.1 ft), frequently occurring over open sand near the base of these reefs. The juveniles have been recorded from shallow coral rubble. It is a predatory species which preys mainly on small fish, crabs and octopuses. They have been observed moving between reefs and undertaking journeys of at least 5 to 10 kilometres (3.1 to 6.2 miles). Compared with other groupers this is a species which has a fast growth rate and a high population turnover rate. They have been recorded living as long as 13 years, females mature at 2,8 years old while males are mature at 4 years old. They may for spawning aggregations, otherwise solitary.

== Taxonomy ==
Epinephelus maculatus was first formally described as Holocentrus maculatus in 1790 by the German medical doctor and naturalist Marcus Elieser Bloch (1723–1799) with the type locality given as the "East Indies". This species is one of a group of related members of the genus Epinephelus known as "reticulated coral groupers" along with E. bilobatus, E. faveatus, E. hexagonatus, E. macrospilos, E. melanostigma, E. merra, E. quoyanus and E. spilotoceps. These species have frequently been mistaken for each other and as a result many specimens in museums have been misidentified.

== Utilisation ==
Epinephelus maculatus is mainly taken by subsistence and artisanal fisheries and is not normally regarded as being as valuable as other species of grouper. It does appear in the Hong Kong live food market. In Indonesia it is caught using hook and line, spears and traps. In some regions the flesh may be toxic due to the presence ciguatoxins.
