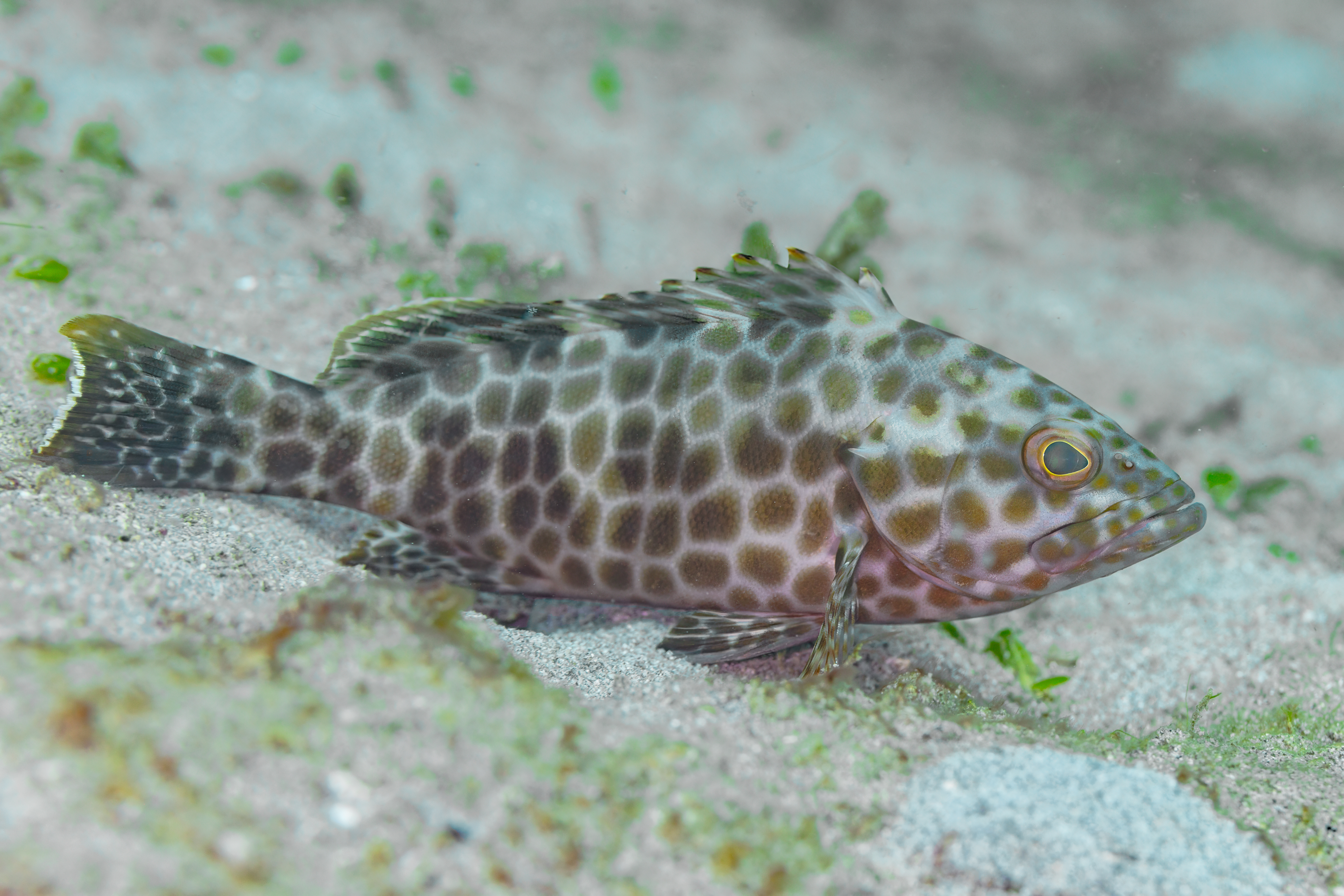

Conservation status
- Least Concern (IUCN 3.1)

Scientific classification
- Kingdom: Animalia
- Phylum: Chordata
- Class: Actinopterygii
- Order: Perciformes
- Family: Epinephelidae
- Genus: Epinephelus
- Species: E. quoyanus

Binomial name
- Epinephelus quoyanus (Valenciennes, 1830)

Synonyms
- Serranus quoyanus Valenciennes, 1830; Serranus gilberti Richardson, 1842; Epinephelus gilberti (Richardson, 1842); Serranus megachir Richardson, 1846; Cephalopholis megachir (Richardson, 1846); Epinephelus megachir (Richardson, 1846); Serranus pardalis Bleeker, 1848; Perca melanocelidota Gronow, 1854; Serranus carinatus Alleyne & Macleay, 1877; Serranus alatus Alleyne & Macleay, 1877

= Longfin grouper =

Species of fish

The longfin grouper (Epinephelus quoyanus), also known as the longfin rockcod, bar-breasted rock-cod, Gilbert's rock-cod, honeycomb rockcod, spotted groper or wirenet cod, is a species of marine ray-finned fish, a grouper from the subfamily Epinephelinae which is part of the family Serranidae, which also includes the anthias and sea basses. It is found in the Western Pacific Ocean.

== Description ==
The longfin grouper has a body with a standard length which is 2.8 to 3.2 times its depth. The dorsal profile of the head is smoothly curved. The preopercle is rounded or subangular while the gill cover has a nearly straight upper edge. The dorsal fin contains 11 spines and 16-18 soft rays while the anal fin has 3 spines and 8 soft rays. The caudal fin is rounded while the pectoral fin is around twice the length of the head. The overall colour is whitish on the head, body and fins and it is marked with many sizeable closely set hexagonal to roundish dark brown to blackish spots. On the upper head and body the spots are closer together and form a reticulated pattern while on the lower head and body the spots are more widely spaced and they are less well defined. There is a pattern of similar dark spots on dorsal, anal and caudal fins. There are two dark bands on the breast which join underneath the pectoral fin and almost join at the gill slitcreating an isolated pale patch on the ventral part of the breast and there is another pale area between the upper dark and a dark blotch that normally covers most of the base of the pectoral fin. There are irregular dark brown bands and blotches on the throat and the ventral surface of the breast., The dark spots on the head are smaller towards the snout but these are always notably larger than the nostrils, and there is a squarish white or pale area on the cheek at rear end of the upper jaw. The rear margin of pectoral, anal and caudal fins is mostly dusky with faint dark spots while the front margin leading edge of pelvic fins with white line and broad blackish submarginal band. This species attains a maximum total length of 40 centimetres (16 in).

== Distribution ==
The longfin grouper is found in the Indo-West Pacific, especially in the Indomalayan region. In the Indian Ocean it has only been recorded from the Andaman Islands and off Australia. In the Western Pacific Ocean its range extends from Japan and South Korea in the north south to Australia and east as far as the Solomon Islands. In Australia, it is distributed from Shark Bay in Western Australia along the northern coast and as far south as northern New South Wales, including the islands of the Great Barrier Reef.

== Habitat and biology ==
The longfin grouper is found on silty reefs in coastal waters at depths of less than 50 metres (160 ft). It is a sedentary species which feeds on worms, smaller fishes and crustaceans. This species is a protogynous hermaphrodite and the females become sexually mature at around 24 centimetres (9.4 in) and when they are 1.8 years old. The change in sex to males takes place when they have attained a total length of around 33 centimetres (13 in). The long and fleshy pectoral fins appear to be used to support the fish's body as it rests on the substrate.

== Taxonomy ==
The longfin grouper was first formally described as Serranus quoyanus in 1830 by the French zoologist Achille Valenciennes (1794–1865) with the type locality given as New Guinea. The specific name honours the French naval surgeon, zoologist and anatomist Jean René Constant Quoy (1790–1869) who, with Joseph Paul Gaimard, reported this species.

== Utilisation ==
The longfin grouper is of some value to fisheries in Hong Kong and Taiwan, occurring in the live reef fish food markets of Hong Kong and probably on other regions of southeast Asia. The small juveniles are caught in the summer and the larger fish are caught using gill nets, hand-lines and traps. Once caught the wild hatched juveniles are grown-out in cages in southeast Asia, albeit on a small scale.
