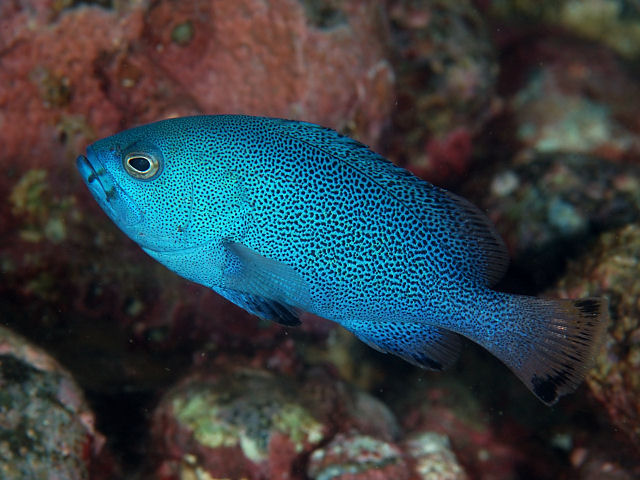

Conservation status
- Least Concern (IUCN 3.1)

Scientific classification
- Kingdom: Animalia
- Phylum: Chordata
- Class: Actinopterygii
- Order: Perciformes
- Family: Epinephelidae
- Genus: Epinephelus
- Species: E. cyanopodus

Binomial name
- Epinephelus cyanopodus (Richardson, 1846)

Synonyms
- Serranus cyanopodus Richardson, 1846; Serranus hoedtii Bleeker, 1855; Epinephelus hoedtii (Bleeker, 1855); Serranus punctatissimus Günther, 1859; Homalogrystes luctuosus De Vis, 1882; Epinephelus suitonis Tanaka, 1915; Epinephelus kohleri Schultz, 1953

= Epinephelus cyanopodus =

Species of fish

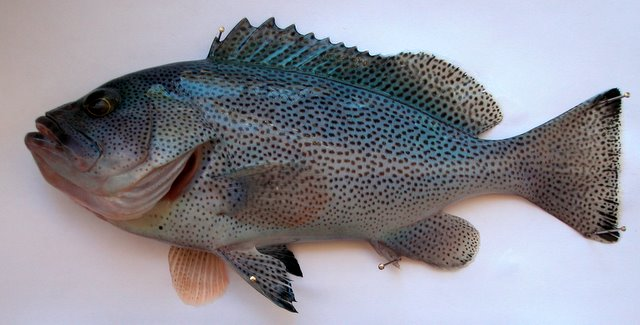
Epinephelus cyanopodus from New Caledonia, young, 135-mm-long specimen

Epinephelus cyanopodus, the speckled blue grouper, also known as the blue maori, purple rock cod, speckled grouper or yellowfin grouper, is a species of marine ray-finned fish, a grouper from the subfamily Epinephelinae which is part of the family Serranidae, which also includes the anthias and sea basses. It is found in the Western Pacific Ocean where it occurs in corals.

== Description ==
Epinephelus cyanopodus has a compressed body which has a standard length which is 2.4 to 2.7 times its depth with a steep dorsal profile to the head and a noticeably convex area between the eyes. The preopercle does not have a sharp angle and its edge has fine serrations which are slightly enlarged at the angle. The gill cover has inconspicuous spines and a straight upper edge. The dorsal fin contains 11 spines and 16-17 spines while the anal fin has 3 spines and 8 soft rays. The spiny part of the dorsal fin has the membrane between the spines either not incised or having slight incisions. There are 63-75 scales in the lateral line. This species is overall greyish in colour and is covered in irregular small dark dots with fewer larger black spots. The juveniles are yellowish but as they mature, they become more greyish-blue until when they reach a length of 15–20 centimetres (5.9–7.9 in) only the fins are yellowish. The yellow fins will fade with age. This species attains a total length of 122 centimetres (48 in) and a maximum weight of 17.3 kilograms (38 lb).

== Distribution ==
Epinephelus cyanopodus is found in the Western Pacific Ocean from the South China Sea and the Gulf of Thailand east to the Marshall Islands and Fiji, north to southern Japan and south to eastern Australia and the Tasman Sea. In Australia it is found along the Great Barrier Reef and from northern Queensland to Sydney.

== Habitat and biology ==
Epinephelus cyanopodus is normally found near isolated coral heads in lagoons or bays, although it has also been collected in outer reefs. It is not cryptic and is normally encountered in the water column several meters above the substrate. It is frequently caught at night. This is a predatory species which feeds mainly on fishes and crustaceans which live in the sand like snake eels and box crabs. During the breeding season this species forms spawning aggregations, often mixed with other grouper species such as E. polyphekadion and E. fuscoguttatus. However, the biology of this species is poorly understood. It is found at depths from 2 to 150 metres (6.6 to 492.1 ft).

== Taxonomy ==
Epinephelus cyanopodus was first formally described as Serranus cyanopodus by the Scottish naval surgeon, naturalist and arctic explorer Sir John Richardson (1787-1865) with the type locality given as China. This species is replaced in the Indian Ocean by the blue-and-yellow grouper (Epinephelus flavocaeruleus).

== Utilisation ==
Epinephelus cyanopodus is a species which is subjected to fishing by both commercial and recreational fisheries in parts of its range. It is marketed in Hong Kong as a live reef fish. The juveniles are captured for sale in the aquarium trade. However, this species will grow too large for home aquaria.
