= Pseudorhabdosynochus mcmichaeli =

- Body and sclerotised parts

Scientific classification
- Kingdom: Animalia
- Phylum: Platyhelminthes
- Class: Monogenea
- Order: Dactylogyridea
- Family: Diplectanidae
- Genus: Pseudorhabdosynochus
- Species: P. mcmichaeli

Binomial name
- Pseudorhabdosynochus mcmichaeli Kritsky, Bakenhaster & Adams, 2015

Species of worm

Pseudorhabdosynochus mcmichaeli is a diplectanid monogenean parasitic on the gills of the scamp, Mycteroperca phenax. It has been described by Kritsky, Bakenhaster and Adams in 2015.

== Etymology ==
The species was named in honor of Robert "Bob" McMichael, Jr., Founding Director of the Florida Fish and Wildlife Conservation Commission Fish and Wildlife Research Institute's Fisheries-Independent Monitoring Program, commemorating his longtime research on Floridian marine parasites. Specimens of groupers he had collected in 1980 were evaluated in the study done by Kritsky, Bakenhaster and Adams in 2015, and he additionally actively accommodated their research until his retirement.

== Description ==
Pseudorhabdosynochus mcmichaeli is a small monogenean, 400 μm in length. The species has the general characteristics of other species of Pseudorhabdosynochus, with a flat body and a posterior haptor, which is the organ by which the monogenean attaches itself to the gill of is host. The haptor bears two squamodiscs, one ventral and one dorsal. The sclerotized male copulatory organ, or "quadriloculate organ", has the shape of a bean with four internal chambers, as in other species of Pseudorhabdosynochus. The vagina includes a sclerotized part, which is a complex structure.

== Diagnosis ==
Kritsky, Bakenhaster & Adams (2015) wrote that Pseudorhabdosynochus mcmichaeli was easily distinguished from all Pseudorhabdosynochus species from western Atlantic waters by its unique vaginal sclerite. Within the region, it is probably most similar to the congeners infecting other Mycteroperca species. In P. mcmichaeli, however, the vaginal sclerite has two tandem chambers, each with comparatively thin walls, while all other species infecting Mycteroperca species, including P. kritskyi, P. capurroi, P. vascellum, P. hyphessometochus, P. contubernalis, and P. mycteropercae, possess a vaginal sclerite with a single comparatively thick-walled chamber. Based on the similarities of the respective vaginal sclerites, P. mcmichaeli most closely resembles P. jeanloui, a species described by Knoff, Cohen, Cárdenas, Cárdenas-Callirgos and Gomes in 2015 from the Pacific creole-fish Paranthias colonus off Peru. It differs from P. jeanloui by being a much smaller parasite, by having a less expanded base of the smaller ventral anchor and tapered ends of the ventral bar, and in the fine details of the vaginal sclerite.

== Hosts and localities ==
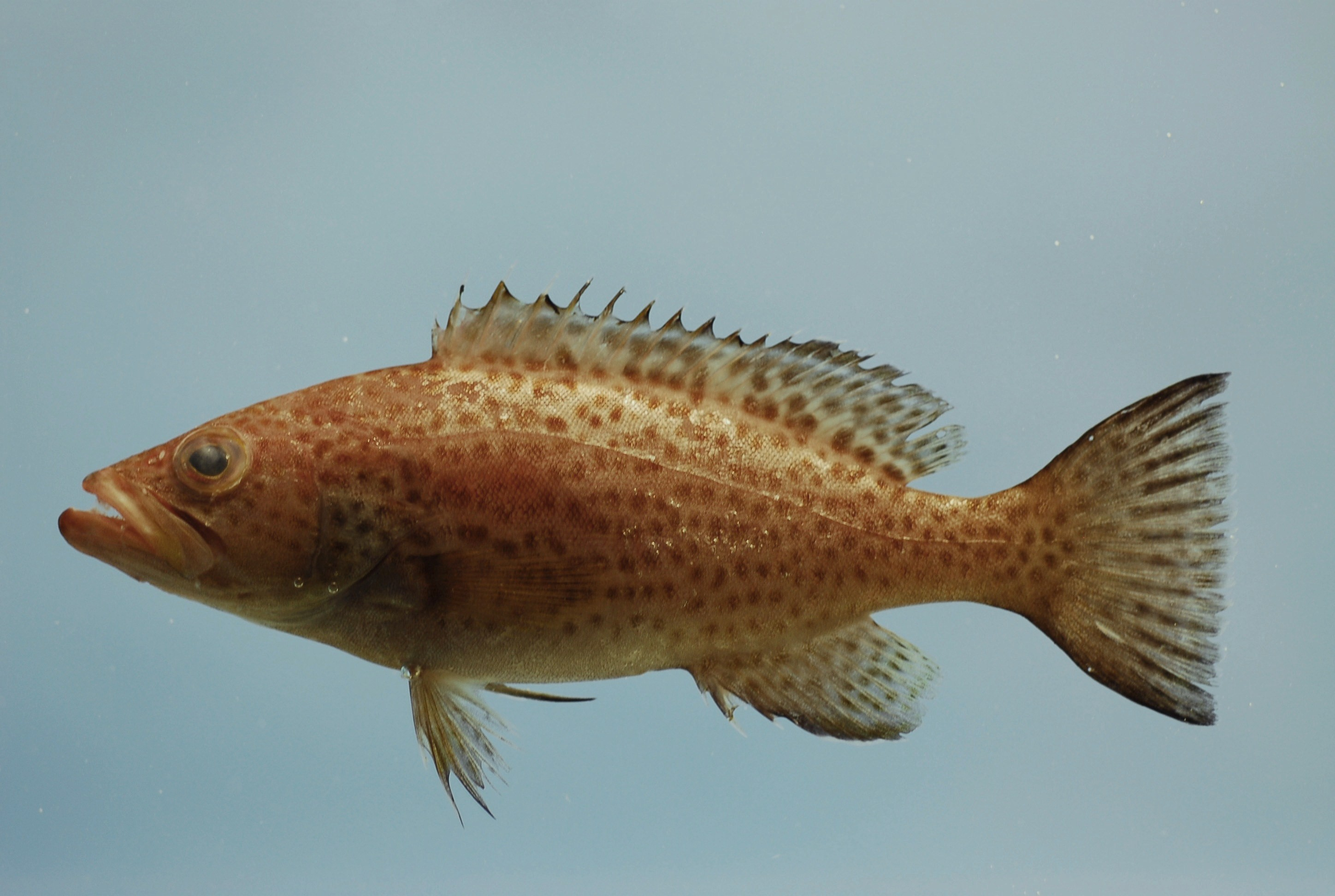
The scamp, Mycteroperca phenax is the type-host of Pseudorhabdosynochus mcmichaeli

The type-host and only recorded host is the scamp, Mycteroperca phenax. The type-locality is Florida Middle Grounds, Gulf of Mexico; the species has also been recorded from the Gulf of Mexico, 25 miles west of Tampa Bay, Florida.
