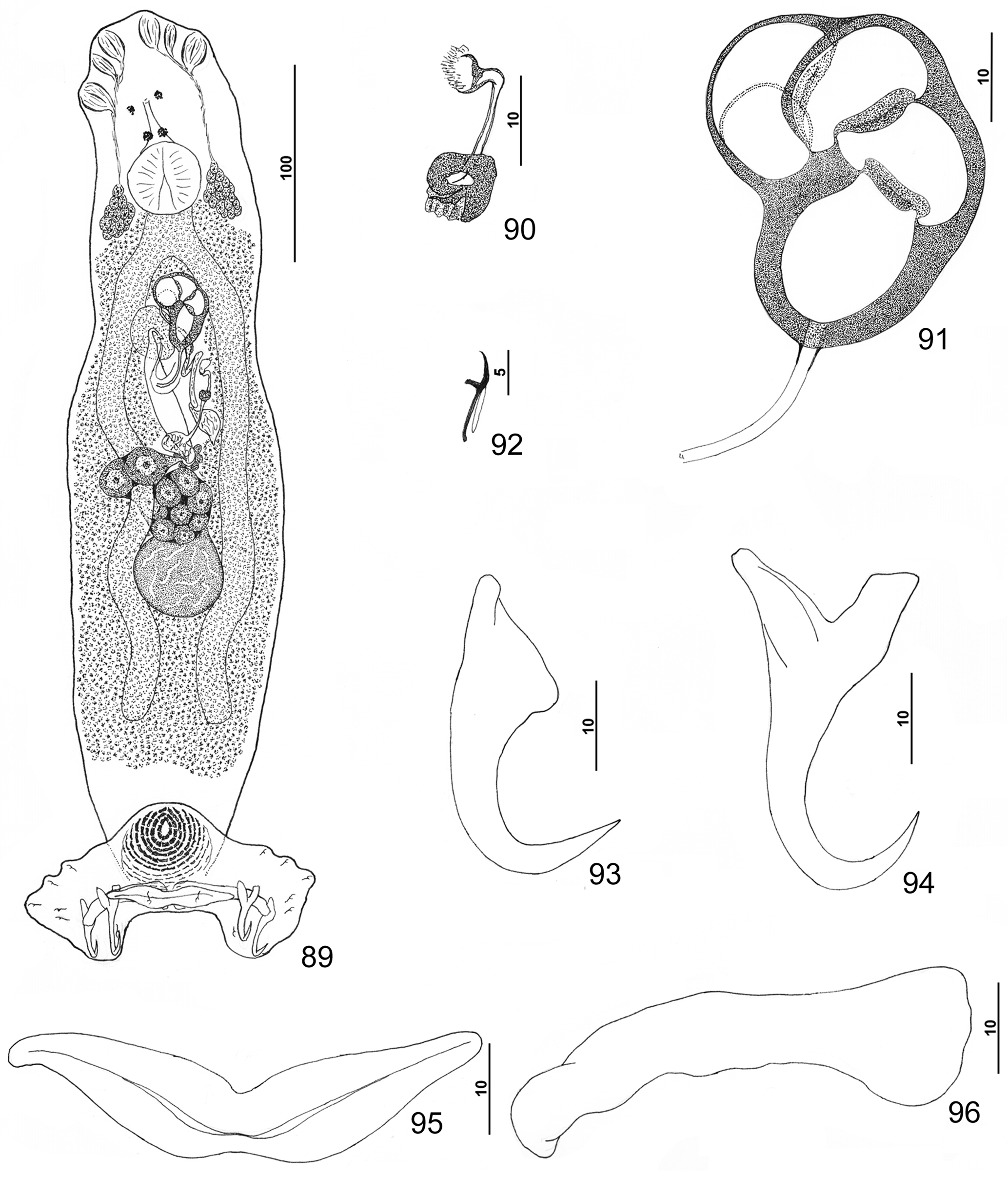
- Body and sclerotised parts

Scientific classification
- Kingdom: Animalia
- Phylum: Platyhelminthes
- Class: Monogenea
- Order: Dactylogyridea
- Family: Diplectanidae
- Genus: Pseudorhabdosynochus
- Species: P. vascellum

Binomial name
- Pseudorhabdosynochus vascellum Kritsky, Bakenhaster & Adams, 2015

= Pseudorhabdosynochus vascellum =

Species of flatworm

Pseudorhabdosynochus vascellum is a diplectanid monogenean parasitic on the gills of the scamp, Mycteroperca phenax. It has been described by Kritsky, Bakenhaster and Adams in 2015.

== Description ==
Pseudorhabdosynochus vascellum is a small monogenean. The species has the general characteristics of other species of Pseudorhabdosynochus, with a flat body and a posterior haptor, which is the organ by which the monogenean attaches itself to the gill of is host. The haptor bears two squamodiscs, one ventral and one dorsal. The sclerotized male copulatory organ, or "quadriloculate organ", has the shape of a bean with four internal chambers, as in other species of Pseudorhabdosynochus. The vagina includes a sclerotized part, which is a complex structure.

== Etymology ==
The specific name (a noun) is from Latin (vascellum = a small vessel) and refers to the small chamber of the vaginal sclerite.

== Diagnosis ==
Kritsky, Bakenhaster & Adams (2015) wrote that Pseudorhabdosynochus vascellum belongs to the group of species of Pseudorhabdosynochus parasitizing groupers assigned to Mycteroperca and characterized by having a distally reflexed tube and a single chamber in the vaginal sclerite. The group includes P. kritskyi, P. capurroi, P. vascellum, P. contubernalis, P. hyphessometochus, and P. mycteropercae. Except for P. hyphessometochus, P. vascellum is easily distinguished from these species by its small thick-walled chamber of the vaginal sclerite having a meager cavity. Pseudorhabdosynochus hyphessometochus also possesses a vaginal sclerite with a thick wall of the chamber, but the cavity of the chamber in this species is comparatively large. Pseudorhabdosynochus vascellum is probably closest morphologically to P. contubernalis by possessing a delicate, almost nonexistent cone of the male copulatory organ.

== Hosts and localities ==
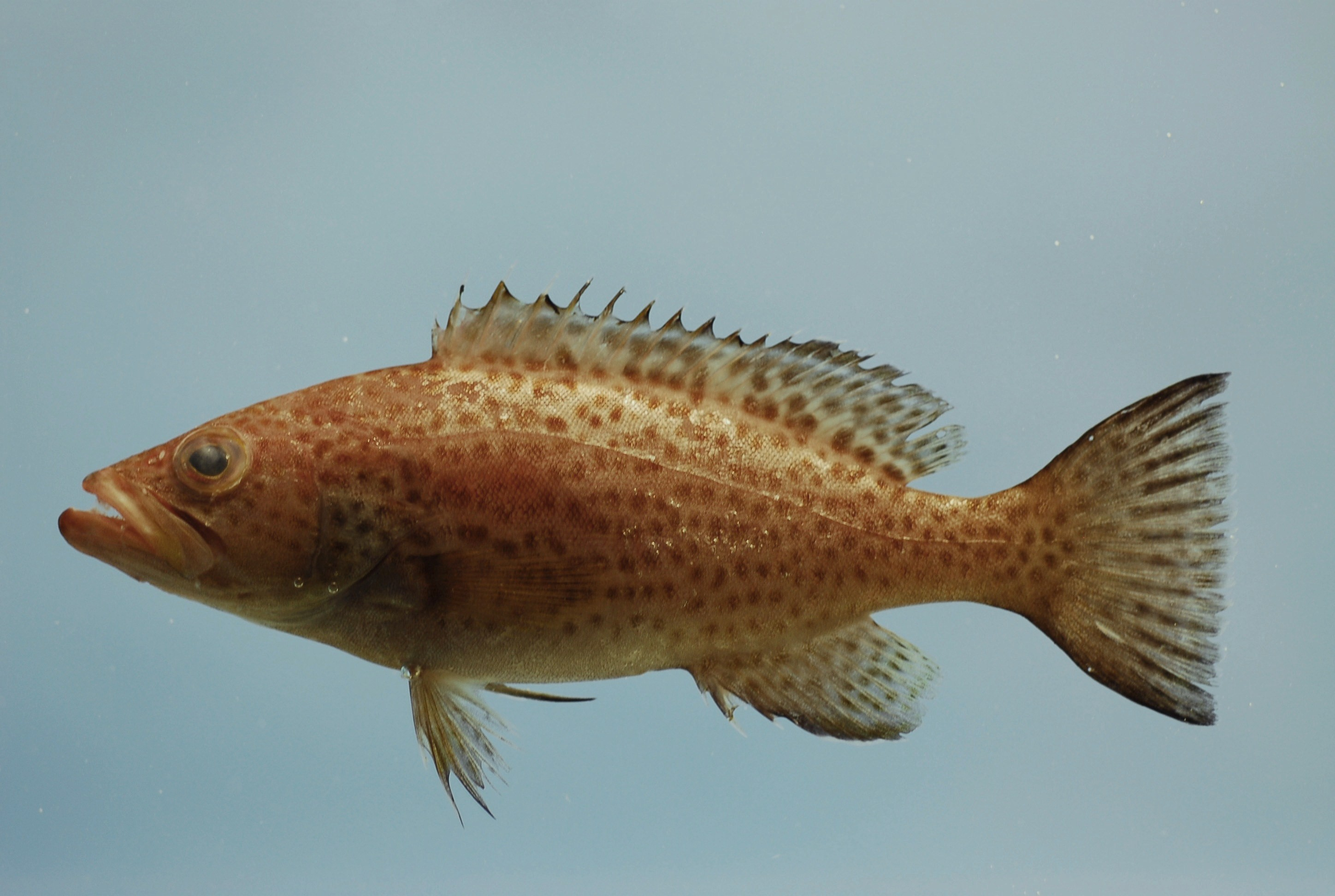
The scamp, Mycteroperca phenax is the type-host of Pseudorhabdosynochus vascellum

The type-host and only recorded host of Pseudorhabdosynochus vascellum is the scamp, Mycteroperca phenax (Serranidae: Epinephelinae). The type-locality, and only known locality, is Pinnacles Reef System, off Mississippi Sound, South of Pascagoula, Mississippi.
