= Pseudorhabdosynochus contubernalis =

- Body and sclerotised parts

Scientific classification
- Kingdom: Animalia
- Phylum: Platyhelminthes
- Class: Monogenea
- Order: Dactylogyridea
- Family: Diplectanidae
- Genus: Pseudorhabdosynochus
- Species: P. contubernalis

Binomial name
- Pseudorhabdosynochus contubernalis Kritsky, Bakenhaster & Adams, 2015

Species of flatworm

Pseudorhabdosynochus contubernalis is a diplectanid monogenean parasitic on the gills of the Scamp, Mycteroperca phenax. It has been described by Kritsky, Bakenhaster and Adams in 2015.

== Description ==
Pseudorhabdosynochus contubernalis is a small monogenean. The species has the general characteristics of other species of Pseudorhabdosynochus, with a flat body and a posterior haptor, which is the organ by which the monogenean attaches itself to the gill of is host. The haptor bears two squamodiscs, one ventral and one dorsal. The sclerotized male copulatory organ, or "quadriloculate organ", has the shape of a bean with four internal chambers, as in other species of Pseudorhabdosynochus. The vagina includes a sclerotized part, which is a complex structure.

== Etymology ==
The specific name (a noun) is from Latin (contubernalis = a companion or comrade) and refers to its co-occurrence with P. vascellum on Mycteroperca phenax.

== Diagnosis ==
Kritsky, Bakenhaster & Adams (2015) wrote that Pseudorhabdosynochus contubernalis most closely resembles P. vascellum. It differs from P. vascellum by its larger overall size (body length about 700 μm vs. 500 μm) and length of the male copulatory organ (about 60 μm vs. 40 μm). In addition, the proximal two chambers of the male copulatory organ of P. contubernalis have comparatively thin walls which frequently have collapsed or are absent. Pseudorhabdosynochus contubernalis is a member of the group of species of Pseudorhabdosynochus parasitizing groupers assigned to Mycteroperca and characterized by having a distally reflexed tube and a single chamber in the vaginal sclerite. The group includes P. kritskyi, P. capurroi, P. vascellum, P. contubernalis, P. hyphessometochus, and P. mycteropercae. P. contubernalis differs from all of these species by having a scaled tegument on the peduncle.

== Hosts and localities ==
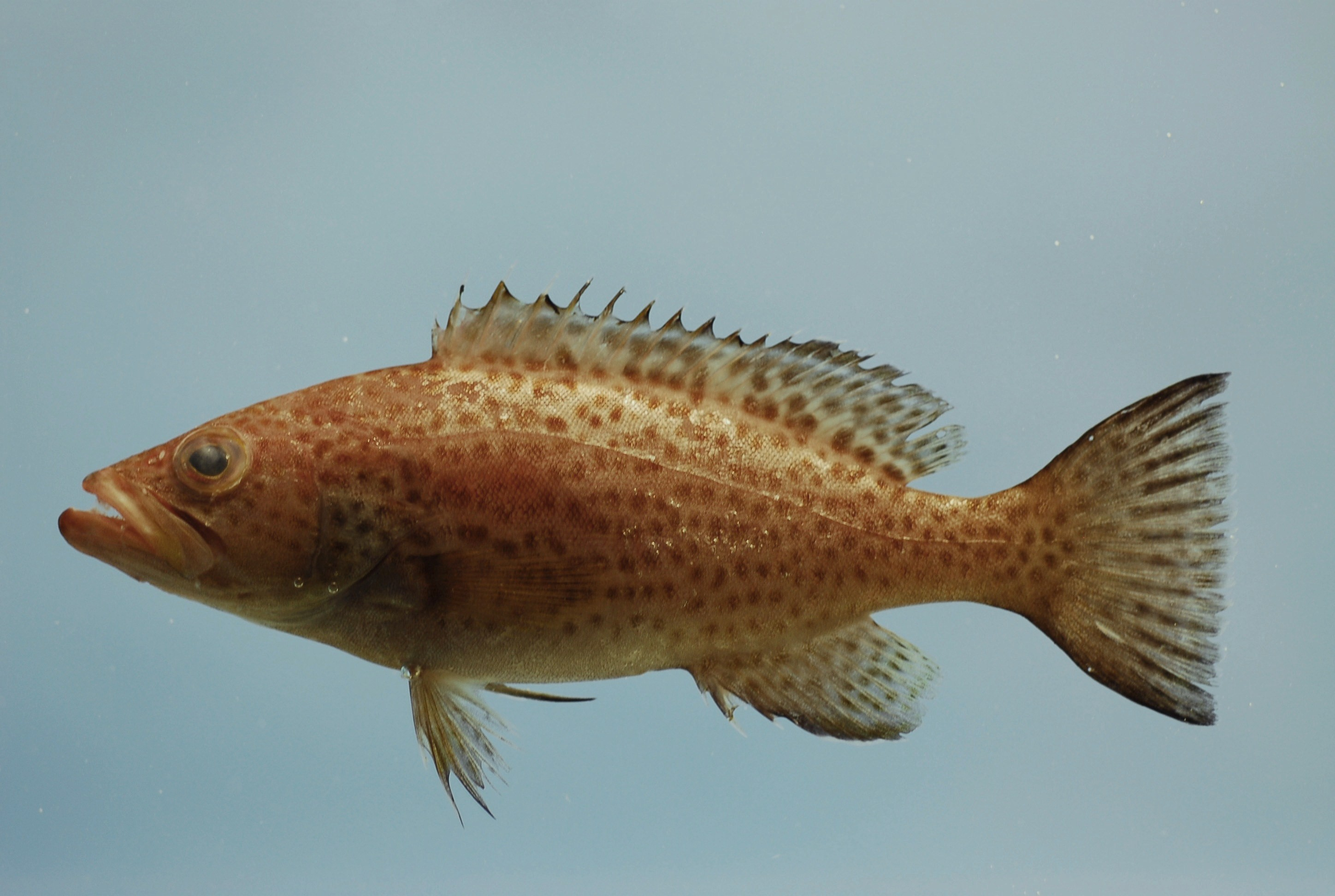
The scamp, Mycteroperca phenax is the type-host of Pseudorhabdosynochus vascellum

The type-host and only recorded host of Pseudorhabdosynochus vascellum is the scamp, Mycteroperca phenax (Serranidae: Epinephelinae). The type-locality, and only known locality, is Pinnacles Reef System, off Mississippi Sound, South of Pascagoula, Mississippi, Mississippi.
