= Hybrid grouper =

Scientific classification
- Domain: Eukaryota
- Kingdom: Animalia
- Phylum: Chordata
- Class: Actinopterygii
- Order: Perciformes
- Family: Serranidae
- Subfamily: Epinephelinae
- Hybrid: Epinephelus fuscoguttatus × Epinephelus lanceolatus

Hybrid fish

The first hybrid grouper was a fish cross-bred by researchers from Universiti Malaysia Sabah (UMS), Malaysia, in collaboration with researchers from the Borneo Marine Research Institute of UMS, the Fisheries Development Authority of Malaysia (LKIM) and Kindai University of Japan, represented by Shigeharu Senoo of UMS.

The first hybrid grouper was produced by fertilising the eggs of the tiger grouper (Epinephelus fuscoguttatus) with the sperm of the giant grouper (Epinephelus lanceolatus) through the in-vitro fertilisation (IVF) technique. It is commonly known as Sabah grouper or pearl grouper.
