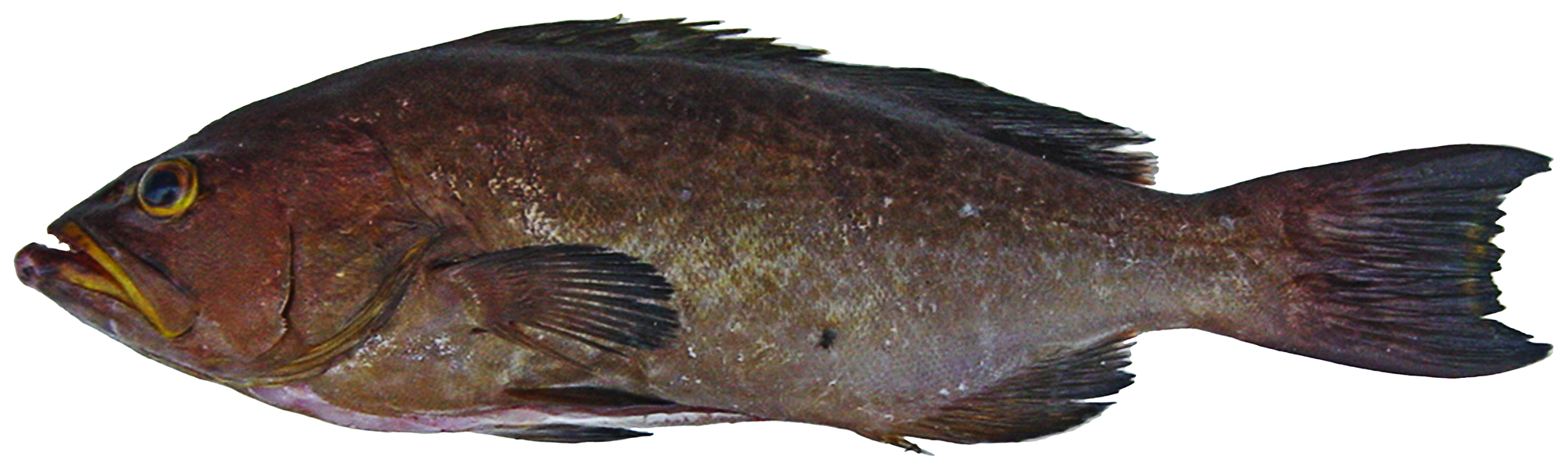

Conservation status
- Vulnerable (IUCN 3.1)

Scientific classification
- Kingdom: Animalia
- Phylum: Chordata
- Class: Actinopterygii
- Order: Perciformes
- Family: Epinephelidae
- Genus: Mycteroperca
- Species: M. interstitialis

Binomial name
- Mycteroperca interstitialis (Poey, 1860)

Synonyms
- Serranus interstitialis Poey, 1860; Labrus guaza Linnaeus, 1758; Serranus dimidiatus Poey, 1860; Mycteroperca dimidiata (Poey, 1860); Serranus falcatus Poey, 1860; Mycteroperca falcata (Poey, 1860); Mycteroperca calliura Poey, 1865; Trisotropis chlorostomus Poey, 1867; Mycteroperca roquensis Martín Salazar, 1956

= Mycteroperca interstitialis =

Species of fish

The yellowmouth grouper (Mycteroperca interstitialis), also known as the crossband rockfish, grey mannock, hamlet, harlequin rockfish, princess rockfish, rockfish, salmon grouper, salmon rock fish or scamp, is a species of marine ray-finned fish, a grouper from the subfamily Epinephelinae which is part of the family Serranidae, which also includes the anthias and sea basses. It is found in the Caribbean and in the tropical waters of the Atlantic Ocean. It is also found in pockets in Brazil. It is a fairly large fish and it gets its name from the yellow around its mouth.

== Description ==
Mycteropreca insterstitialis has an elongate, robust and compressed body which is no deeper at the origin of the dorsal fin than it as the origin of the anal fin. It standard length is 3.0 to 3.4 times its depth. The preopercle is angular and has an obvious lobe at its angle, this lobe has enlarged serrations, there is a clear incision in the preopercle above this lobe. The dorsal fin contains 11 spines and 16-18 soft rays while the anal fin contains 3 spines and 10-12 soft rays. The dorsal fin has a pointed rear margin while the anal fin has a pointed margin at its lower posterior edge in adults. The caudal fin is rounded. The adults are pale brownish-grey in background colour marked with closely set small brown spots on the dorsal half of the head and body. In some fish the body is marked with irregular dark bars. The margin of the spiny part of the dorsal fin and the inside of the mouth and along the outer margin of the rear part of the jaws is yellow. The pectoral fins have dark coloured rays with pale membranes between them and a whitish margin. There is a dark line above the rear of the upper jaw. Juveniles, and subadults, have the dorsal part of the head and body coloured dark brown, although this may be broken into wide dark bars or saddles, changing abruptly to white ventrally. There is a white stripe running from the tip of the lower jaw along the top of the snout and head, and along the base of the dorsal fin. The maximum published total length for this species is 84 centimetres (33 in), although fish around 40 centimetres (16 in) in length are more common. The maximum published weight is 10.2 kilograms (22 lb 8 oz).

== Distribution ==
Mycteroperca interstitialis is found in the western Atlantic Ocean. Its distribution runs south along the coast of the United States from Cape Hatteras in North Carolina to the Bahamas, including Bermuda, and into the Gulf of Mexico, throughout the Caribbean Sea to Brazil. In Brazil it is found from Maranhão to Santa Catarina, including the islands of Trindade and Fernando de Noronha.

== Habitat and biology ==
Mycteroperca interstitialis is mainly found over rocky or coral bottoms from the low water mark down to at least 55 metres (180 ft), although small and medium-sized fishes are frequently recorded in mangrove-lined lagoons. It is commoner around islands than it is in continental waters. It feeds on fishes. such as silversides, brown chromis (Chromis multilineata) and striped parrotfish (Scarus iseri) The juveniles are aggressive mimics of the clown wrasse (Halichoeres maculipinna), using their resemblance to allow them to approach potential prey. Spawning takes place in all months of the year, peaking in April and May. For most of the year they spawn in small groups but during the April and May peak season they form large spawning aggregations. The eggs and young are pelagic and there is no parental care. Females can become sexually mature at 2 years old, but 4 years old is more normal, They are protogynous hermaphrodites, and between 5 and 14 years old the females change sex into males.

== Taxonomy ==
Mycteroperca interstitialis was first formally described as Serranus interstitialis in 1860 by the Cuban zoologist Felipe Poey (1799-1891) with Cuba being given as the type locality.

== Utilisation and conservation ==
Mycteroperca interstitialis is an important species in the fisheries of Bermuda, the Gulf of Mexico, and throughout the Caribbean where it is caught with hook-and-line, traps, and spear. It is a scarce species and is not normally a primary target for fisheries which target M. bonaci and M. phenax. There have been reports of significant declines in many areas where there are large-scale grouper fisheries. Conservation measures which have been undertaken have not been effective and more measures are required and so the IUCN have classified it as Vulnerable.
