= Clown wrasse =

The name Clown wrasse may refer to either:

- Halichoeres maculipinna

or

- Coris aygula, also known as the Clown coris

== Pictorial identification ==
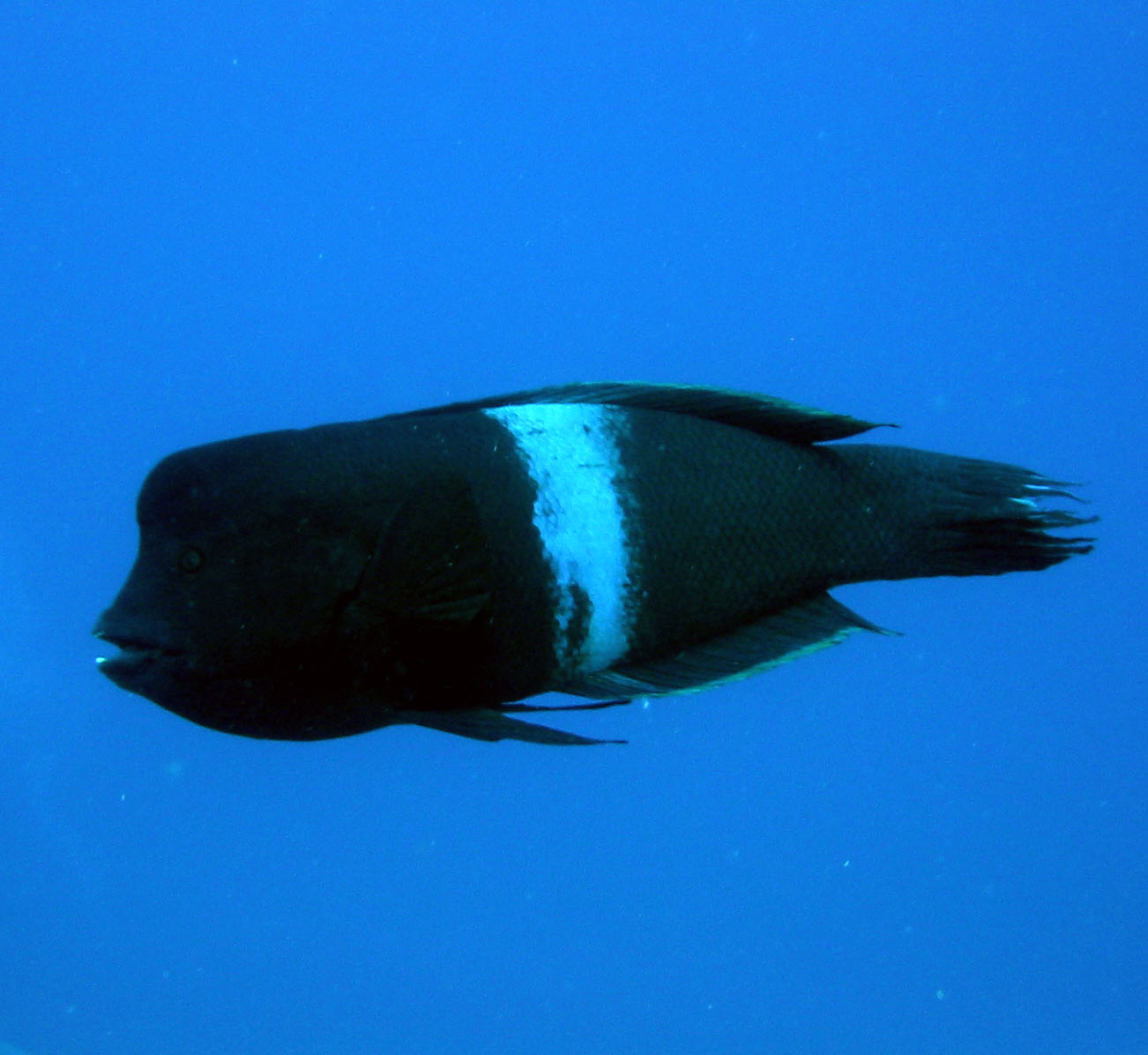
Coris aygula

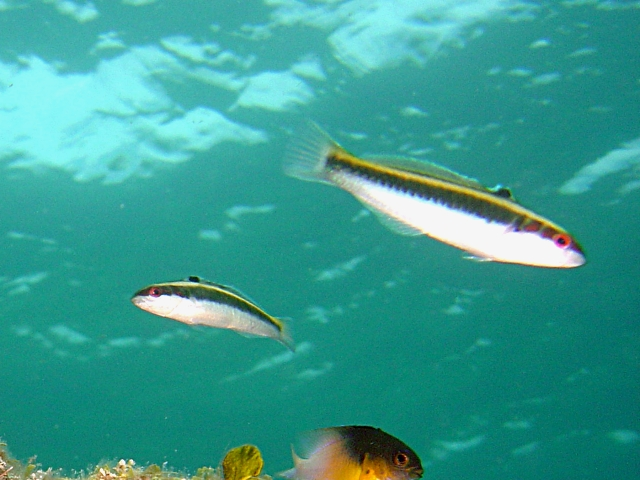
Halichoeres maculipinna
