= Pseudorhabdosynochus mycteropercae =

- Sclerotised parts

Scientific classification
- Kingdom: Animalia
- Phylum: Platyhelminthes
- Class: Monogenea
- Order: Dactylogyridea
- Family: Diplectanidae
- Genus: Pseudorhabdosynochus
- Species: P. mycteropercae

Binomial name
- Pseudorhabdosynochus mycteropercae Kritsky, Bakenhaster & Adams, 2015

Species of flatworm

Pseudorhabdosynochus mycteropercae is a diplectanid monogenean parasitic on the gills of the tiger grouper, Mycteroperca tigris (Serranidae). It has been described by Kritsky, Bakenhaster and Adams in 2015.

== Etymology ==
The specific epithet is derived from the genus of the type-host, Mycteroperca tigris.

== Description ==
Pseudorhabdosynochus mycteropercae is a small monogenean, about 700 μm in length. The species has the general characteristics of other species of Pseudorhabdosynochus, with a flat body and a posterior haptor, which is the organ by which the monogenean attaches itself to the gill of is host. The haptor bears two squamodiscs, one ventral and one dorsal. The sclerotized male copulatory organ, or "quadriloculate organ", has the shape of a bean with four internal chambers, as in other species of Pseudorhabdosynochus. The vagina includes a sclerotized part, which is a complex structure.

== Diagnosis ==
Kritsky, Bakenhaster & Adams (2015) wrote that Pseudorhabdosynochus mycteropercae differs from other members of the group of Pseudorhabdosynochus species infecting Mycteroperca species by having an open chamber of the vaginal sclerite (chamber of P. kritskyi, P. capurroi, P. vascellum, and P. contubernalis is closed; in P. hyphessometochus, the closed anterior wall of the chamber is formed by the two overlapping ends of the chamber wall). In addition, the cavity of the chamber in P. vascellum is small (vs large in P. mycteropercae); the wall of the chamber in P. contubernalis has external projections (absent in P. mycteropercae); the distal portion of the distal tube of the vaginal sclerite is simply recurved in P. kritskyi, P. capurroi, and P. hyphessometochus (vs distal tube doubly recurved in P. mycteropercae).

== Hosts and localities ==
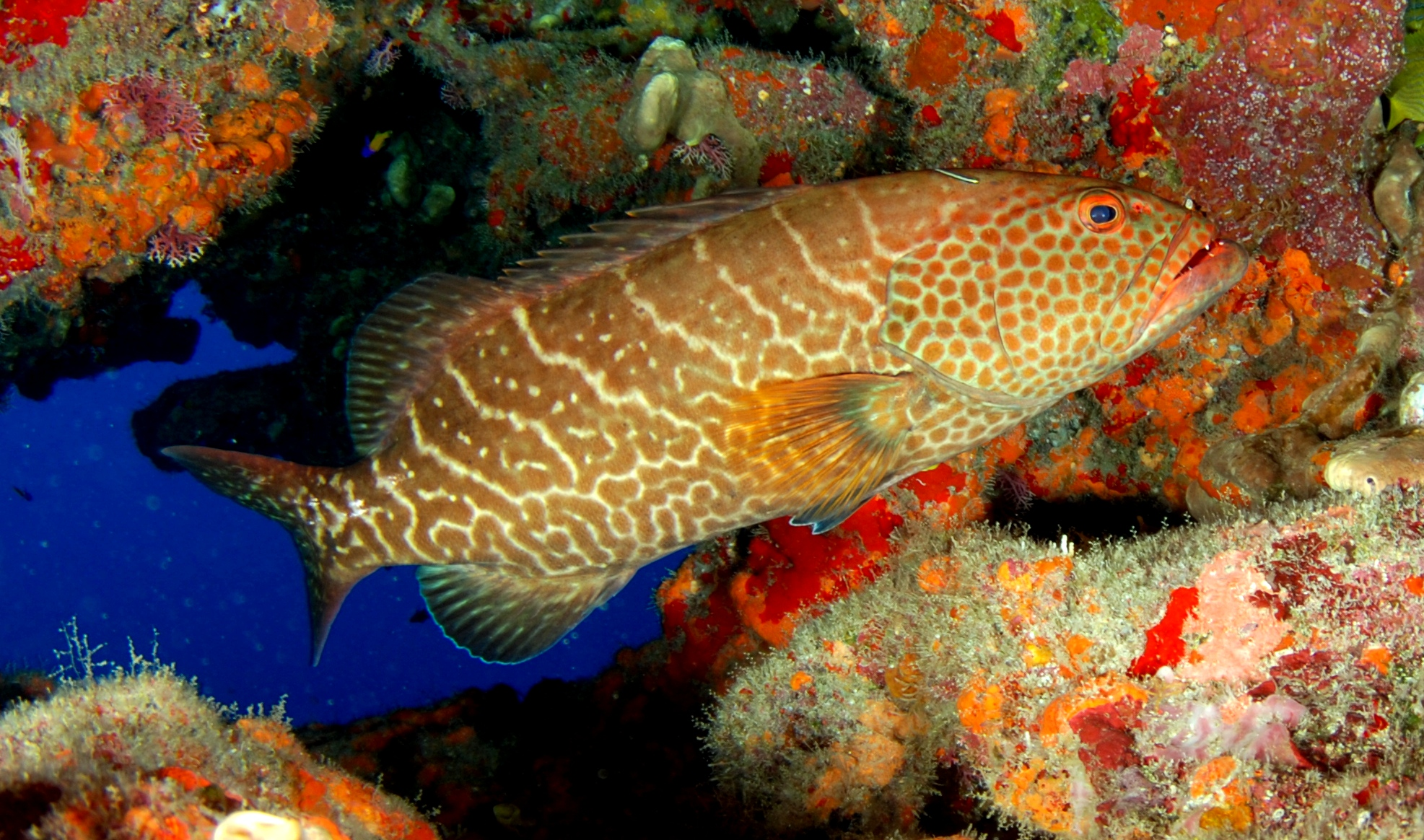
The tiger grouper, Mycteroperca tigris is the type-host of Pseudorhabdosynochus mycteropercae

The type-host and only recorded host of Pseudorhabdosynochus mycteropercae is the tiger grouper, Mycteroperca tigris (Serranidae: Epinephelinae). The type-locality is 8 miles north-west of St. George’s Island, Bermuda.
