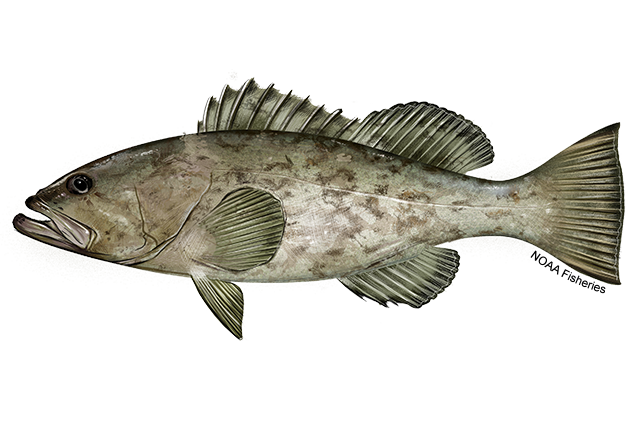

Conservation status
- Vulnerable (IUCN 3.1)

Scientific classification
- Kingdom: Animalia
- Phylum: Chordata
- Class: Actinopterygii
- Order: Perciformes
- Family: Epinephelidae
- Genus: Mycteroperca
- Species: M. microlepis

Binomial name
- Mycteroperca microlepis Goode and Bean, 1879

Synonyms
- Trisotropis microlepis Goode & Bean, 1879

= Mycteroperca microlepis =

Species of fish

The gag grouper (Mycteroperca microlepis), also known as velvet rockfish, the gag, or charcoal belly, is a species of marine ray-finned fish, a grouper from the subfamily Epinephelinae which is part of the family Serranidae, which also includes the anthias and sea basses. It comes from warmer parts of the West Atlantic, including the Caribbean and Gulf of Mexico. It is a drab, mottled-gray fish lacking the distinguishing features of most other groupers. Its pattern of markings resemble the box-shaped spots of the black grouper (Mycteroperca bonaci). It lacks the streamer-points on the tail fin that scamp (M. phenax) and yellowmouth grouper (M. interstitialis) have and lacks yellow coloration around the mouth.

== Description ==
The gag grouper has an oblong, robust body which is laterally compressed. The depth of the body is normally less than the length of the head and it is usually roughly equal in depth at the origin of the dorsal fin and at the anal fin origin. The standard length is three to three and a half times the depth of the body. The dorsal profile of the head is convex and the preopercle has a rounded lobe at its angle which has enlarged serrations. The dorsal fin contains 11 spines and 16 to 18 soft rays while the anal fin contains 3 spines and 10 to 12 soft rays. The membranes between the dorsal fin spines are notched with the third and fourth spines being the longest. The caudal fin is square. The adult females and the juveniles are normally pale grey to brown-grey marked with darker blotches and wavy lines that give a marbled appearance to the upper flanks and back. The pelvic, anal and caudal fins have bluish-black margins. When resting they often assume a camouflage pattern with 5 dark brown saddles separated by white bars along the base of the dorsal fin. The large adult males are typically pale to medium grey in colour, with an indistinct reticulated pattern underneath the dorsal fin. They are darker grey or black on the breast and belly, with a similar colour on the margins of the soft rayed part of the dorsal find the caudal fin, as well as the posterior margins of the pectoral and pelvic fins. There is also a colour phase called "black-back" which has the rear end of the body and all of the soft rayed part of the dorsal fin and the anal fin are black. This species attains a maximum total length of 145 centimetres (57 in) although 50 centimetres (20 in) is a more common length, and the maximum published weight attained is 36.5 kilograms (80 lb).

== Distribution ==
The gag grouper is found in the western Atlantic Ocean where it has a disjunct distribution. The northern population is found around Bermuda and along the eastern coast of the United States from North Carolina south to Yucatan Peninsula of Mexico but it is largely absent from Cuba, apart from one record of a vagrant. The southern population is found in southern Brazil from Rio de Janeiro State to Santa Catarina State. Juveniles have been recorded in as far north as Massachusetts.

== Habitat and biology ==
Mycteroperca microlepis has different habitat preferences as a juvenile and as an adult. The juveniles are found in estuaries and beds of sea grass while the adults are found farther offshore over rocky substrates at depths of 40 to 10 metres (131 to 33 ft) and have been recorded as deep as 152 metres (499 ft). Adults are occasionally recorded inshore over rock sea beds or sea grass beds. It is one of the commonest species of grouper on the eastern Gulf of Mexico. They can be found both in brackish and marine waters. The adults can be found either in groups of 5–50 fish or as solitary fish. They have been recorded producing thumping sounds when under stress, this is done by vibrating the swim bladder using muscular contractions. The adults are predators on fishes (including smaller conspecifics), crabs, shrimps, and cephalopods while the smaller juveniles prey on crustaceans within the beds of sea grass in shallow waters. The fishes preyed upon are largely herring, sea bream, jacks and pompanos, drums and grey mullet.

This species is a protogynous hermaphrodite; all fish start life as females, attaining sexual maturity between the ages of 5 and 6 years old and having reached a total length of 67 to 75 centimetres (26 to 30 in), they will spawn at least once and then some will change sex and become males. In the offshore waters between North Carolina and Florida, between 1976 and 1982, the sex ratio was found to favour females, with 84% of the population being female, 15% being male and 1% in the process of sex change. However, a subsequent study discovered that proportion of males had decreased to around 5.5%, fishing pressures which are concentrated on large males being the probable cause of this result. Although the sex change can occur as early as 5 years old it is more typical for it to take place at 10 to 11 years old and at a total length between 95 and 100 centimetres (37 and 39 in). In the Atlantic coastal waters between North Carolina and Florida there are annual migrations in late winter; these migrations involve sexually mature fishes moving to offshore spawning grounds where at depths of 70 metres (230 ft). The spawning season in this region runs from December through May, peaking in late March and early April. In the eastern Gulf of Mexico, the spawning season runs from late December through to April, peaking in February and April. After spawning the females move towards shallower waters with depths less than 30 metres (98 ft), while the males prefer waters of 50 to 90 metres (160 to 300 ft) They maximum recorded age is 31 years.

== Taxonomy ==
Mycteroperca microlepis was first formally described as Trisotropis microlepis in 1879 by the American ichthyologists George Brown Goode (1851–1896) and Tarleton Hoffman Bean (1846–1916) with the type locality given as Florida.

== Utilisation and threats ==
The gag grouper is targeted by commercial and recreational fisheries using handline, bottom longline and speargun. Fishermen target the spawning aggregation while the juveniles are frequently caught as bycatch in the bait-shrimp fishery that fishes over sea grass beds. There have been reports of ciguatera poisoning among humans following the consumption of flesh from M. microlepis. This species is threatened by and is vulnerable to overfishing and both Mexico and the United States have introduced conservation measures.
