= Pseudorhabdosynochus kritskyi =

- Body and sclerotised parts

Scientific classification
- Kingdom: Animalia
- Phylum: Platyhelminthes
- Class: Monogenea
- Order: Dactylogyridea
- Family: Diplectanidae
- Genus: Pseudorhabdosynochus
- Species: P. kritskyi

Binomial name
- Pseudorhabdosynochus kritskyi Dyer, Williams & Bunkley-Williams, 1995

Species of flatworm

Pseudorhabdosynochus kritskyi is a diplectanid monogenean parasitic on the gills of the gag, Mycteroperca microlepis. The species has been described by Dyer, Williams and Bunkley-Williams in 1995 and redescribed successively by Yang, Gibson and Zeng in 2005 and by Kritsky, Bakenhaster and Adams in 2015. The name of the species honours the American parasitologist Delane C. Kritsky.

== Description ==
Pseudorhabdosynochus kritskyi is a small monogenean, less than 1 mm (700 μm) long. The species has the general characteristics of other species of Pseudorhabdosynochus, with a flat body and a posterior haptor, which is the organ by which the monogenean attaches itself to the gill of is host. The haptor bears two squamodiscs, one ventral and one dorsal. The sclerotized male copulatory organ, or "quadriloculate organ", has the shape of a bean with four internal chambers, as in other species of Pseudorhabdosynochus. The vagina includes a sclerotized part, which is a complex structure.

The redescription by Kritsky, Bakenhaster & Adams in 2015 includes the following: Body dorsoventrally flattened. Tegument smooth, scales absent. Cephalic region broad, with two terminal and two bilateral poorly developed lobes, three bilateral pairs of head organs, pair of bilateral groups of cephalic-gland cells at level of pharynx. Four eyespots immediately anterior to pharynx, lacking lenses; members of posterior pair slightly larger, closer together than those of anterior pair; accessory chromatic granules small, irregular in outline, usually absent in cephalic region. Pharynx ovate, muscular; esophagus short to nonexistent; intestinal ceca blind, extending posteriorly to peduncle, diverging posterior to testis. Peduncle broad. Haptor subtriangular, with dorsal and ventral anteromedial lobes containing respective squamodiscs and lateral lobes having hook pairs 2–4, 6, 7. Squamodiscs subequal, with 14 or 15 U-shaped rows of rodlets; three or four innermost rows oval, closed. Ventral anchor with elongate superficial root, long deep root having lateral swelling, slightly curved shaft, and short recurved point extending just short of level of tip of superficial root. Dorsal anchor with subtriangular base, superficial root short to lacking, moderately long deep root, slightly arcing shaft, recurved point extending past level of tip of superficial root. Ventral bar with medial constriction, tapered ends, longitudinal medioventral groove. Paired dorsal bar with enlarged medial end. Hook with elongate slightly depressed thumb, delicate point, uniform shank; FH loop nearly shank length. Testis subspherical, usually with indentation of posterior margin suggesting two posterior lobes; proximal vas deferens dorsoventrally looping left intestinal cecum; seminal vesicle a simple dilation of distal portion of vas deferens, lying just posterior to male copulatory organ; vas deferens entering large subspherical ejaculatory bulb; ejaculatory duct entering portal to male copulatory organ; large vesicle (prostatic reservoir?) lying to right of male copulatory organ. Male copulatory organ reniform, quadriloculate, with short tapered cone, elongate distal tube, and variable apparently retractile filament (usually not observed); walls of two distal chambers thick, walls of chambers becoming thinner proximally. Germarium pyriform; germarial bulb dextral, lying diagonally at body midlength, with elongate dorsoventral loop around right intestinal cecum; ootype lying to left of body midline; Mehlis' gland not observed; uterus delicate, banana shaped when empty. Common genital pore ventral, dextral to MCO. Vaginal pore sinistroventral at level of seminal vesicle; vagina with distal vestibule; vaginal sclerite having sclerotized tube with distal recurved and funnel-shaped terminus opening into vestibule; single chamber usually spherical, with thick wall; proximal vaginal canal delicate, leading to seminal receptacle. Seminal receptacle near body midline. Bilateral vitelline ducts at level of origin of uterus; vitellarium absent in regions of other reproductive organs, otherwise dense throughout trunk. Measurements: Body 733 μm long; width at level of germarium 221 μm. Haptor 187 μm wide; squamodisc 62 μm long, 81 μm wide. Ventral anchor 40 μm long; dorsal anchor 38 μm long. Ventral bar 78 μm long; dorsal bar 50 μm long. Hook 12 μm long. Pharynx 54 μm wide. Male copulatory organ 114 μm long. Testis 91 μm long, 137 μm wide. Germarial bulb 60 μm wide.

== Diagnosis ==
According to Kritsky, Bakenhaster & Adams (2015), Pseudorhabdosynochus kritskyi differs from P. vascellum and P. hyphessometochus by having a large cavity within the chamber of the vaginal sclerite and from P. vascellum and P. contubernalis by having a short heavy cone of the male copulatory organ. It is distinguished from P. mycteropercae by having comparatively short dorsal and ventral anchor shafts and a dorsal bar with an enlarged medial end . It differs further from these species by having more rows of rodlets in the haptoral squamodiscs.

== Hosts and localities ==
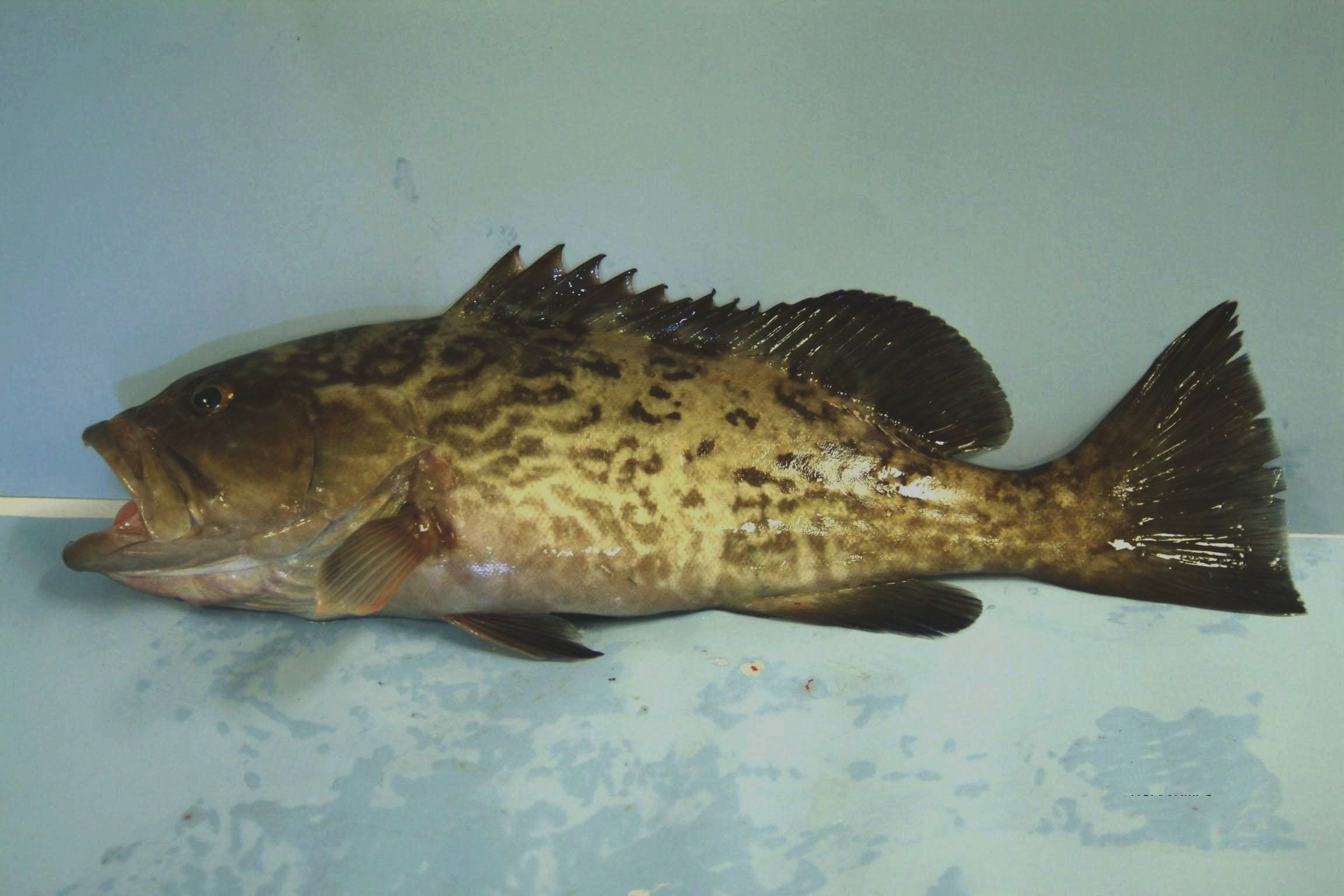
The gag, Mycteroperca microlepis is the type-host of Pseudorhabdosynochus kritskyi

The type-host and only host of Pseudorhabdosynochus kritskyi is the gag, Mycteroperca microlepis and the type-locality is the Gulf of Mexico. Other records include Florida Middle Grounds in the Gulf of Mexico, near Mobile Bay, Alabama, and Tampa Bay, Florida.
