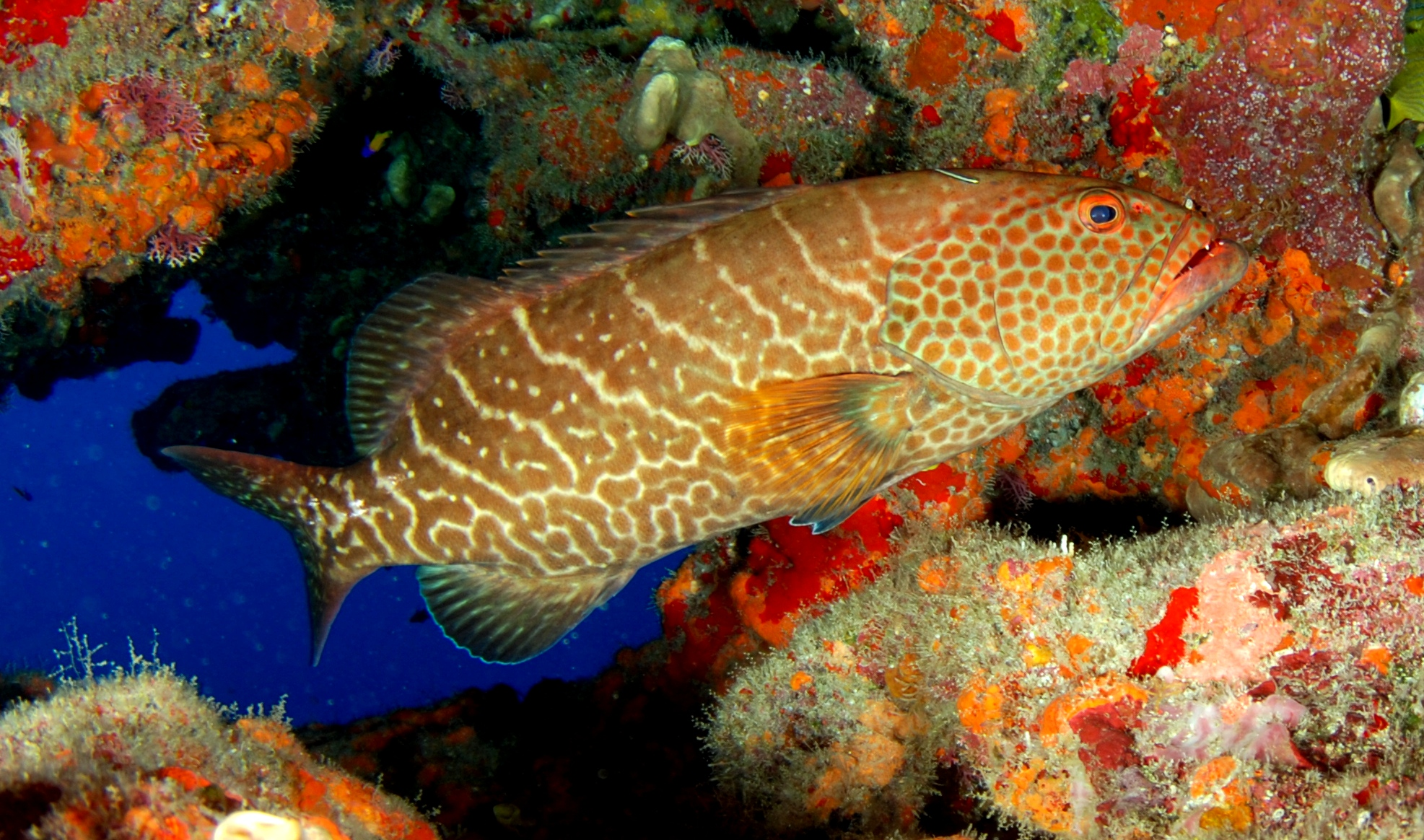

Conservation status
- Data Deficient (IUCN 3.1)

Scientific classification
- Kingdom: Animalia
- Phylum: Chordata
- Class: Actinopterygii
- Order: Perciformes
- Family: Epinephelidae
- Genus: Mycteroperca
- Species: M. tigris

Binomial name
- Mycteroperca tigris (Valenciennes, 1833)

Synonyms
- List: Serranus tigris Valenciennes, 1833; Serranus camelopardalis Poey, 1860; Serranus felinus Poey, 1860; Serranus repandus Poey, 1860; Serranus rivulatus Poey, 1860; Trisotropis reticulatus Gill, 1865; Mycteroperca hopkinsi Jordan & Rutter, 1897

= Tiger grouper =

Species of fish

The tiger grouper (Mycteroperca tigris) is a species of marine ray-finned fish, a grouper from the subfamily Epinephelinae which is part of the family Serranidae, which also includes the anthias and sea basses. It is found in the warmer waters of the western Atlantic Ocean.

== Description ==
The tiger grouper has a body which is elongate, robust and compressed, its depth being the no greater at the origin of the dorsal fin as it is at the origin of the anal fin, and a large mouth. The standard length is 3.1 to 3.6 times the depth of the body. The preopercle is rounded and does not have a lobe at its angle. The dorsal fin contains 11 spines and 15-17 soft rays while the anal fin contains 3 spines and 11 soft rays. The membranes between the dorsal fin spines are obviously notched. The caudal fin is a straight in juveniles and slightly concave in adults. The upper body is dark and there are 9 to 11 thin, pale oblique lines. It is capable of dramatic changes in colour, as well as lightening or darkening its colour. It can even sometimes be bright red in colour, particularly when being attended to by cleaner fish. The juveniles are yellow with a dusky line along the flanks. This species attains a total length of 101 centimetres (40 in), although they are commonly around 40 centimetres (16 in), and a maximum published weight of 10 kilograms (22 lb).

Males have dark pectoral fins while females have orange pectoral fins.

== Distribution ==
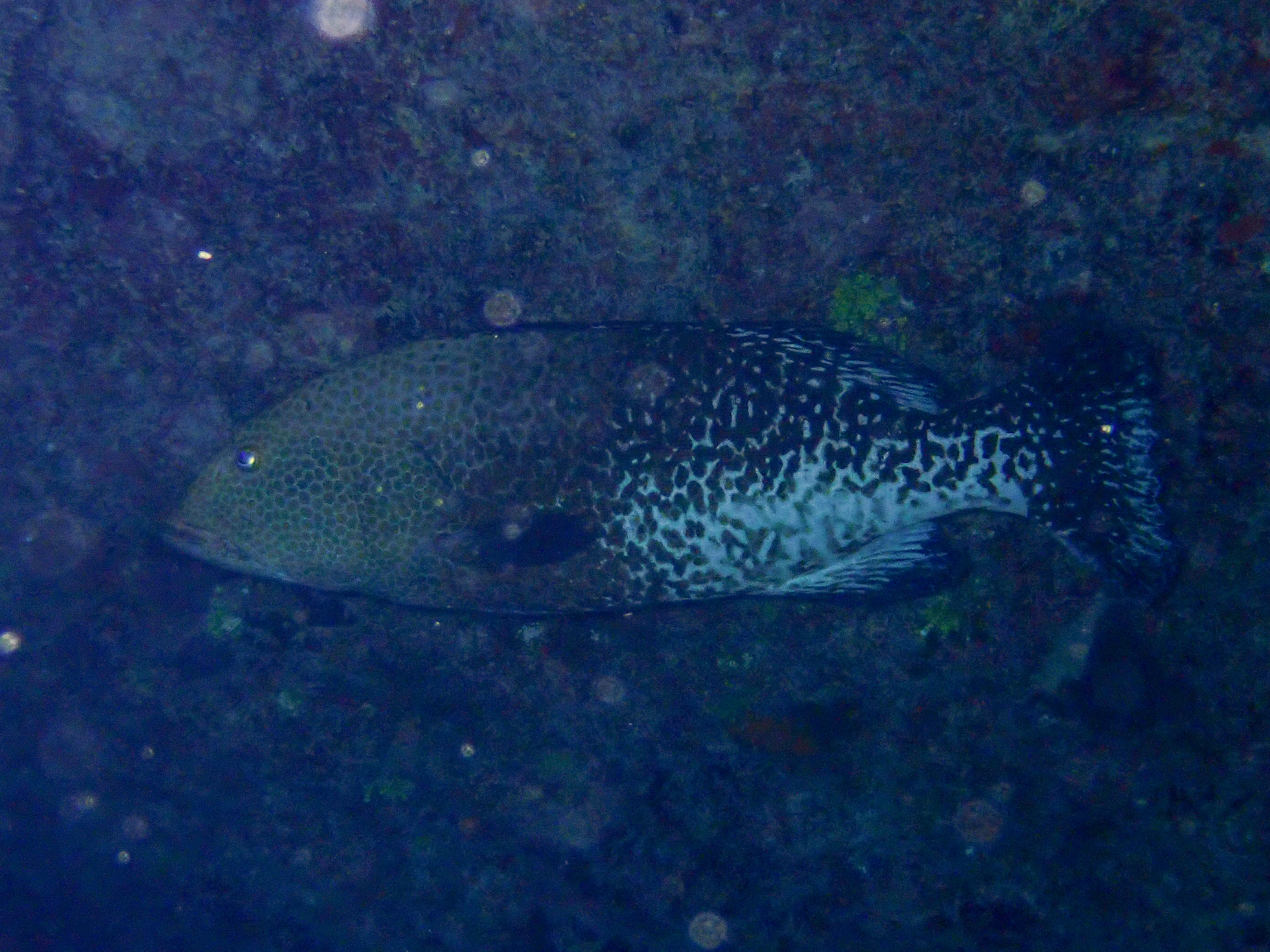
Male, in the Cayman Islands

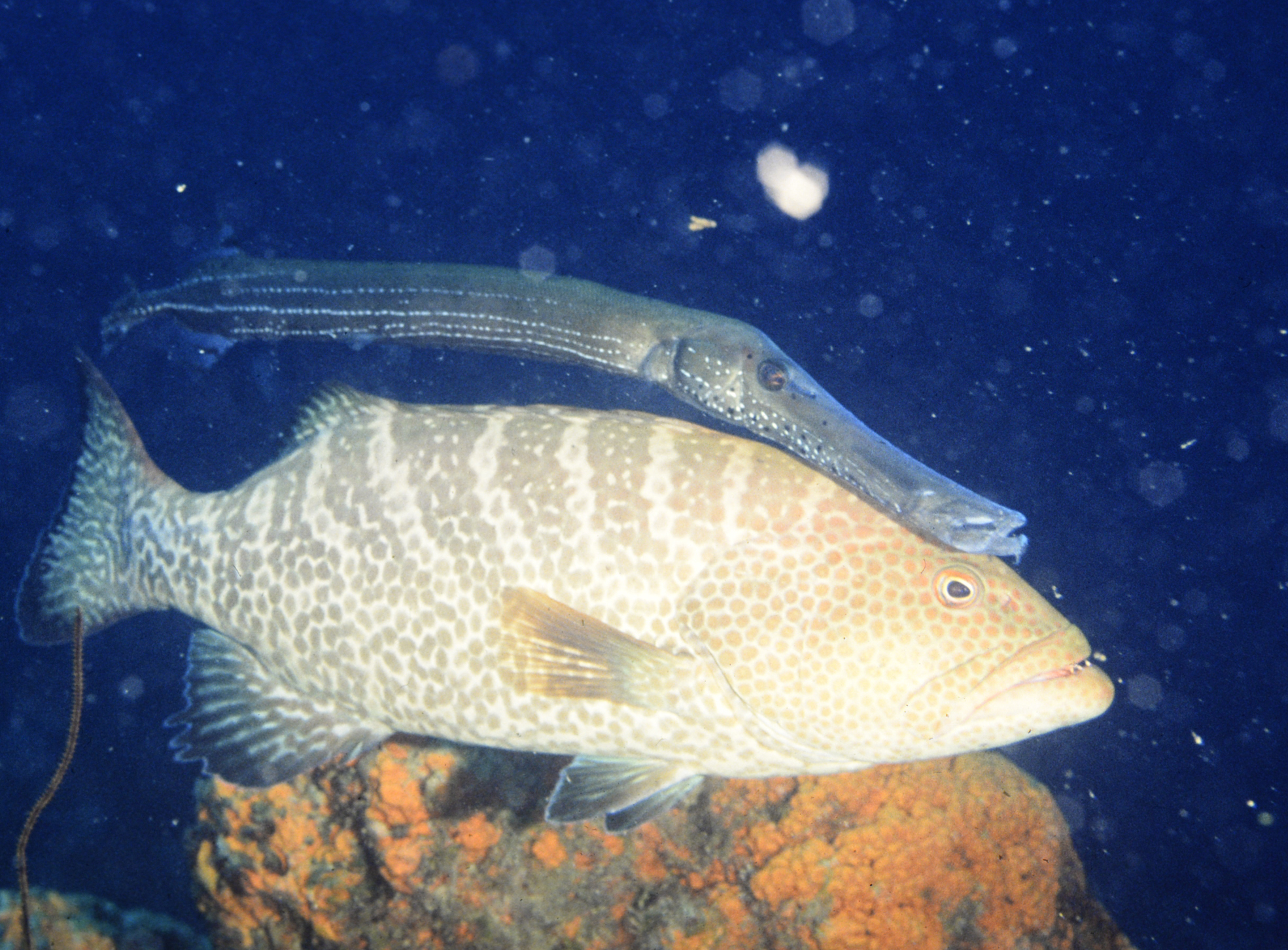
Female, with a West Atlantic trumpetfish

The tiger grouper is found in the western Atlantic Ocean from southeastern Florida, Bermuda and the Bahamas, as well as the Flower Garden Banks in the north, southwards through the Caribbean Sea to the Maroni River in French Guiana. A disjunct population occurs in Brazil where they are found from Ceara State to Rio de Janeiro State.

== Habitat and biology ==
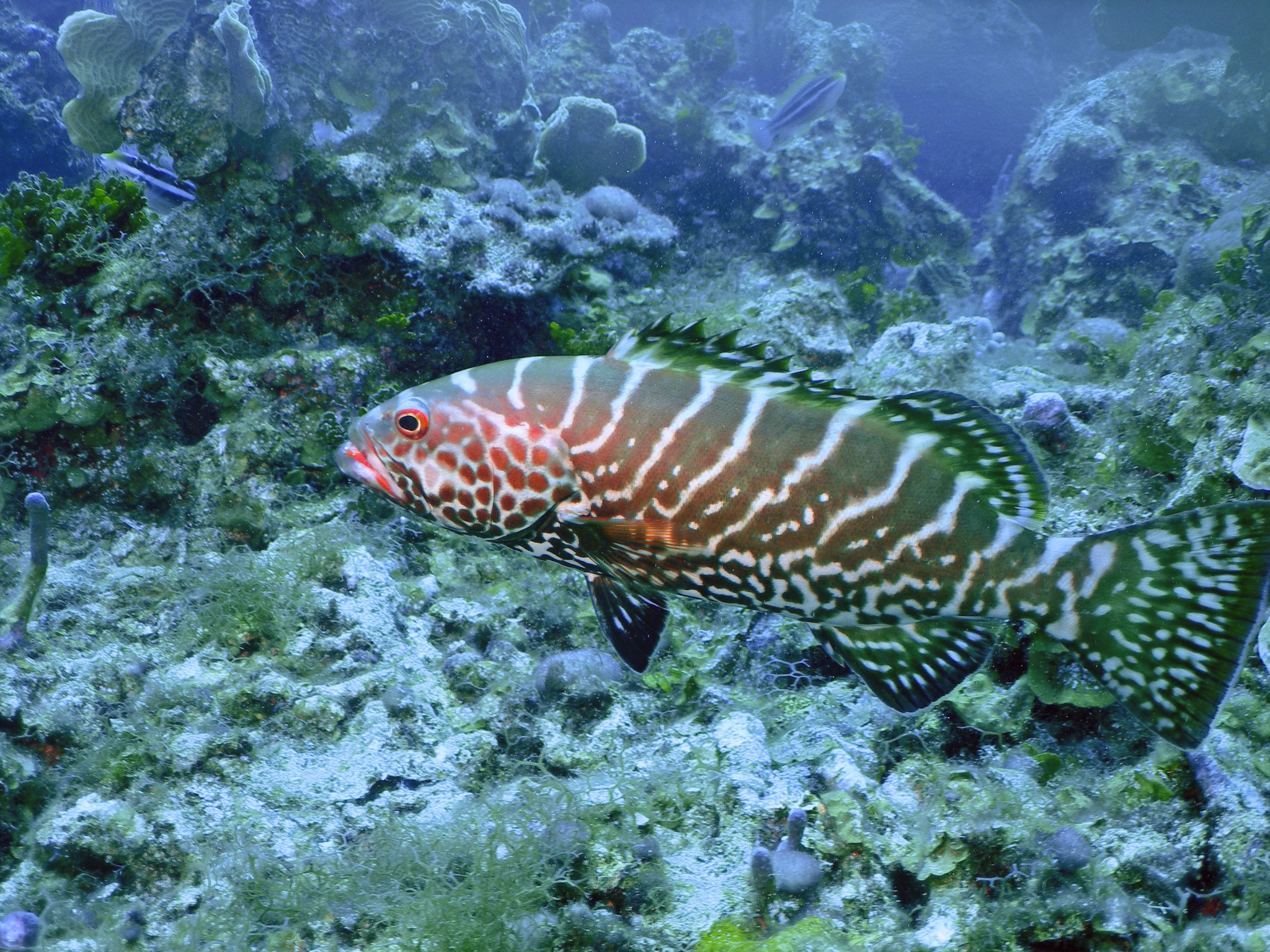
Juvenile, in the Cayman Islands

The tiger grouper is a solitary species which is found on coral reefs and in rocky areas. It is an ambush predator of smaller fishes. It hides among coral and sponges and is attempts to remain concealed, even when approached. It attaneds the cleaning stations of cleaner fish. The population around Bermuda has a size distribution and sex ratio which suggest that tiger groupers are protogynous hermaphrodites, all of the fish with a total length less than 37 centimetres (15 in) were female and all of the fish with a total length greater than 45 centimetres (18 in) were male. They are found at depths of 3 to 112 metres (9.8 to 367.5 ft). It is known to form spawning aggregations in the northern part of its range but these have not been recorded off Brazil.

== Taxonomy ==
The tiger grouper was first formally described as Serranus tigris in 1833 by the French zoologist Achille Valenciennes (1794–1865) with the type locality given as San Domingo.

== Utilisation ==
The tiger grouper is targeted by fisheries throughout its range. It is caught using handlines and by spear fishing.
