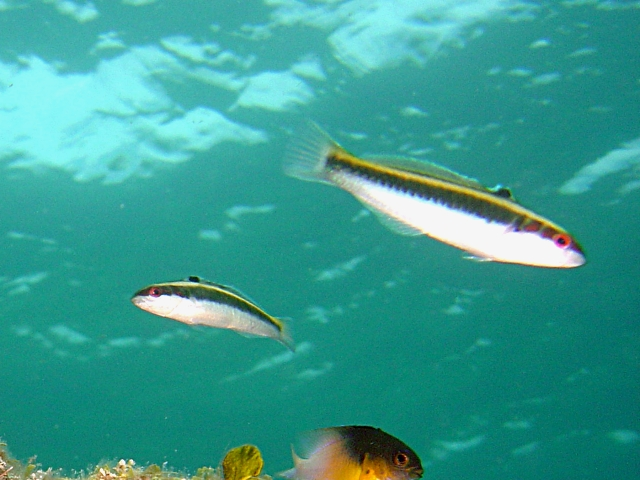

Conservation status
- Least Concern (IUCN 3.1)

Scientific classification
- Kingdom: Animalia
- Phylum: Chordata
- Class: Actinopterygii
- Division: Teleostei
- Order: Labriformes
- Family: Labridae
- Genus: Halichoeres
- Species: H. maculipinna

Binomial name
- Halichoeres maculipinna (J. P. Müller & Troschel, 1848)

Synonyms
- Julis maculipinna Müller & Troschel, 1848

= Halichoeres maculipinna =

Species of fish

Halichoeres maculipinna, the clown wrasse, is a species of tropical fish that lives throughout the Caribbean Sea and adjacent parts of the western Atlantic Ocean. It is a carnivorous, multi-colored wrasse that is common throughout its range.

== Description ==
Halichoeres maculipinna is generally less than 120 millimetres (4.7 in) long. The fish is slightly elongated with a nearly symmetrical upper and lower body. It has a pointed snout and rows of small teeth in its upper and lower jaws with two sets of canines in each (at the front and corners of its mouth). Its pectoral fin has fourteen rays, its dorsal fin has eleven rays and nine spines, and its anal fin has eleven rays and three spines.

Its dorsal side is yellow and is separated from its white ventral side by a black band. It has three red lines across the top of its head, and it may have a dark spot on its dorsal fin.

== Habitat ==
The fish lives in the northwestern Atlantic Ocean. Its range extends from the state of North Carolina in the United States, to the island of Bermuda and as far south as Colombia. It is also found in Caribbean islands such as Cuba and the Cayman Islands as well as Central American countries such as Belize. The fish was once believed to live in Brazil, but a study conducted by Luiz A. Rocha in 2004 demonstrated that Brazilian populations belonged to a different species, Halichoeres penrosei.

Halichoeres maculipinna lives on the tops of coral reefs and in rocky areas. The fish is generally found 1 to 30 metres (3 to 100 ft) beneath the surface. It has also been reported to live within Venezuelan Sargassum beds.

== Behavior ==
=== Diet ===
The fish is a carnivore. It primarily consumes invertebrates and ray-finned fish.

=== Reproduction ===
Like many other wrasses, the fish is a sequential hermaphrodite. It can change its sex from male to female. It mates through lek mating. During this process, males are noted to be particularly territorial. Reproduction occurs through spawning.

== Conservation status ==
While a quantitative assessment of the population of Halichoeres maculipinna has not been performed, it is widespread and fairly common throughout its range. The species faces no major threats beyond occasional collection for the aquarium trade.
