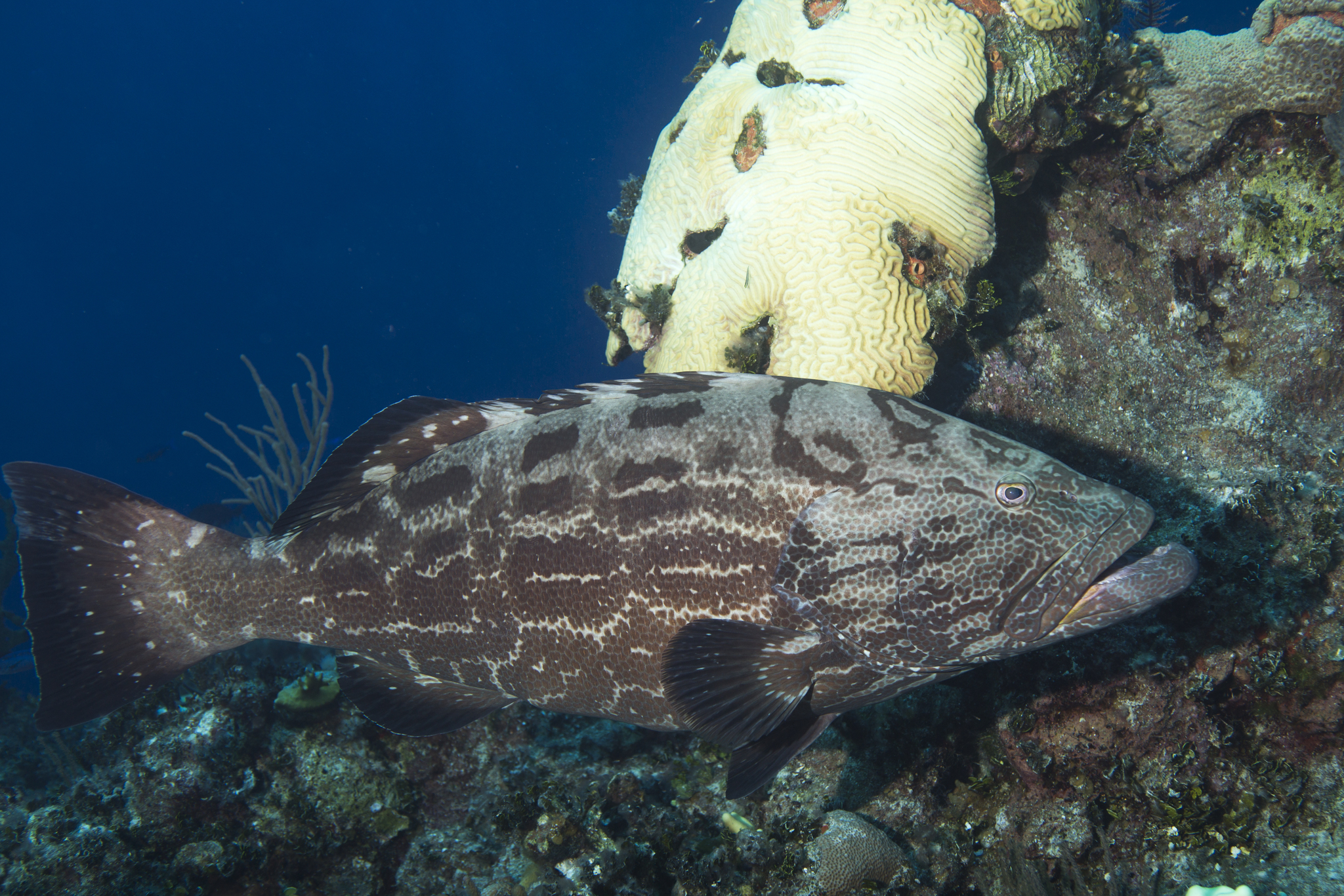
- In the Bahamas

Conservation status
- Near Threatened (IUCN 3.1)

Scientific classification
- Kingdom: Animalia
- Phylum: Chordata
- Class: Actinopterygii
- Division: Teleostei
- Order: Perciformes
- Family: Epinephelidae
- Genus: Mycteroperca
- Species: M. bonaci

Binomial name
- Mycteroperca bonaci Poey, 1860

Synonyms
- List: Bonaci arara Parra, 1787; Serranus bonaci Poey, 1860; Serranus brunneus Poey, 1860; Serranus decimalis Poey, 1860; Serranus arara Storer, 1860; Serranus cyclopomatus Poey, 1861; Serranus latepictus Poey, 1861; Trisotropis aguaji Poey, 1867; Mycteroperca bonaci var. xanthosticta Jordan & Swain, 1885

= Mycteroperca bonaci =

Species of fish

Mycteroperca bonaci, the black grouper, black rockfish or marbled rockfish, is a species of marine ray-finned fish, a grouper from the subfamily Epinephelinae which is part of the family Serranidae, which also includes the anthias and sea basses. Other fish are sometimes called the black grouper including the similar gag grouper (Mycteroperca microlepis), the misty grouper (Hyporthodus mystacinus), and the warsaw grouper (Hyporthodus nigritus). This species is found in the western Atlantic Ocean from the northeastern United States to Brazil.

== Taxonomy ==
Mycteroperca bonaci was first formally described as Serranus bonaci in 1860 by the Cuban zoologist Felipe Poey (1799-1891) with Cuba being given as the type locality.

== Distribution ==
Mycteroperca bonaci is found in the western Atlantic where its range extends from Cape Canaveral in Florida and Bermuda south to the Bahamas, into the Gulf of Mexico as far north as Alabama and from southern Texas along the coast of Mexico and Cuba. It occurs throughout the Caribbean Sea, along the coast of South America to Santa Catarina in Brazil. Its range extends to the Brazilian islands of Trindade and Fernando de Noronha. There is a gap in its distribution along the northern coast of South America between Paramaribo in Suriname and Maranhão in Brazil. Occurrences in United States waters north to Massachusetts are juveniles and therefore considered vagrants.

== Description ==
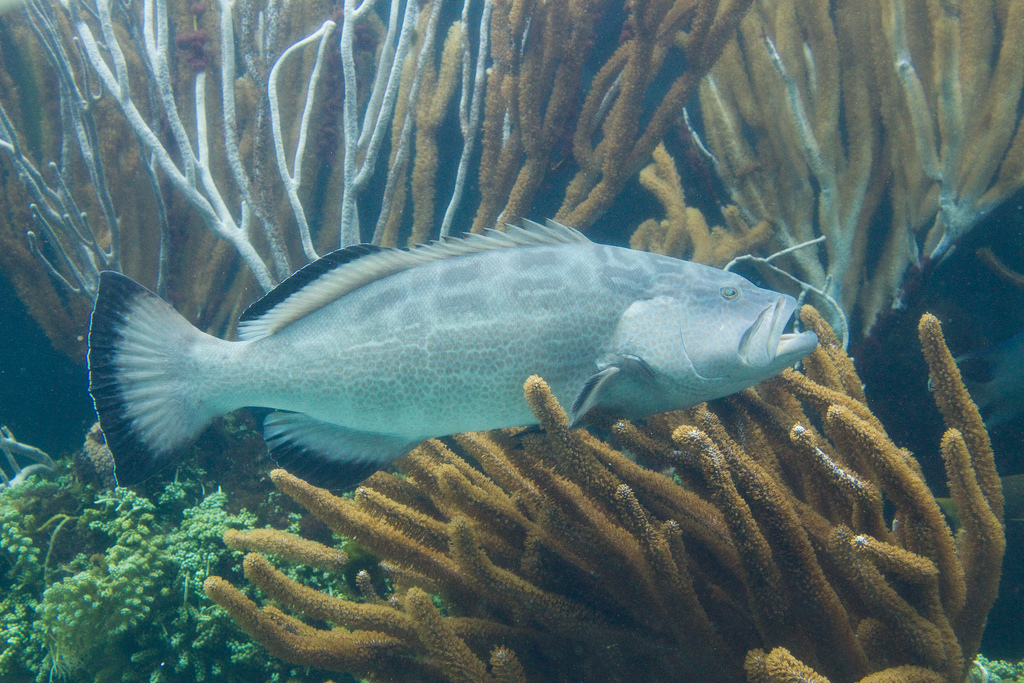
In Bermuda

This fish attains a maximum total length of 150 centimetres (59 in), although they are more common at around 70 centimetres (28 in) and a maximum published weight of 100 kilograms (220 lb). Myctoperca bonaci has an oblong, laterally compressed body with a standard length which is 3.3 to 3.5 times its depth. It has an evenly rounded preopercle with no incisions or lobes at its angle. The dorsal fin contains 11 spines and 15-17 soft rays while the anal fin has 3 spines and 11-13 soft rays, both fins having rounded margins. The caudal fin is truncate to emarginate, although it may be convex if spread widely.

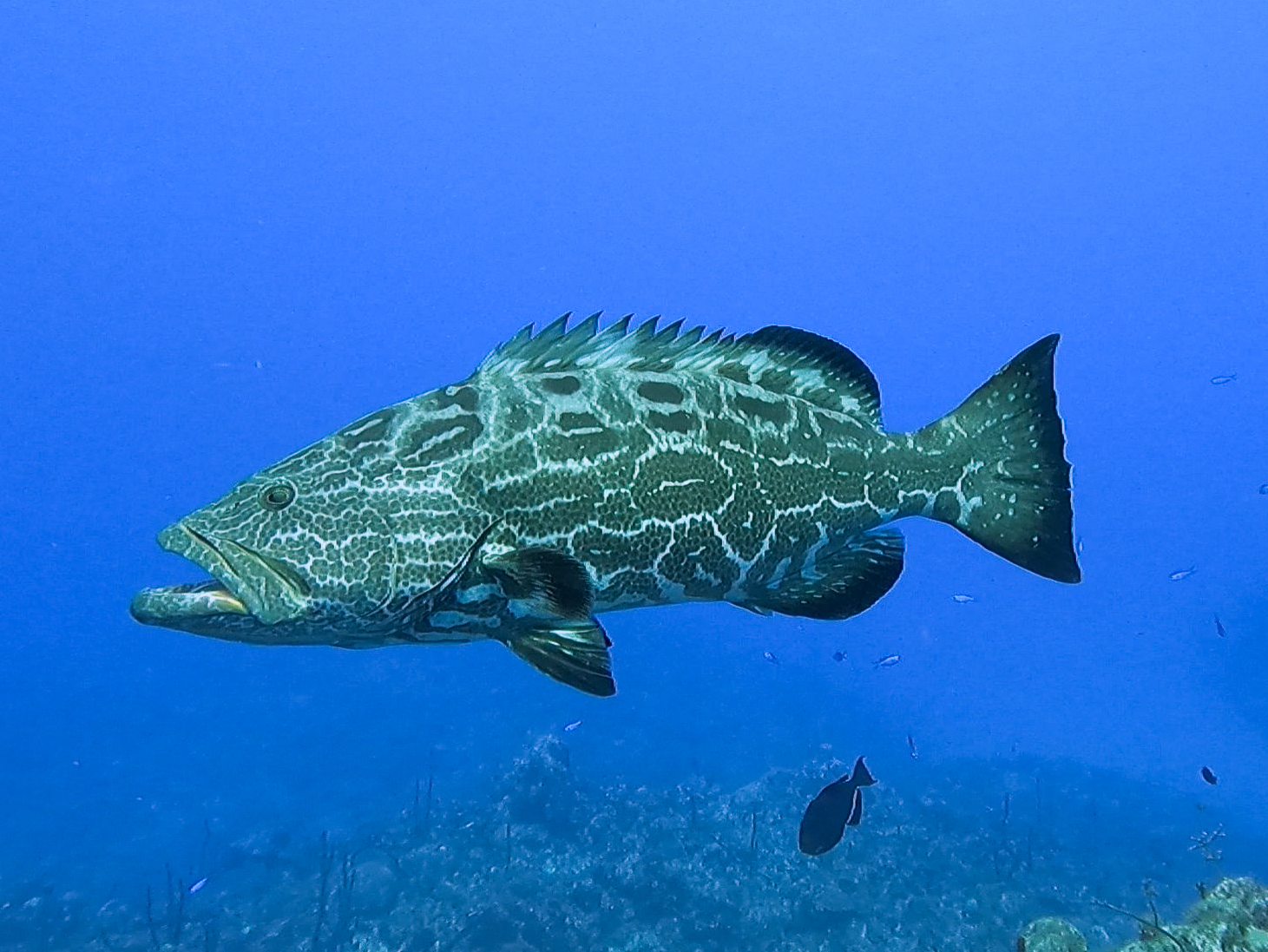
In the Cayman Islands

This species has an overall olive grey colour and is marked with dark blotches and brassy hexagonal spots over the head and flanks. The pectoral fins are sooty brown, fading to orange towards the margin; the soft rayed part of the dorsal fin and the anal fin, as well as the forward edge of the pelvic fin have a dark margin.

== Habitat and biology ==
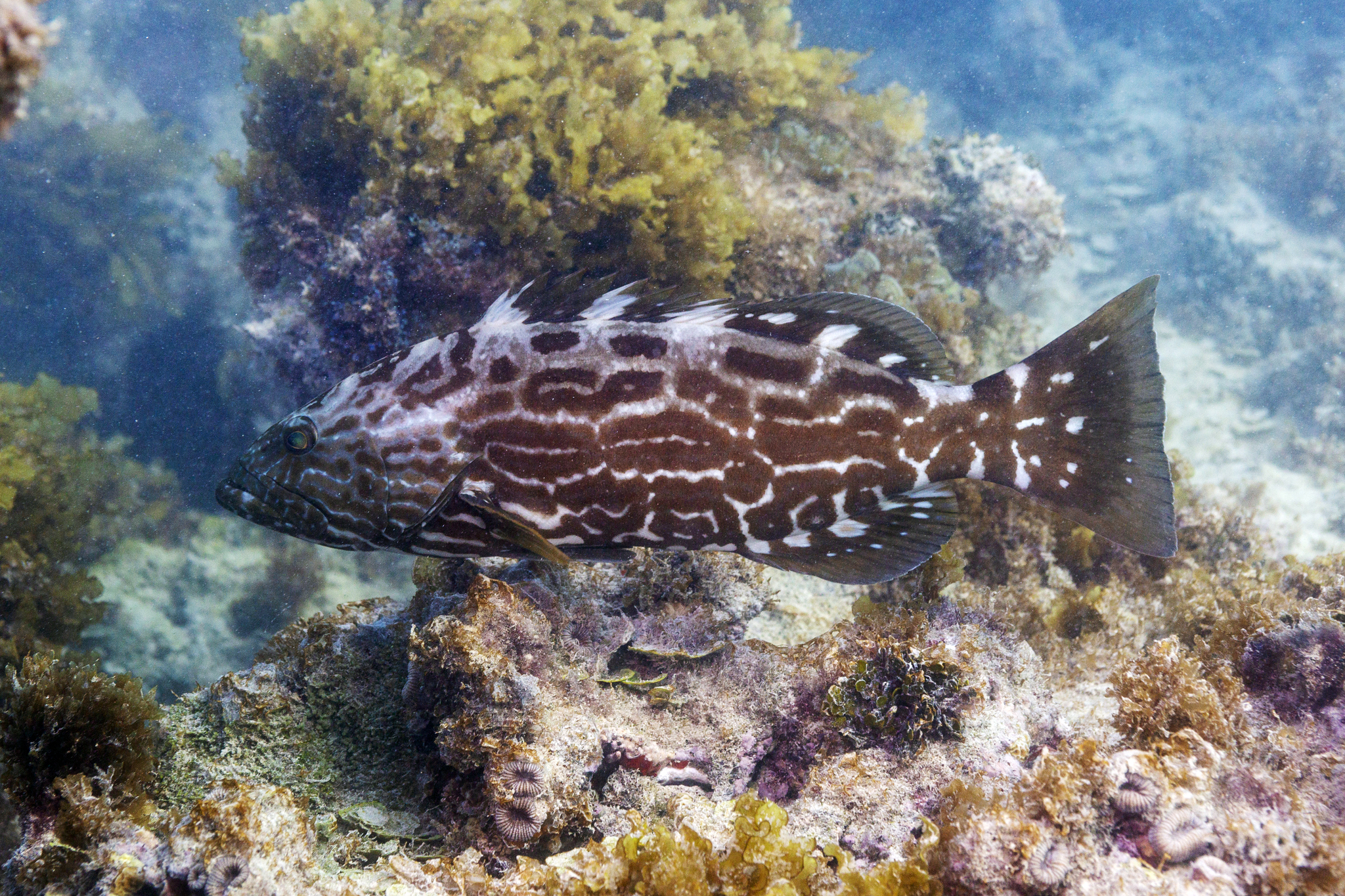
In Brazil

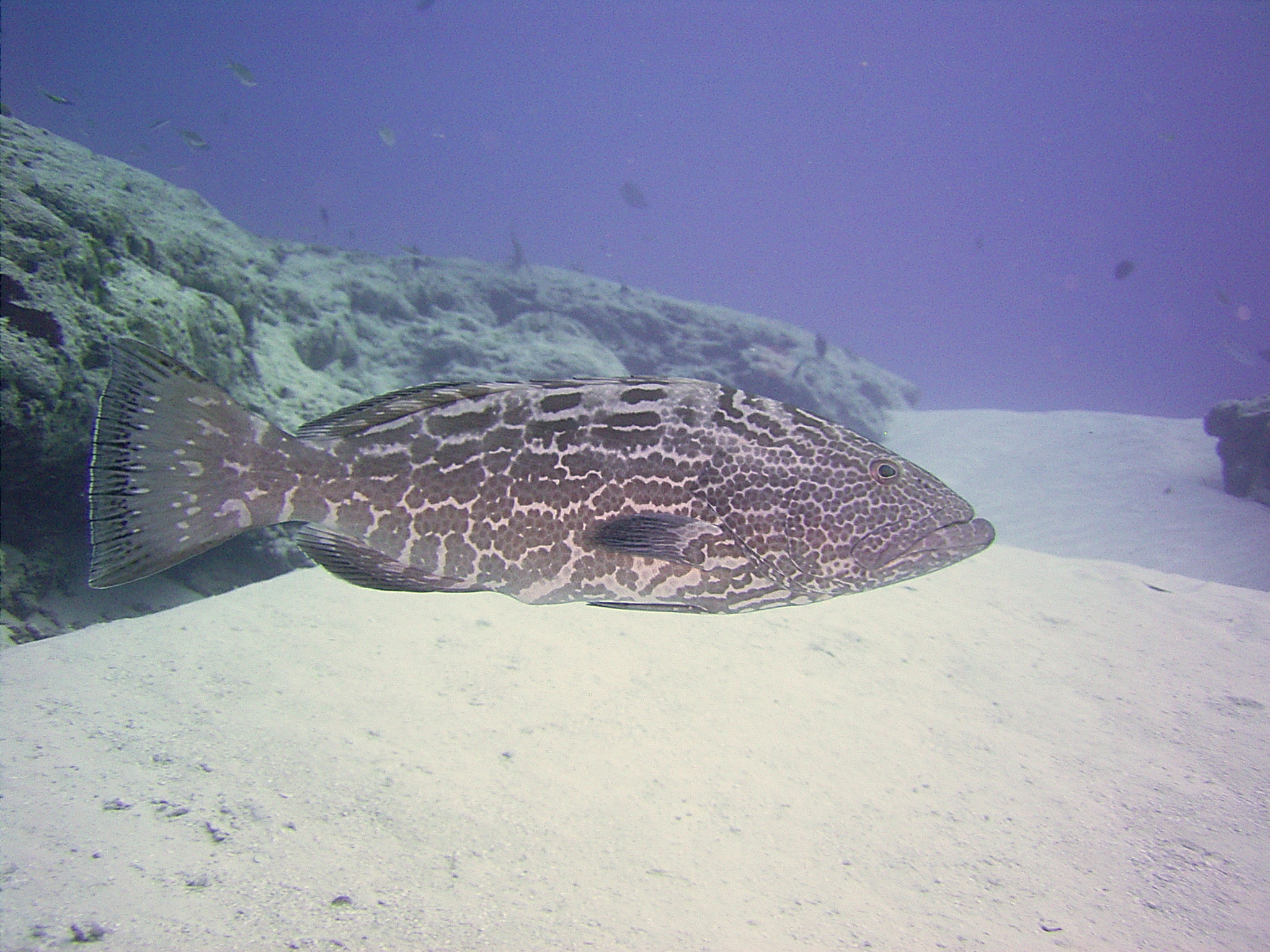
In Quintana Roo, Mexico

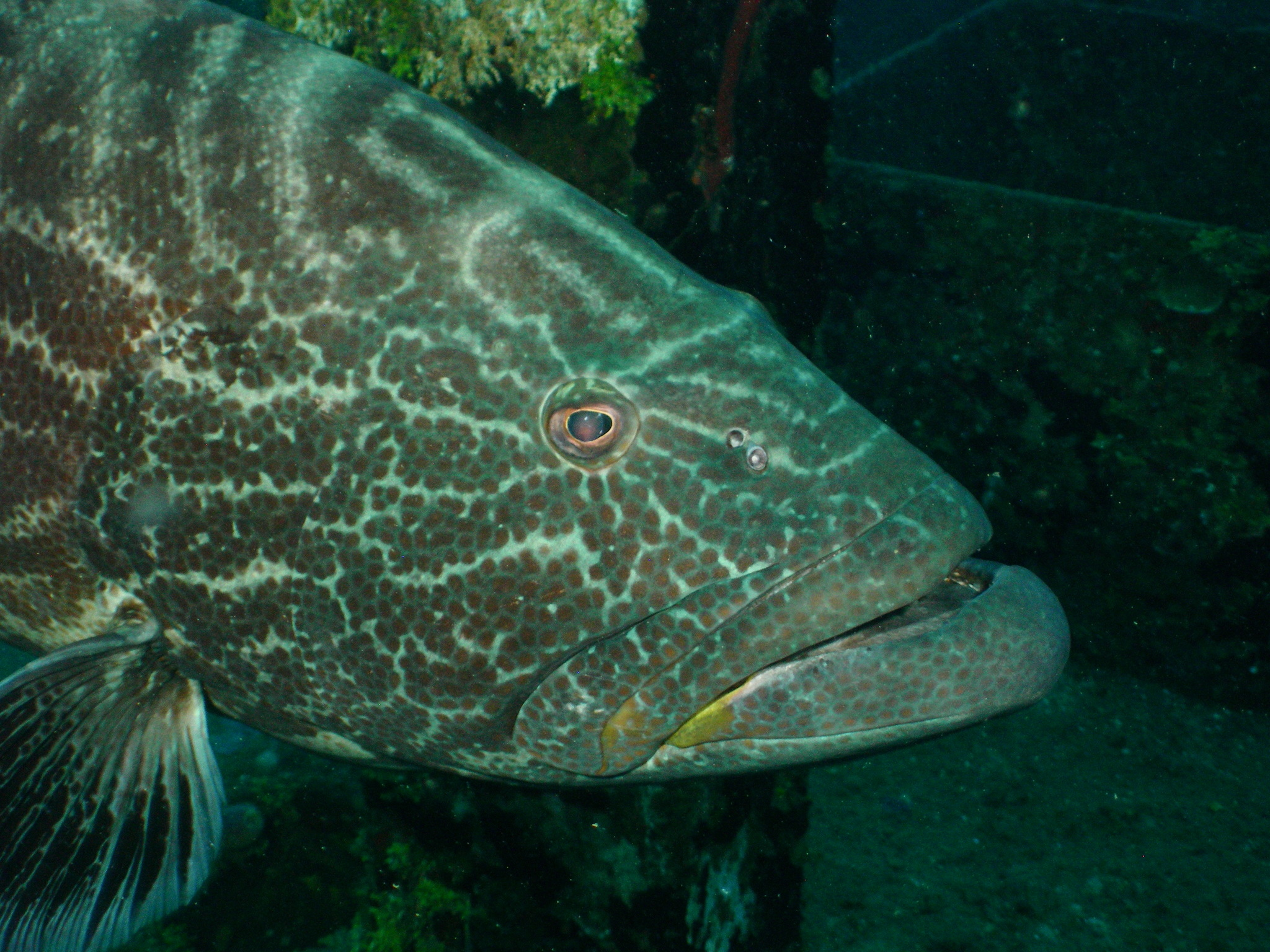
Closeup, in Honduras

Mycteroperca bonaci occurs over rocky bottoms and coral reefs at depths of 10 to 30 metres (33 to 98 ft), however in the eastern Gulf of Mexico it is normally encountered at depths of more than 30 metres (98 ft). It is usually a solitary species, the adults feeding mainly on fishes, such as grunts, snapper and herrings, and the juveniles feed on crustaceans. Black groupers have been recorded forming seasonal feeding aggregations along the outer continental shelf off Brazil, these coincide with spawning aggregations of some fish species the groupers prey on. They are monandric protogynous hermaphrodites and form spawning aggregations which have been reported from in the Gulf of Mexico and Caribbean Sea. Females attain sexual maturity at around 5years old and at a length of around 82.6 centimetres (32.5 in) and the change of sex to males occurs when they are around 15 years old and at a mean length of 121.4 centimetres (47.8 in).

=== Predators and parasites ===
The recorded predators of Mycteroperca bonaci include sandbar shark (Carcharhinus plumbeus) and great hammerhead (Sphyrna mokarran) while they may also be prey for great barracuda (Sphyraena barracuda) and moray eels. Black groupers are hosts to a variety of common parasites which include endoparasites affecting stomach and intestines and ectoparasites which live on its skin.

== Utilisation ==
Mycteroperca bonaci is quite tasty and an important food fish. It is fished for sale and for sport.

== Conservation ==
Mycteroperca bonaci is an IUCN Red List near threatened species, vulnerable to increases in exploitation because it is a relatively slow breeder.
