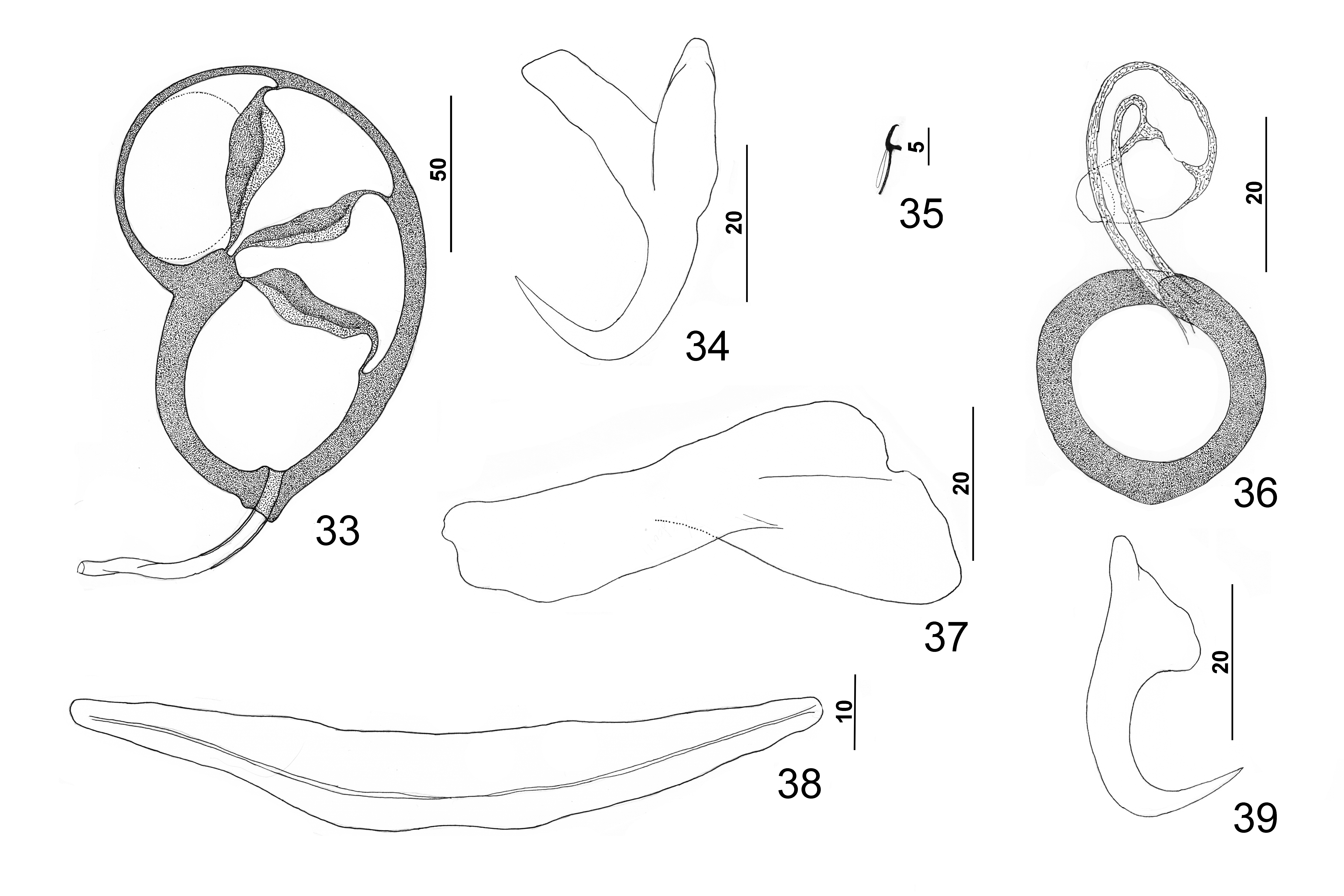
- Sclerotised parts of body

Scientific classification
- Kingdom: Animalia
- Phylum: Platyhelminthes
- Class: Monogenea
- Order: Dactylogyridea
- Family: Diplectanidae
- Genus: Pseudorhabdosynochus
- Species: P. capurroi

Binomial name
- Pseudorhabdosynochus capurroi Vidal-Martínez & Mendoza-Franco, 1998

= Pseudorhabdosynochus capurroi =

Species of flatworm

Pseudorhabdosynochus capurroi is a diplectanid monogenean parasitic on the gills of the Black grouper, Mycteroperca bonaci. It was described by Vidal-Martínez and Mendoza-Franco in 1998 and redescribed successively by Yang, Gibson and Zeng in 2005 and by Kritsky, Bakenhaster and Adams in 2015.

== Etymology ==
The species was named in honor of Dr. Luis René Capurro Filograsso, "in recognition to his guidance, kindness and support of Mexican students."

== Description ==
Pseudorhabdosynochus capurroi is a small monogenean. The species has the general characteristics of other species of Pseudorhabdosynochus, with a flat body and a posterior haptor, which is the organ by which the monogenean attaches itself to the gill of is host. The haptor bears two squamodiscs, one ventral and one dorsal. The sclerotized male copulatory organ, or "quadriloculate organ", has the shape of a bean with four internal chambers, as in other species of Pseudorhabdosynochus. The vagina includes a sclerotized part, which is a complex structure.

== Diagnosis ==
Kritsky, Bakenhaster & Adams (2015) wrote that the species was easily differentiated from all species of Pseudorhabdosynochus by the morphology of its dorsal bars, which Vidal-Martínez & Mendoza-Franco described as being “twisted”. The morphology of the anchors, ventral bar, hooks, and vaginal sclerite is nearly identical to that of P. kritskyi, which differs most significantly from P. capurroi by possessing dorsal bars with enlarged bilobed medial ends and lacking the twisted nature of those of P. capurroi.

== Hosts and localities ==
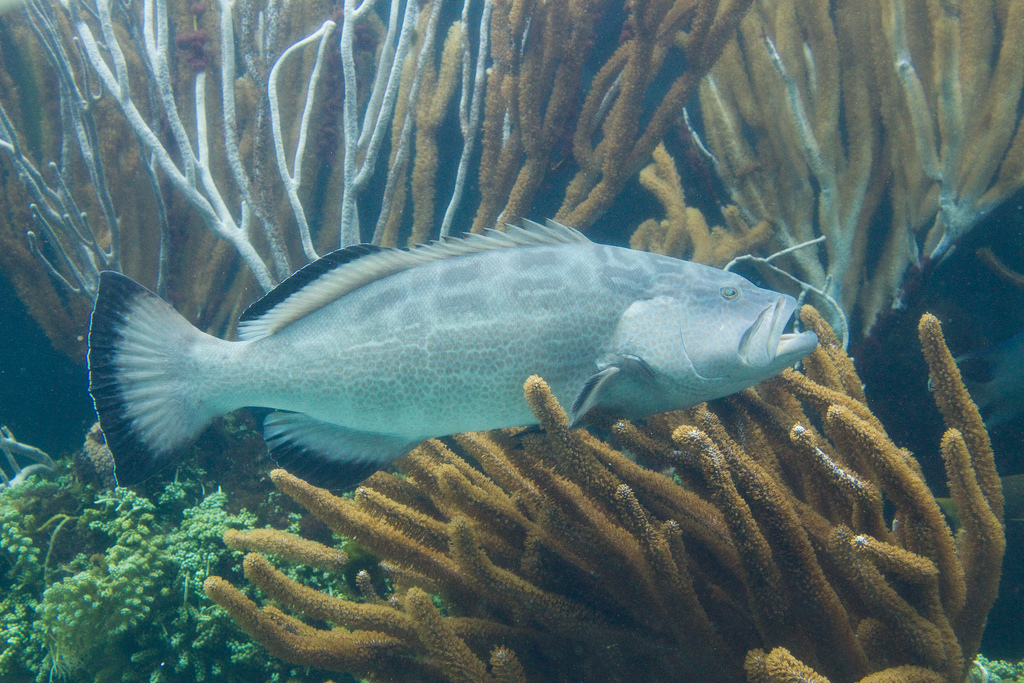
The black grouper, Mycteroperca bonaci is the type-host of Pseudorhabdosynochus capurroi

The type-host and only recorded host is the Black grouper, Mycteroperca bonaci (Serranidae: Epinephelinae). The type-locality is Chuburna, Yucatan State, Mexico Other localities are Celestun and Progreso, Yucatan State, Mexico; near North Rock, Bermuda; Parque Nacional Arrecife Alacranes, Yucatan, Mexico; Ría Celestun Biosphere Reserve, Yucatán, Mexico; and Laguna las Marites, Isla de Margarita, Venezuela.
