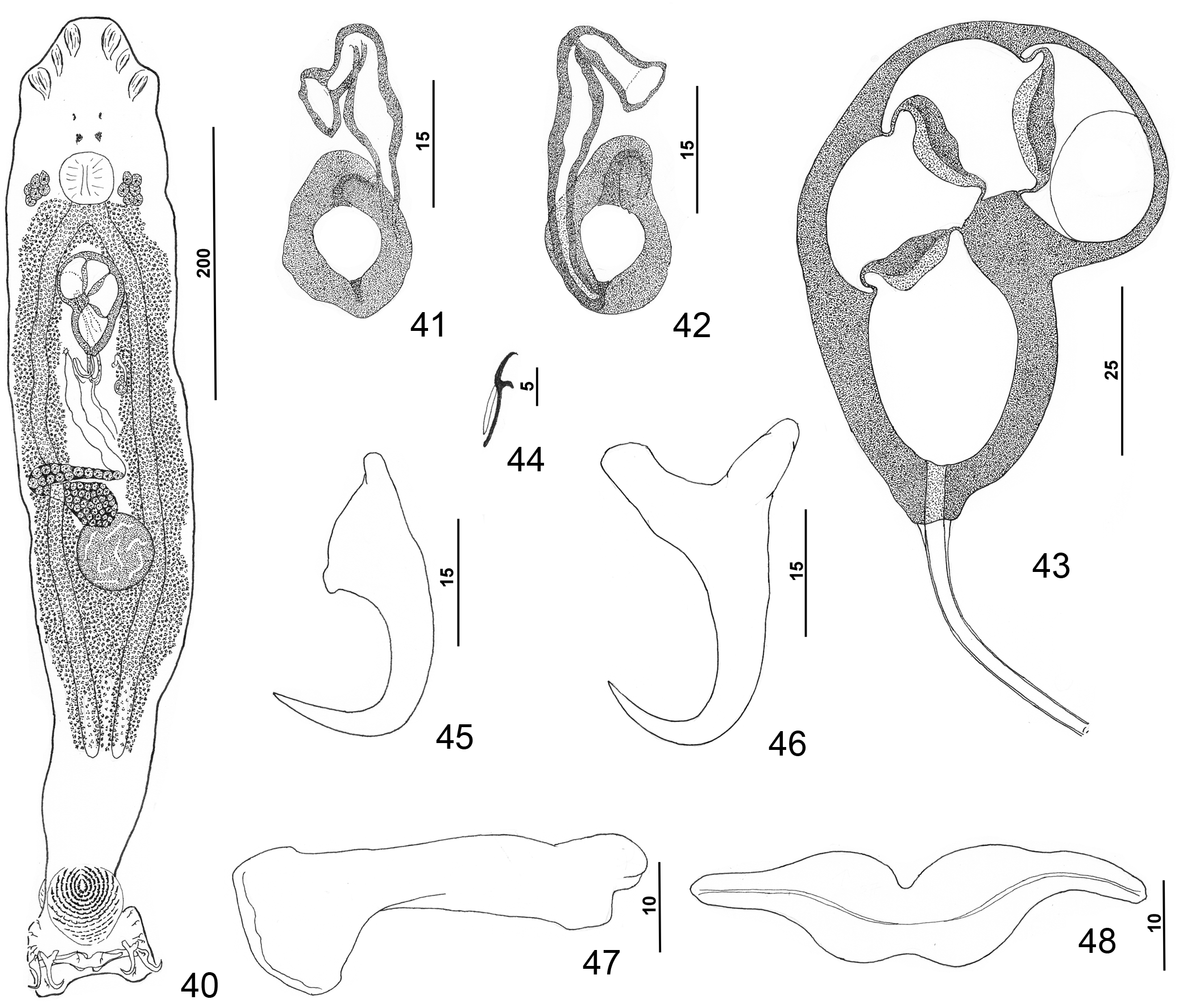
- Body and sclerotised parts

Scientific classification
- Kingdom: Animalia
- Phylum: Platyhelminthes
- Class: Monogenea
- Order: Dactylogyridea
- Family: Diplectanidae
- Genus: Pseudorhabdosynochus
- Species: P. hyphessometochus

Binomial name
- Pseudorhabdosynochus hyphessometochus Kritsky, Bakenhaster & Adams, 2015

= Pseudorhabdosynochus hyphessometochus =

Species of flatworm

Pseudorhabdosynochus hyphessometochus is a diplectanid monogenean parasitic on the gills of the yellowmouth grouper, Mycteroperca interstitialis. It has been described by Kritsky, Bakenhaster and Adams in 2015.

== Description ==
Pseudorhabdosynochus hyphessometochus is a small monogenean. The species has the general characteristics of other species of Pseudorhabdosynochus, with a flat body and a posterior haptor, which is the organ by which the monogenean attaches itself to the gill of is host. The haptor bears two squamodiscs, one ventral and one dorsal. The sclerotized male copulatory organ, or "quadriloculate organ", has the shape of a bean with four internal chambers, as in other species of Pseudorhabdosynochus. The vagina includes a sclerotized part, which is a complex structure.

The description by Kritsky, Bakenhaster & Adams in 2015 includes the following: Body flattened dorsoventrally, with broad cephalic region, trunk with nearly parallel lateral margins, and moderately long peduncle tapering posteriorly. Tegumental scales absent. Cephalic region with terminal and two bilateral poorly developed lobes; three pairs of head organs; pair of bilateral groups of cephalic-gland cells at level of pharynx. Two pairs of eyespots anterior to pharynx lacking lenses; chromatic granules small, irregular in outline; accessory granules usually absent in cephalic region. Pharynx subspherical; esophagus short to nonexistent; intestinal ceca blind, extending posteriorly into anterior portion of peduncle. Haptor with dorsal and ventral anteromedial lobes containing respective squamodiscs and lateral lobes having hook pairs 2–4, 6, 7. Squamodiscs subequal, with 12 or 13 concentric U-shaped rows of rodlets; innermost rows of ventral squamodisc (three) and dorsal squamodisc (two) closed, forming ovals. Ventral anchor with short superficial root, deep root with small lateral swelling, slightly curved to straight shaft, and recurved point extending to level of tip of superficial root. Dorsal anchor with subtriangular base, short roots, curved shaft, and recurved point extending past level of tip of superficial root. Ventral bar with deep medial constriction, tapered ends, longitudinal ventral groove. Paired dorsal bar with spatulate medial end. Hook with depressed thumb, delicate point, uniform shank; FH loop about shank length. Testis subspherical; proximal vas deferens not observed; seminal vesicle a slight dilation of vas deferens; distal vas deferens entering elongate thick-walled ejaculatory bulb; ejaculatory duct entering male copulatory organthrough portal of proximal chamber. A second duct of unknown origin and function entering portal of male copulatory organ. Male copulatory organ reniform, quadriloculate, with short tapered cone; walls of chambers comparatively thick; distal tube elongate; retractile filament not observed. Germarium pyriform, dorsoventrally looping right intestinal cecum; Mehlis’ gland not observed; uterus delicate, with variable diameter. Vaginal sclerite with distal tube having single recurve before its attachment to vaginal vestibule; pear-shaped chamber with thick walls and small cavity; vaginal canal and seminal receptacle not observed. Vitellarium absent in regions of other reproductive organs, otherwise dense throughout trunk and extending into anterior portion of peduncle. Egg elongate ovate, lacking filaments. Measurements: Body 695 μm long; width at level of germarium 128 μm. Haptor 132 μm wide; squamodisc 56 μm long, 52 μm wide. Ventral anchor 37 μm long; dorsal anchor 33 μm long. Ventral bar 55 μm long; dorsal bar 46 μm long. Hook 11 μm long. Pharynx 45 μm wide. Male copulatory organ 72 μm long. Testis 65 μm long, 61 μm wide. Germarial bulb 41 μm wide. Egg 86–87 μm long, 35–36 μm wide.

== Etymology ==
Kritsky, Bakenhaster & Adams (2015), who described the species, indicated that the specific name was from Greek (hyphesson = somewhat smaller + metochos = a companion) and refers to the species being a member of the group of similar species of Pseudorhabdosynochus parasitizing groupers assigned to Mycteroperca and having a comparatively small cavity within the chamber of the vaginal sclerite.

== Diagnosis ==
Kritsky, Bakenhaster & Adams (2015) wrote that "Pseudorhabdosynochus hyphessometochus is a member of the apparently closely related group of Pseudorhabdosynochus species infecting most Mycteroperca species occurring in the western Atlantic region. It most closely resembles P. mycteropercae in the basic morphology of the male copulatory organ and haptoral sclerites but is distinguished from the latter species by having a vaginal sclerite with a smaller thick-walled chamber with a reduced cavity and a distal tube with a single recurve before its attachment to the vaginal vestibule."

== Hosts and localities ==
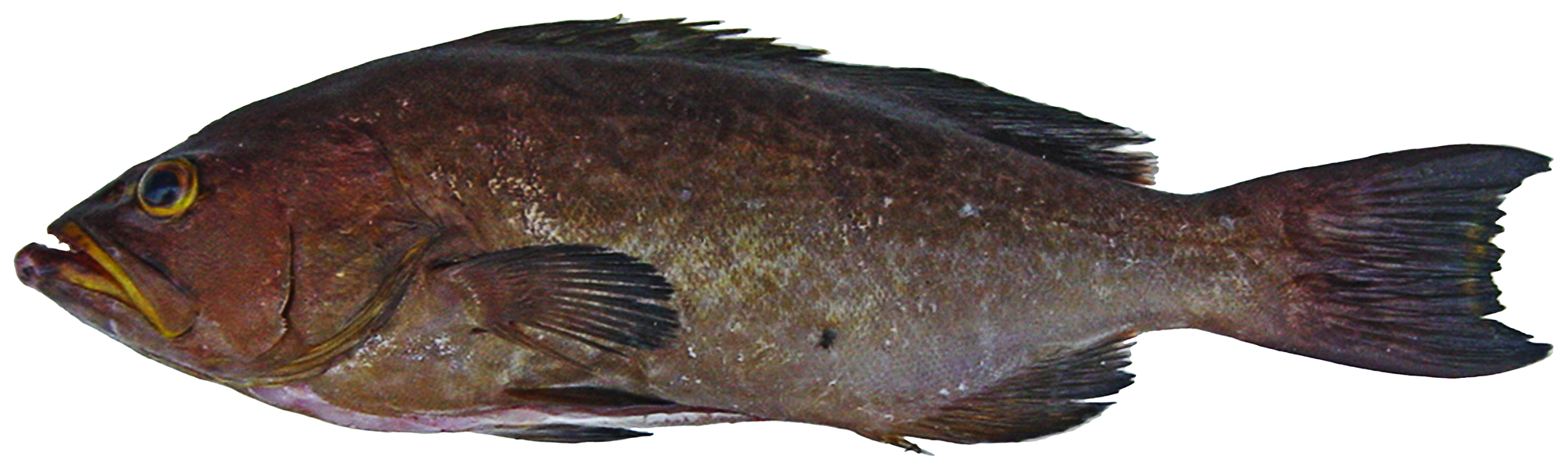
The yellowmouth grouper, Mycteroperca interstitialis is the type-host of Pseudorhabdosynochus hyphessometochus

The type-host and only recorded host is the yellowmouth grouper, Mycteroperca interstitialis (Serranidae: Epinephelinae). The type-locality if 115 miles NW of Tampa, Florida; the single other locality is 135 miles SW of Galveston, Texas.
