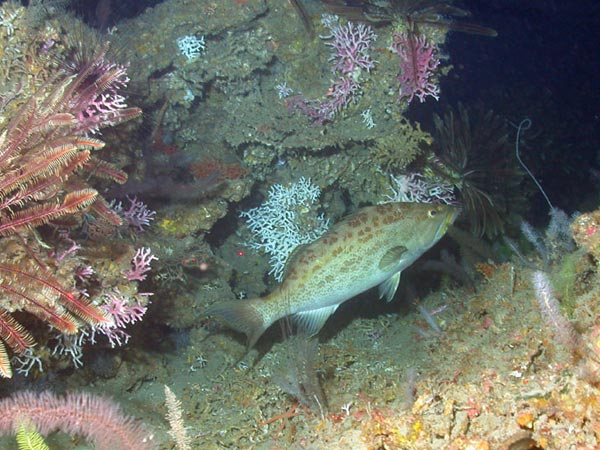

Conservation status
- Data Deficient (IUCN 3.1)

Scientific classification
- Kingdom: Animalia
- Phylum: Chordata
- Class: Actinopterygii
- Order: Perciformes
- Family: Epinephelidae
- Genus: Mycteroperca
- Species: M. phenax

Binomial name
- Mycteroperca phenax Jordan & Swain, 1884

= Scamp grouper =

Species of fish

The scamp grouper (Mycteroperca phenax), also known as scamp, is a species of marine ray-finned fish, a grouper from the subfamily Epinephelinae which is part of the family Serranidae, which also includes the anthias and sea basses. It is found in the western Atlantic Ocean.

== Description ==
The scamp grouper has a body that is elongate, robust and compressed with its depth being the same at the origin of the dorsal fin as it is at the origin of the anal fin. The standard length is 3.0 to 3.4 times the body's depth. The preopercle is angular, with an obvious bony lobe at its serrated angle. The dorsal fin contains 11 spines and 16-18 soft rays while the anal fin contains 3 spines and 10-12 soft rays. The membranes between the dorsal fin spines are incised. The caudal fin is concave. Four phases of colour and pattern have been described. One has the head and body pale brown in background colour but the body is almost entirely covered in small dark red-brown spots, one on each scale, these frequently form clusters shaped like the paw-prints and these form saddle-like blotches along the back and elongate blotches on the flanks. These spots extend onto the dorsal and anal fins while the pectoral fin has a dark inner margin and a whitish outer margin. The caudal fin is dark with a pale margin. A second phase is pale brown, and its upper body has clusters of dark brown spots that look like cat's paws. The third phase has large adults which have a silvery grey head and front of the body with dark reticulations and the posterior two-thirds of the body are dark. This phase has a few white spots on the abdomen, at the base of the caudal fin and above the anal fin. It also has black margins on the pectoral fins and a pale edged dark tail. The fourth colour phase is bicolored, pale brown anteriorly, changing abruptly to dark from the soft rayed part of the dorsal fin. Juveniles do not have a bicolored phase. This species attains a total length of 107 centimetres (42 in), although they are more commonly around 30 centimetres (12 in), and a maximum published weight of 14.2 kilograms (31 lb).

== Distribution ==
The scamp grouper occurs in the western Atlantic Ocean from North Carolina south along the southern Atlantic coast of the United States into the Gulf of Mexico where it has been recorded as far south as Belize, but it is absent from much of the West Indies It is also found along the Caribbean coast of South America from Colombia to Tobago. Juveniles are sometimes recorded as far north as Massachusetts and a vagrant has been caught in the Azores.

== Habitat and biology ==
The scamp grouper is found at depths of 0 to 100 metres (0 to 328 ft), the adults are found over rock ledges and rocky bottoms with high relief usually deeper than 30 metres (98 ft). Juveniles are found in reefs in shallower water and will enter estuaries and mangroves. The adults will migrate from deep water to shallower water when the temperature drops below 8.6 °C (47.5 °F) at the bottom of the water column. It is a protogynous hermaphrodite forming small, short-lived spawning aggregations, which may be ten to a few hundred strong over offshore reefs with high relief along the edge of the continental shelf. These take place from February until July in United States Atlantic waters and in the Gulf of Mexico, peaking from March to the middle of May. Scamp are the most numerous grouper in areas of living Oculina reefs at depths between 70 and 100 metres (230 and 330 ft) off the eastern coast of Florida. It has been suggested that scamp prefer areas of high topographic complexity as they are relatively small in size and they can use overhangs, ledges and caves to shelter from predators like sharks and greater amberjack (Seriola dumerili). It feeds on fishes, benthic crustaceans and octopuses.

== Taxonomy ==
The scamp grouper was first formally described in 1884 as Mycteroperca falcata phenax by the American ichthyologist David Starr Jordan (1851-1931) and the biologist and mathematician Joseph Swain (1857-1927) with the type locality given as Key West and Pensacola in Florida.

== Utilisation and conservation ==
The scamp is a popular game and commercial fish and is high prized among the grouper family. Its meat is white in colour, sweet in taste and has excellent food value. The name "scamp" is said to be because of their ability to steal bait from hooks without being caught. There is a lack of population data for this species in a large part of its range and there is a major threat from fishing, as a result, the IUCN has classified it as Data Deficient.

== USS Scamp ==
The scamp has had two United States Navy submarines USS Scamp (SS-277) (1942-1944) and USS Scamp (SSN-588) (1960-1988) named after it.
