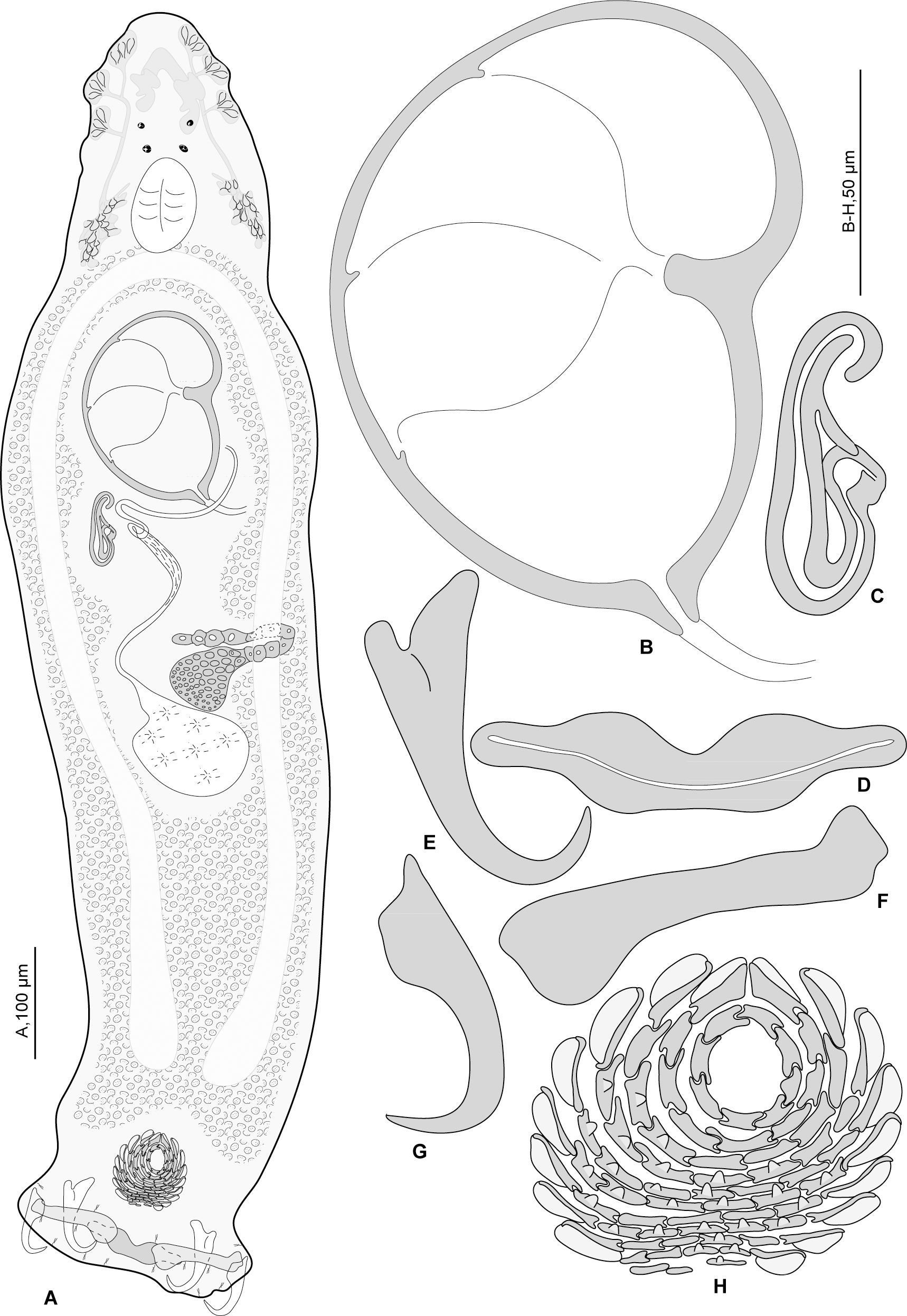
- Pseudorhabdosynochus oliveri, body and sclerotised parts

Scientific classification
- Kingdom: Animalia
- Phylum: Platyhelminthes
- Class: Monogenea
- Order: Dactylogyridea
- Family: Diplectanidae
- Genus: Pseudorhabdosynochus
- Species: P. oliveri

Binomial name
- Pseudorhabdosynochus oliveri Chaabane, Neifar, Gey & Justine, 2016

= Pseudorhabdosynochus oliveri =

Species of flatworm

Pseudorhabdosynochus oliveri is a diplectanid monogenean parasitic on the gills of the dusky grouper (Mycteroperca marginata).

== Description ==
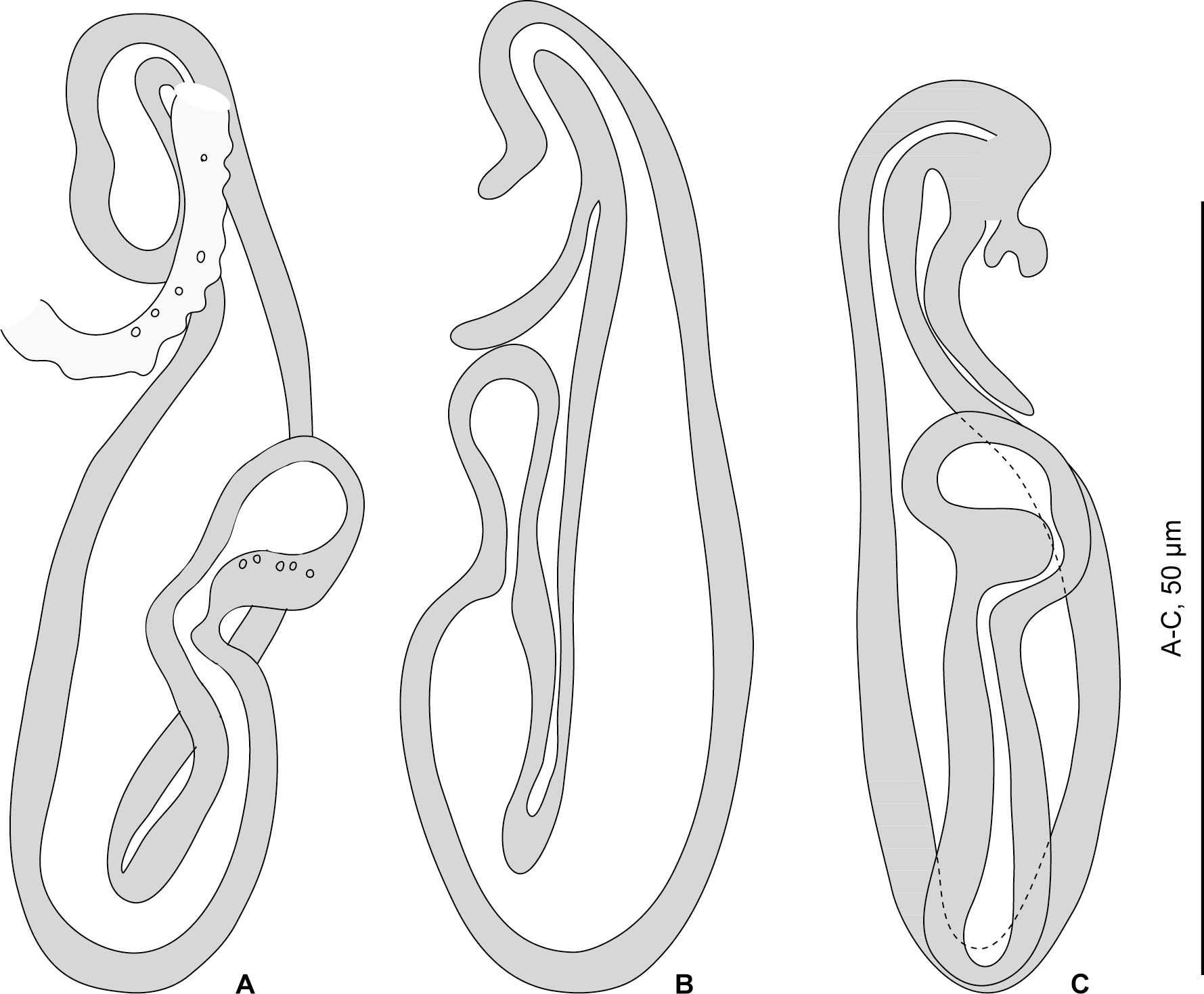
Vagina of Pseudorhabdosynochus oliveri

Pseudorhabdosynochus oliveri is a small monogenean, about 1000-1100 μm in length. The species has the general characteristics of other species of Pseudorhabdosynochus, with a flat body and a posterior haptor, which is the organ by which the monogenean attaches itself to the gill of is host. The haptor bears two squamodiscs, one ventral and one dorsal.

The sclerotized male copulatory organ, or "quadriloculate organ", has the shape of a bean with four internal chambers, as in other species of Pseudorhabdosynochus. The vagina includes a sclerotized part, which is a complex structure, about 60 μm in length.

According to Chaabane, Neifar, Gey & Justine (2016), Pseudorhabdosynochus oliveri is a member of the "Pseudorhabdosynochus beverleyburtonae group", which includes four species with common characteristics, including similar sclerotised vaginae and squamodiscs, and host groupers belonging to the genus Mycteroperca in the Mediterranean and the eastern Atlantic. These species are P. beverleyburtonae (Oliver, 1984) Kritsky & Beverley-Burton, 1986, P. sosia Neifar & Euzet, 2007, P. hayet Chaabane, Neifar, Gey & Justine, 2016 and P. oliveri.

== Etymology ==
The species was named for Guy Oliver, French parasitologist, "in recognition of his research on fish monogeneans".

== Hosts and localities ==
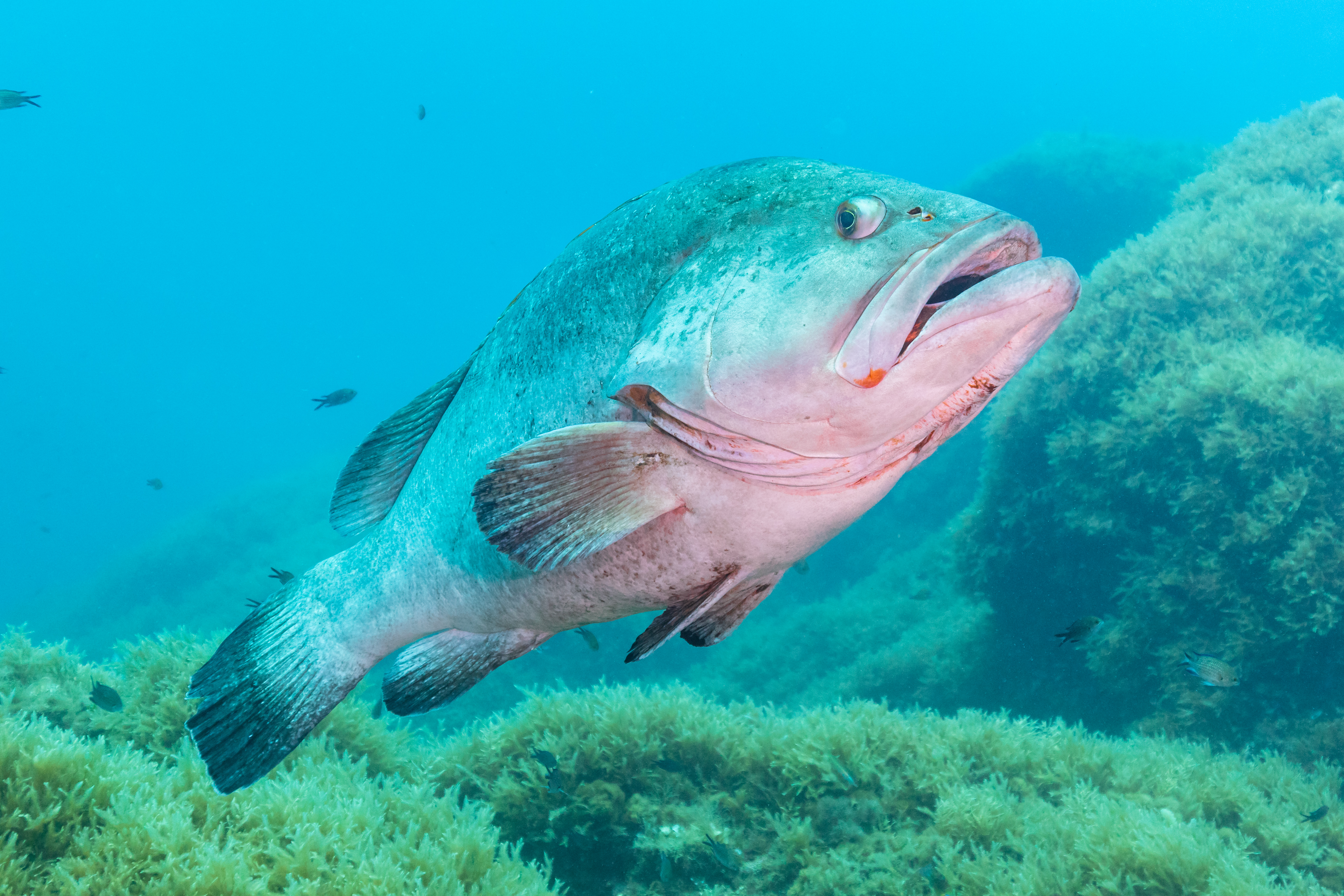
dusky grouper (Mycteroperca marginata), the host of Pseudorhabdosynochus oliveri

The type-host of Pseudorhabdosynochus oliveri is the dusky grouper (Mycteroperca marginata) and the species has not been found in another host. The type-locality if off Cape Béar, Mediterranean Sea, France. The species was described from four specimens collected by Guy Oliver in 1965 and deposited in the collections of the Muséum National d'Histoire Naturelle in Paris.
