= Pseudorhabdosynochus beverleyburtonae =

- Body and sclerotised parts

Scientific classification
- Kingdom: Animalia
- Phylum: Platyhelminthes
- Class: Monogenea
- Order: Dactylogyridea
- Family: Diplectanidae
- Genus: Pseudorhabdosynochus
- Species: P. beverleyburtonae

Binomial name
- Pseudorhabdosynochus beverleyburtonae (Oliver, 1984) Kritsky & Beverley-Burton, 1986

Synonyms
- Cycloplectanum beverleyburtonae Oliver, 1984; Diplectanum americanum of Euzet & Oliver (1965); Cycloplectanum americanum (Price, 1937) Oliver, 1968 (pro parte)

Species of flatworm

Pseudorhabdosynochus beverleyburtonae is a diplectanid monogenean parasitic on the gills of the dusky grouper, Epinephelus marginatus. It has been described by Guy Oliver in 1984 as Cycloplectanum beverleyburtonae, redescribed by Oliver in 1987, transferred to the genus Pseudorhabdosynochus by Kritsky & Beverley-Burton in 1986 as Pseudorhabdosynochus beverleyburtonae, redescribed by Kritsky, Bakenhaster and Adams in 2015, and redescribed in 2016 by Chaabane, Neifar, Gey & Justine.

== Description ==
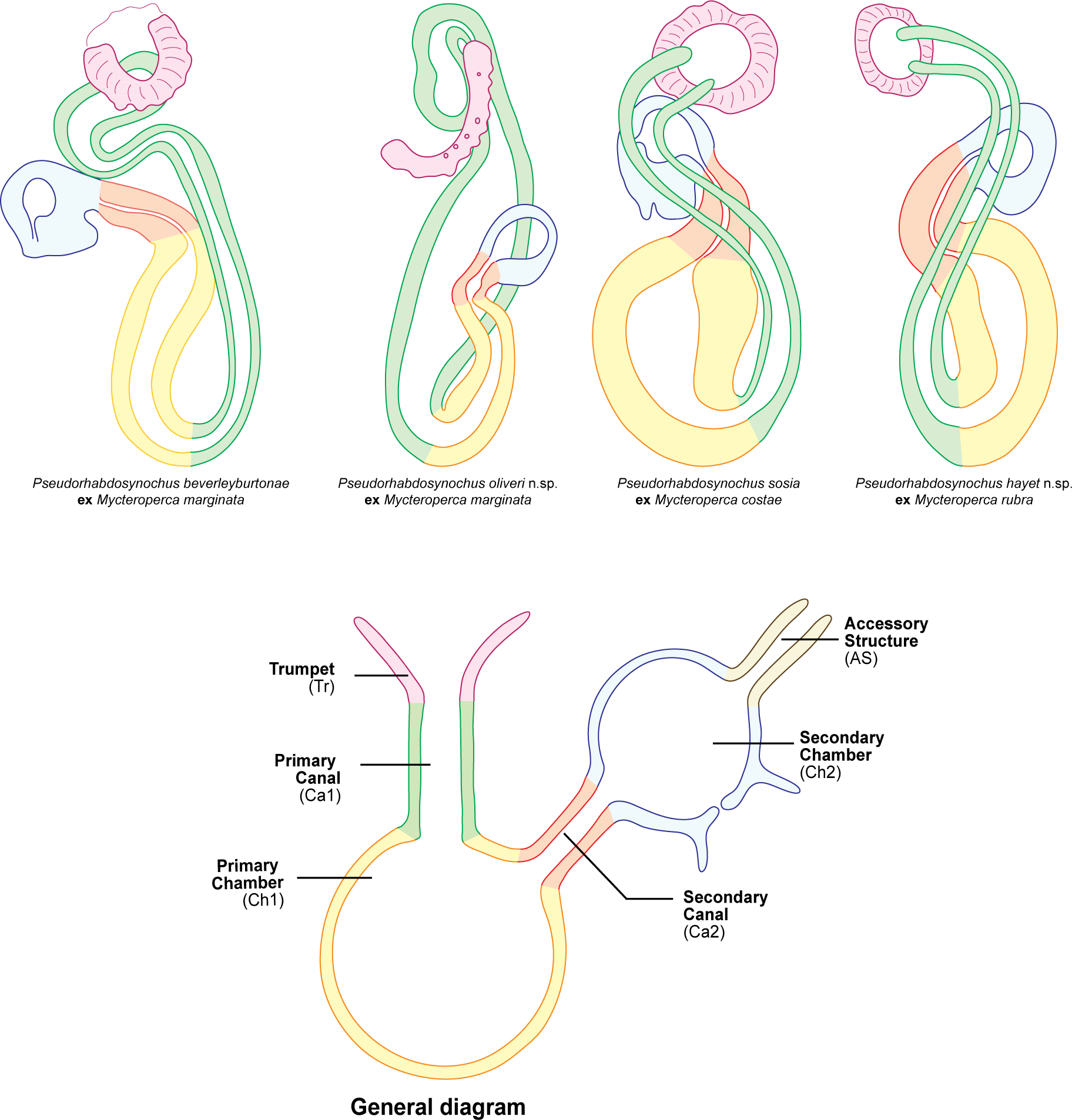
P. beverleyburtonae group - homologies of vaginae

Pseudorhabdosynochus beverleyburtonae is a small monogenean, 0.5–1 mm in length. The species has the general characteristics of other species of Pseudorhabdosynochus, with a flat body and a posterior haptor, which is the organ by which the monogenean attaches itself to the gill of is host. The haptor bears two squamodiscs, one ventral and one dorsal.

The sclerotized male copulatory organ, or "quadriloculate organ", has the shape of a bean with four internal chambers, as in other species of Pseudorhabdosynochus.

The vagina includes a sclerotized part, which is a complex structure.

Pseudorhabdosynochus beverleyburtonae was redescribed from Museum specimens and new collections from off Tunisia by Chaabane, Neifar, Gey & Justine, who proposed to erect a "beverleyburtonae group" for species who share common characteristics with it, including similar sclerotised vaginae and squamodiscs, and host groupers belonging to the genus Mycteroperca in the Mediterranean and the eastern Atlantic. These species are P. sosia Neifar & Euzet, 2007, P. hayet Chaabane, Neifar, Gey & Justine, 2016 and P. oliveri Chaabane, Neifar, Gey & Justine, 2016.

== Etymology ==
According to Oliver (1984), Pseudorhabdosynochus beverleyburtonae was named in homage to Dr. Mary Beverley-Burton from the University of Guelph (Ontario, Canada).

== Hosts and localities ==
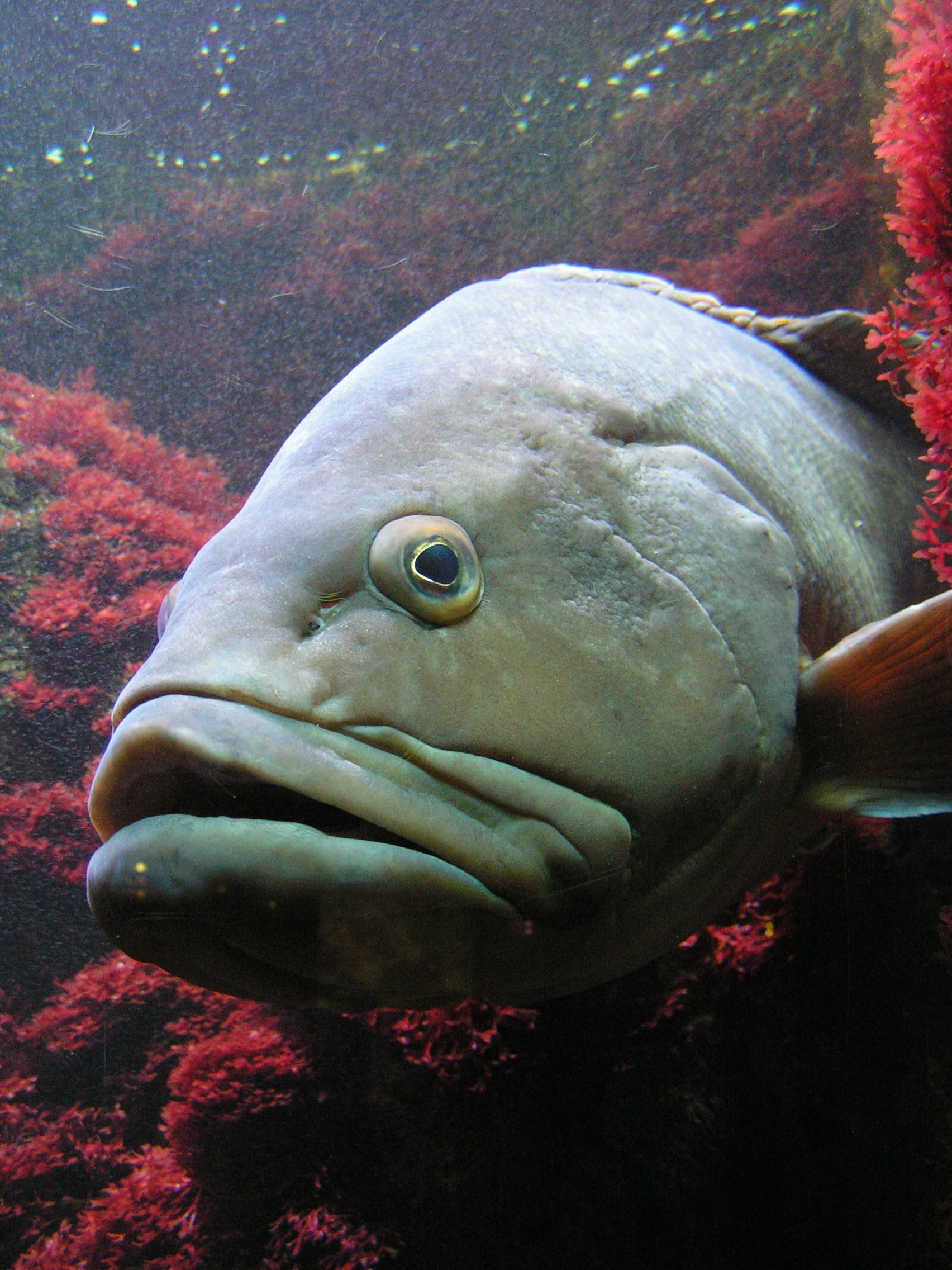
The dusky grouper, Epinephelus marginatus is the type-host of Pseudorhabdosynochus beverleyburtonae

The type-host and only recorded host of Pseudorhabdosynochus beverleyburtonae is the Dusky grouper, Epinephelus marginatus (Serranidae: Epinephelinae), which was designated as Epinephelus guaza in the original description by Oliver. The type-locality is Côte Vermeille (Mediterranean Sea, France). The species has also been recorded from the same host off Tunisia.

Pseudorhabdosynochus beverleyburtonae is one of the few monogeneans recorded from both sides of the Atlantic Ocean; it was found on its type-host, Epinephelus marginatus, off Brazil.

== Gallery ==
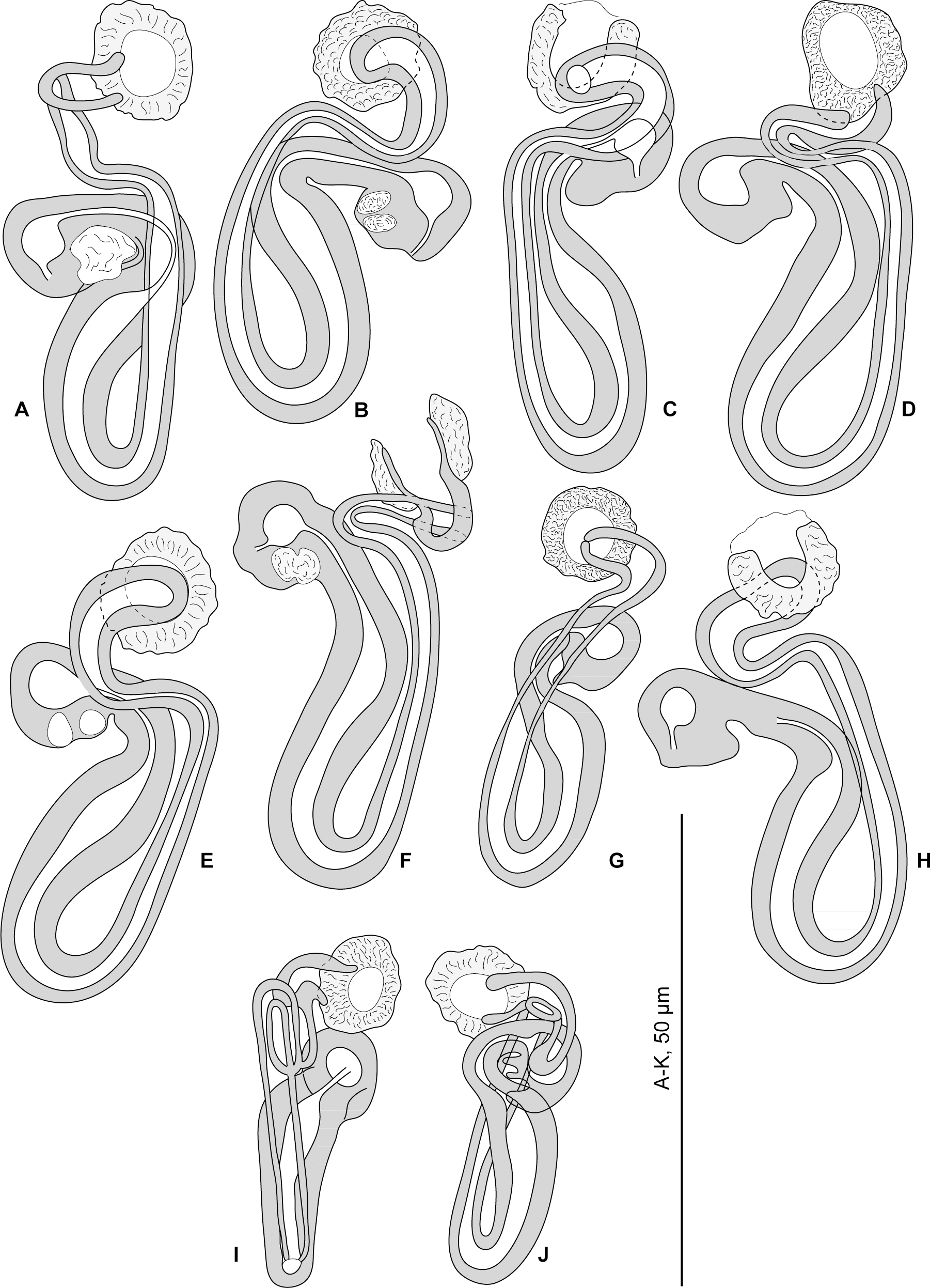
Vagina

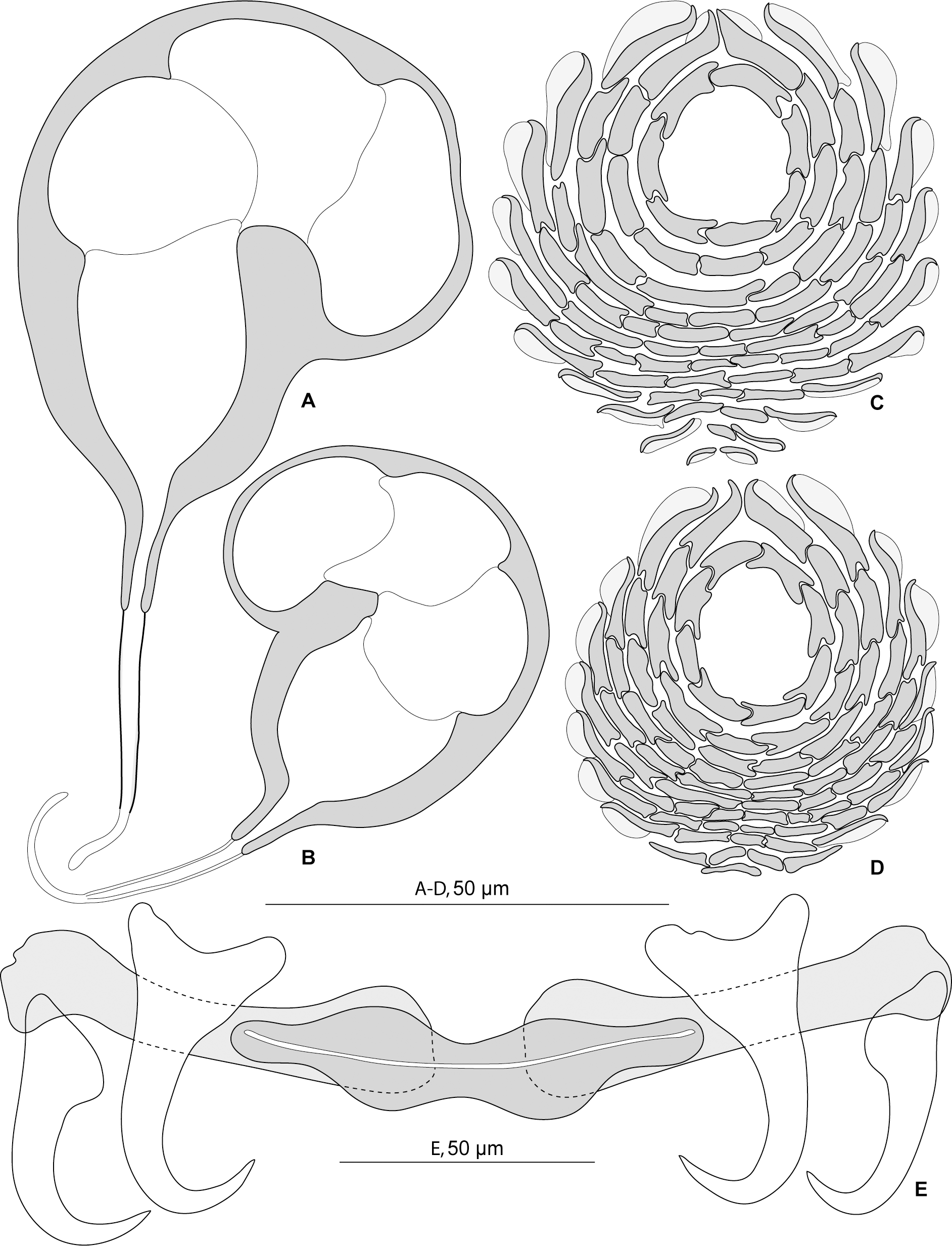
Male copulatory organ and squamodiscs

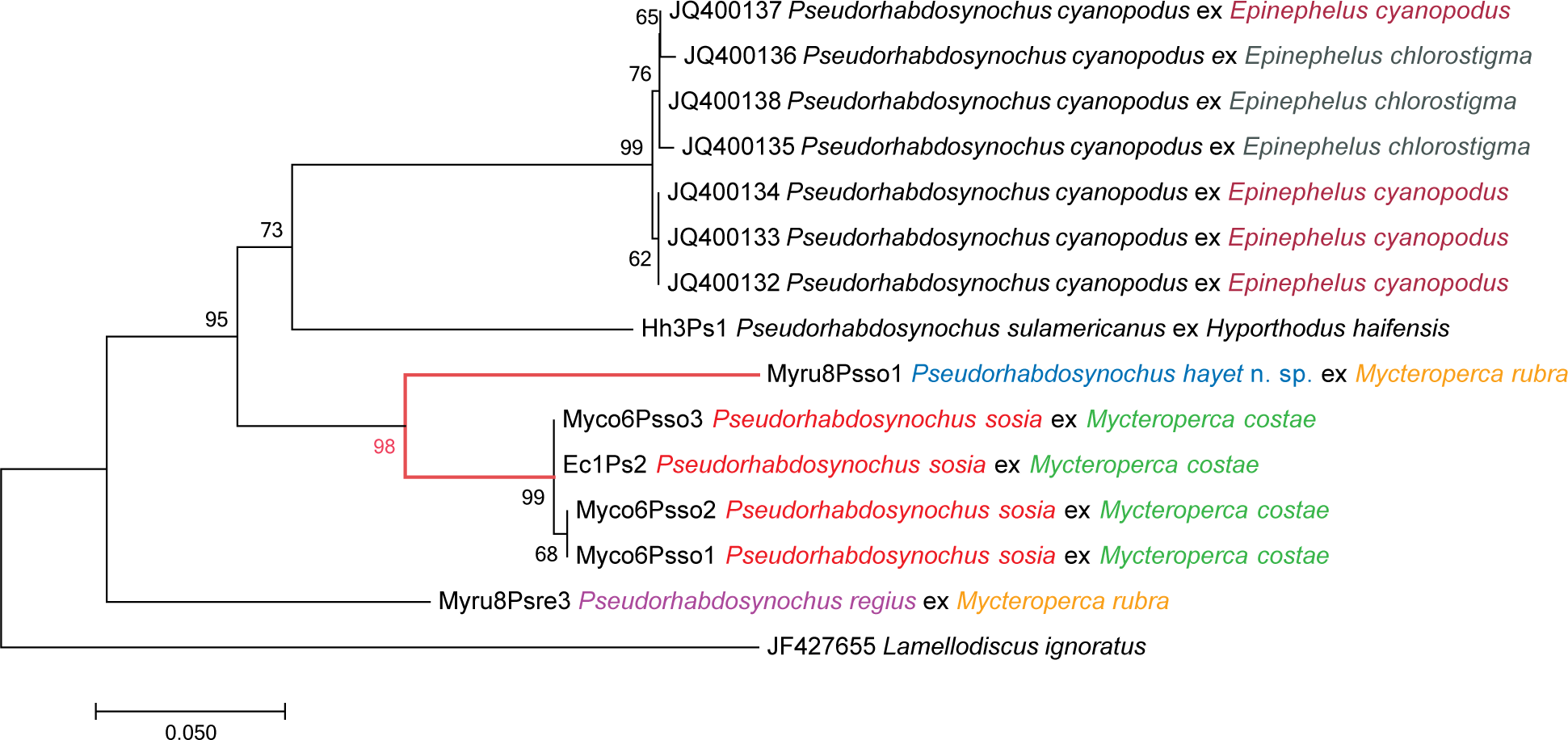
Phylogenetic relationships
