= Calceostoma calceostoma =

Scientific classification
- Domain: Eukaryota
- Kingdom: Animalia
- Phylum: Platyhelminthes
- Class: Monogenea
- Order: Dactylogyridea
- Family: Calceostomatidae
- Genus: Calceostoma
- Species: C. calceostoma

Binomial name
- Calceostoma calceostoma (Wagener, 1857)

Synonyms
- Dactylogyrus calceostoma Wagener, 1857; Calceostoma elegans van Beneden, 1858

Species of flatworm

Calceostoma calceostoma is a species of monogenean in the family Calceostomatidae. It is a parasite of the brown meagre (Sciaena umbra) in the Mediterranean.
