= Calceostoma =

Scientific classification
- Kingdom: Animalia
- Phylum: Platyhelminthes
- Class: Monogenea
- Order: Dactylogyridea
- Family: Calceostomatidae
- Genus: Calceostoma; Van Beneden, 1858

Species
- Calceostoma calceostoma (Wagener, 1857); Calceostoma glandulosum Johnston & Tiegs, 1922; Calceostoma herculanea Euzet & Vala, 1976; Calceostoma paronai (Parona & Perugia, 1892)

Genus of flatworms

Calceostoma is a genus of monogeneans in the family Calceostomatidae.
