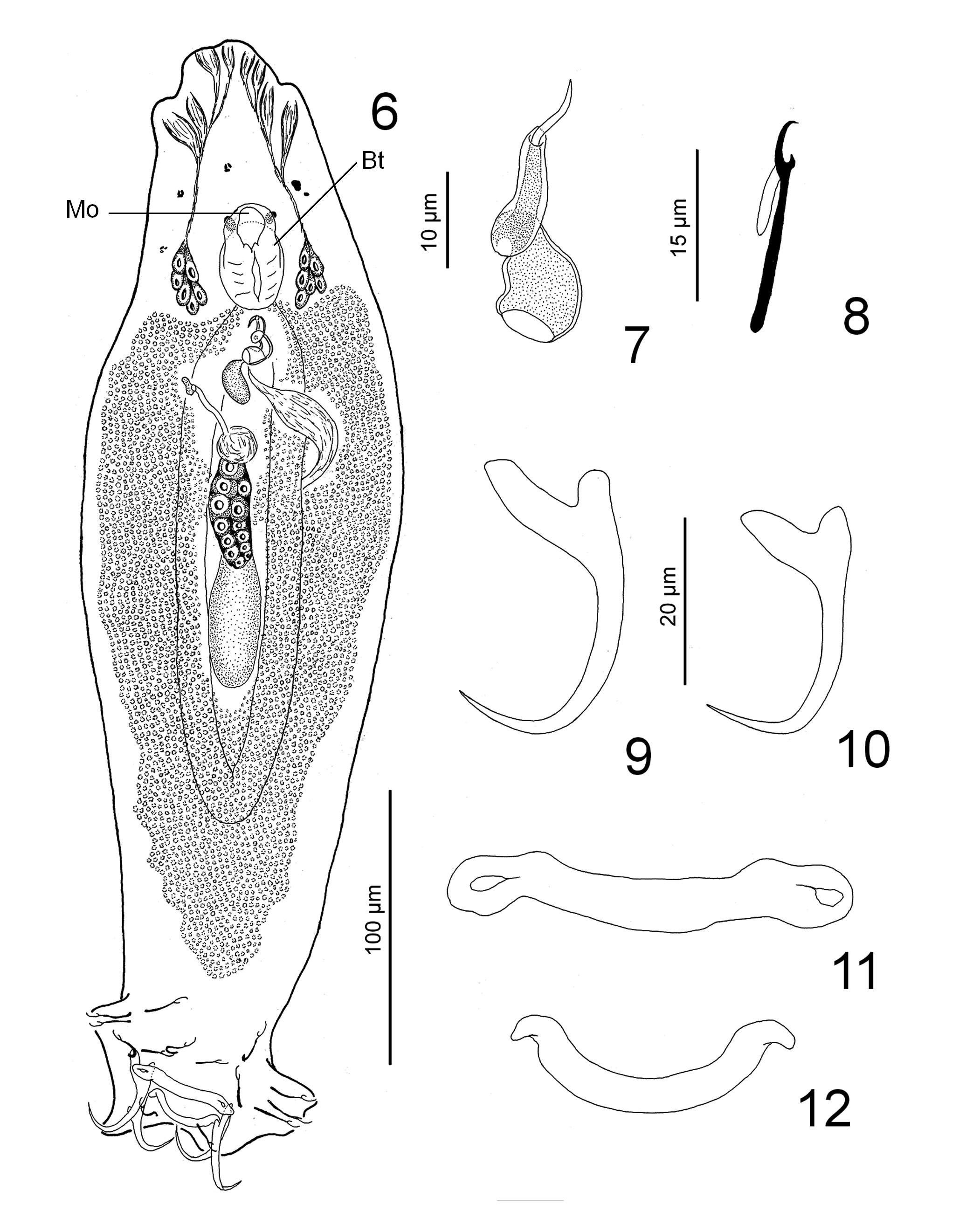

Scientific classification
- Kingdom: Animalia
- Phylum: Platyhelminthes
- Class: Monogenea
- Order: Dactylogyridea
- Family: Ancyrocephalidae
- Genus: Ancyrocephalus
- Species: A. chiapanensis

Binomial name
- Ancyrocephalus chiapanensis Mendoza-Franco, Caspeta-Mandujano & Ramírez-Martínez, 2018

= Ancyrocephalus chiapanensis =

Genus of flatworms

Ancyrocephalus chiapanensis is a species of ancyrocephalid monogenean. It is a parasite of the gills of the maya needlefish Strongylura hubbsi (Belonidae).

According to Mendoza-Franco, Caspeta-Mandujano and Ramírez-Martínez, the species resembles other species of Ancyrocephalus but can be differentiated by details of the male copulatory organ and of the haptor.

The species was found on fish collected in the Rio Lacantún basin in the Montes Azules Biosphere Reserve, Chiapas, Mexico.
