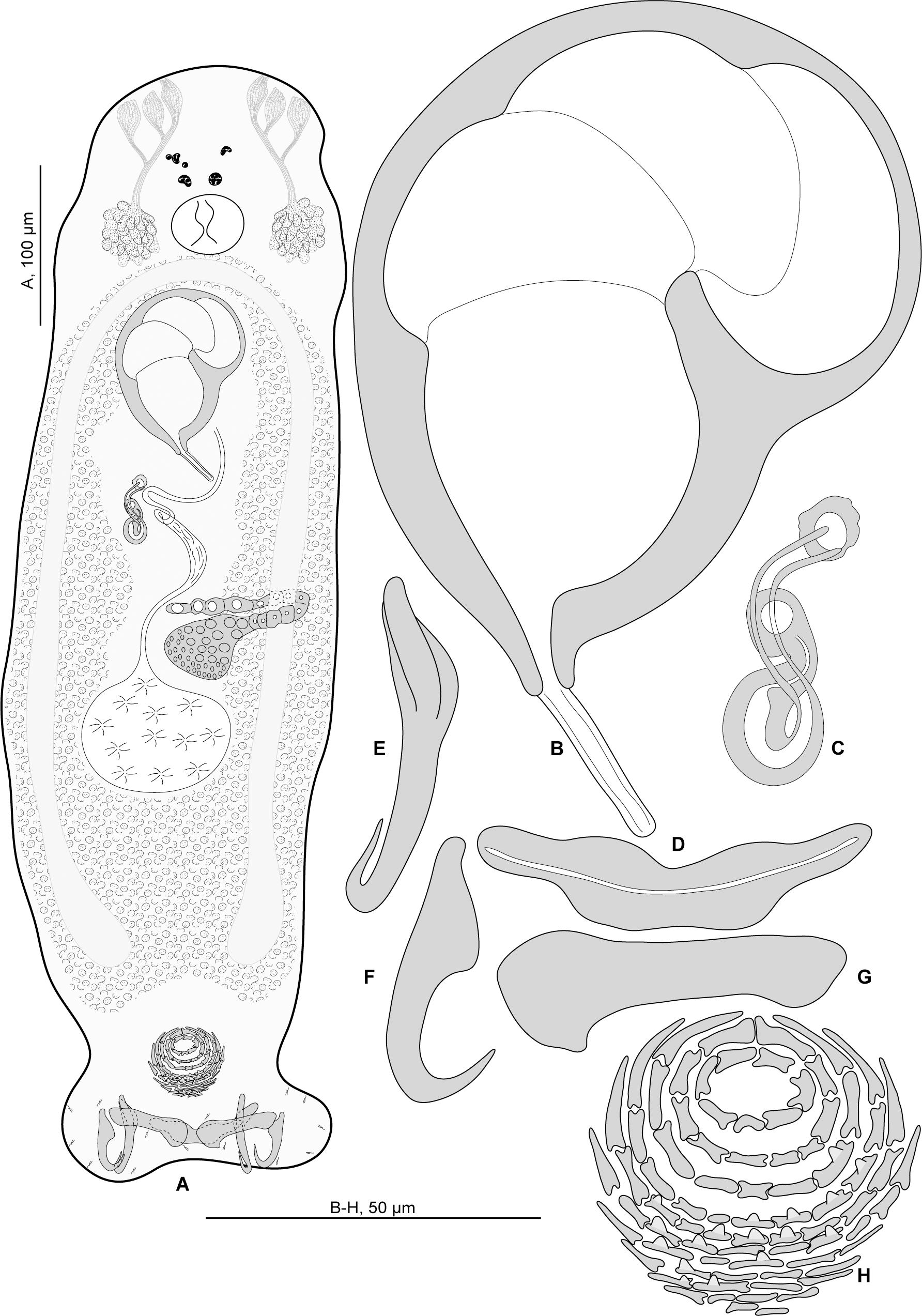
- Pseudorhabdosynochus hayet, body and sclerotised parts

Scientific classification
- Kingdom: Animalia
- Phylum: Platyhelminthes
- Class: Monogenea
- Order: Dactylogyridea
- Family: Diplectanidae
- Genus: Pseudorhabdosynochus
- Species: P. hayet

Binomial name
- Pseudorhabdosynochus hayet Chaabane, Neifar, Gey & Justine, 2016

= Pseudorhabdosynochus hayet =

Species of flatworm

Pseudorhabdosynochus hayet is a diplectanid monogenean parasitic on the gills of the mottled grouper (Mycteroperca rubra).

== Description ==
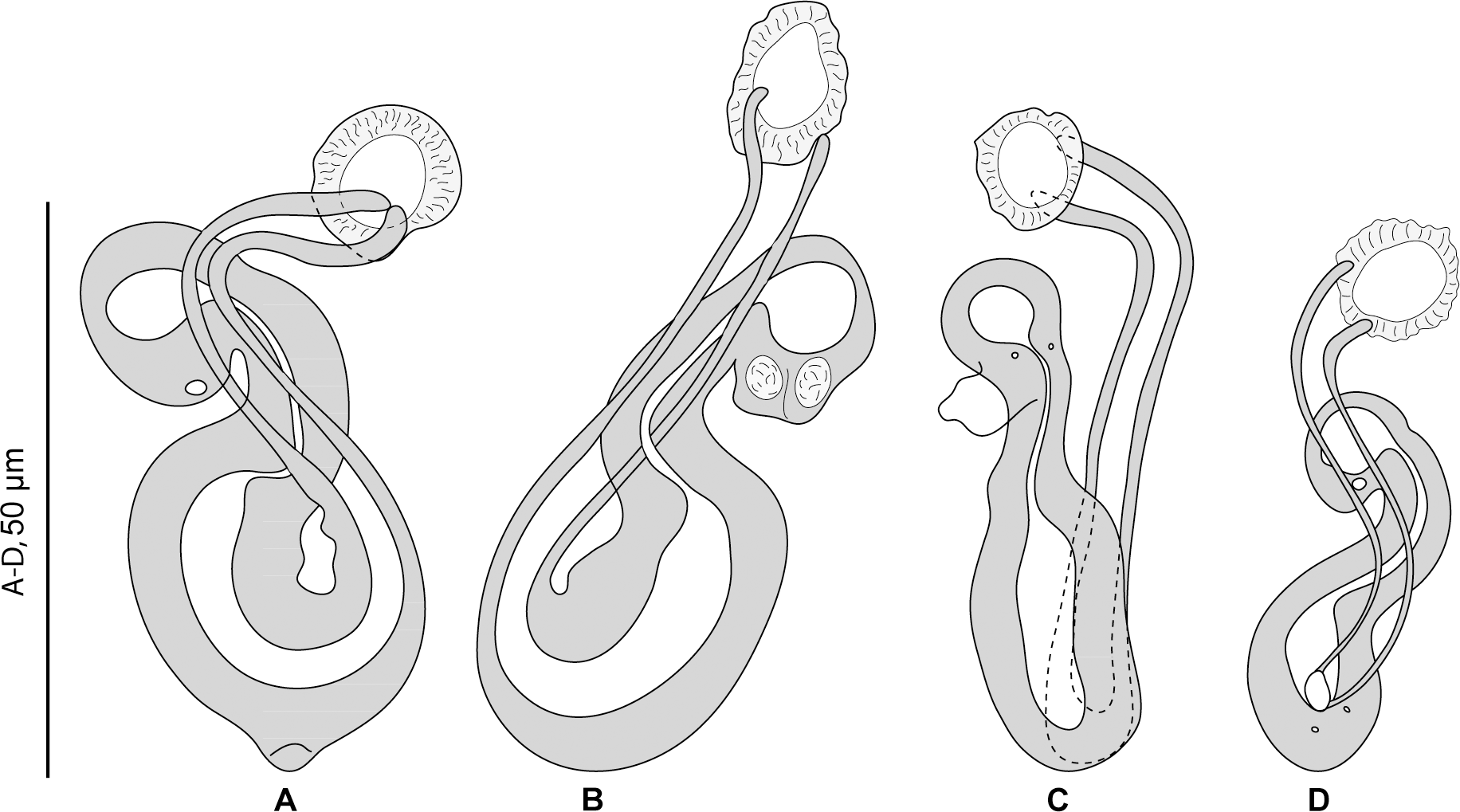
Vagina of Pseudorhabdosynochus hayet

Pseudorhabdosynochus hayet is a small monogenean, about 700-1200 μm in length. The species has the general characteristics of other species of Pseudorhabdosynochus, with a flat body and a posterior haptor, which is the organ by which the monogenean attaches itself to the gill of is host. The haptor bears two squamodiscs, one ventral and one dorsal.

The sclerotized male copulatory organ, or "quadriloculate organ", has the shape of a bean with four internal chambers, as in other species of Pseudorhabdosynochus. The vagina includes a sclerotized part, which is a complex structure, 40-70 μm in length.

According to Chaabane, Neifar, Gey & Justine (2016), Pseudorhabdosynochus hayet is a member of the "Pseudorhabdosynochus beverleyburtonae group", which includes four species with common characteristics, including similar sclerotised vaginae and squamodiscs, and host groupers belonging to the genus Mycteroperca in the Mediterranean and the eastern Atlantic. These species are P. beverleyburtonae (Oliver, 1984) Kritsky & Beverley-Burton, 1986, P. sosia Neifar & Euzet, 2007, P. oliveri Chaabane, Neifar, Gey & Justine, 2016, and P. hayet.

== Etymology ==
The specific name, hayet, is from Arabic (حياة). The species was named after the mother of the first author of the taxon.

== Hosts and localities ==
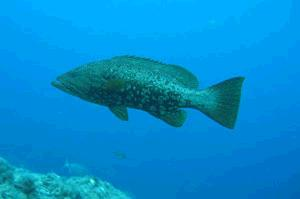
The mottled grouper (Mycteroperca rubra) is the host of Pseudorhabdosynochus hayet

The type-host of Pseudorhabdosynochus hayet is the grouper mottled grouper (Mycteroperca rubra) and the species has not been found in another host. The type-locality if off Dakar, Senegal. The monogenean has also been found on fish of the same species caught off Sfax and Tunis, Tunisia. Thus, P. hayet is known from the Mediterranean Sea and the Eastern Atlantic. The same is true for another species from the same host, P. regius Chaabane, Neifar & Justine, 2015.
