= Tetraonchus =

Scientific classification
- Kingdom: Animalia
- Phylum: Platyhelminthes
- Class: Monogenea
- Order: Dactylogyridea
- Family: Tetraonchidae
- Genus: Tetraonchus; Diesing, 1858

Genus of flatworms

Tetraonchus is a genus of flatworms belonging to the family Tetraonchidae.

The species of this genus are found in Northern America.

Species:

- Tetraonchus alaskensis Price, 1937
- Tetraonchus awakurai Ogawa & Egusa, 1978
