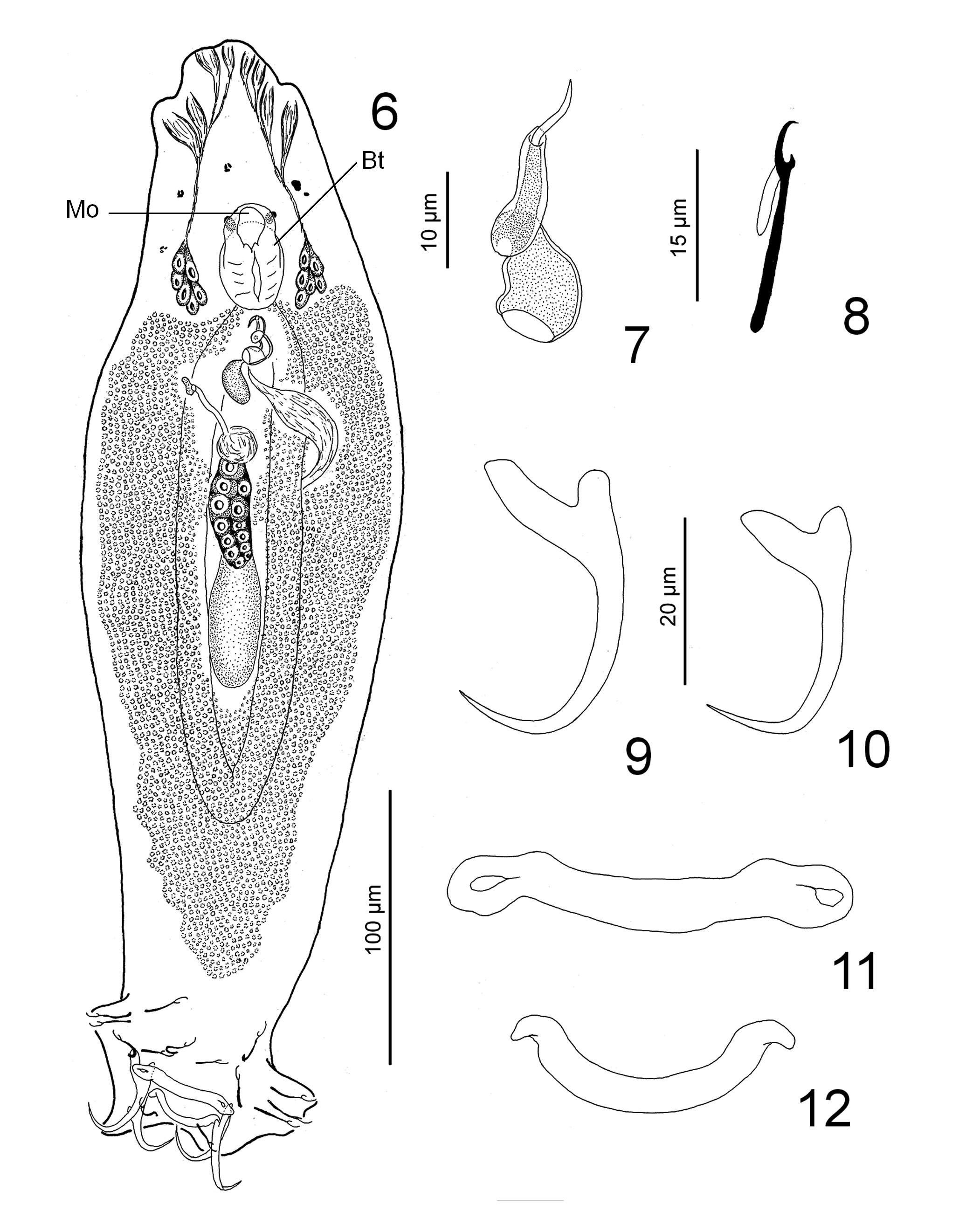
- Ancryocephalus chiapanensis

Scientific classification
- Domain: Eukaryota
- Kingdom: Animalia
- Phylum: Platyhelminthes
- Class: Monogenea
- Order: Dactylogyridea
- Family: Ancyrocephalidae
- Genus: Ancyrocephalus; Creplin, 1839

Species
- See text

= Ancyrocephalus =

Genus of flatworms

Ancyrocephalus is a genus of flatworms belonging to the family Ancyrocephalidae.

The genus was first described by Creplin in 1839.

Species:

- Ancyrocephalus assimilis Gusev, 1955
- Ancyrocephalus atherinae Price, 1934
- Ancyrocephalus barilii Paperna, 1973
- Ancyrocephalus chakrabarti Gusev, 1976
- Ancyrocephalus chiapanensis Mendoza-Franco, Caspeta-Mandujano & Ramírez-Martínez, 2018
- Ancyrocephalus claveaui Birgi, 1988
- Ancyrocephalus cornutus Williams & Rogers, 1972
- Ancyrocephalus curtus Achmerow, 1952
- Ancyrocephalus esomi Gusev, 1963
- Ancyrocephalus forceps (Leuckart, 1858)
- Ancyrocephalus gussevi Dontsov, 1972
- Ancyrocephalus hangchowensis Wu, 1963
- Ancyrocephalus hemibarbi Achmerow, 1952
- Ancyrocephalus hoffmani Gusev, 1985
- Ancyrocephalus kamegaii Gusev, 1985
- Ancyrocephalus macrogaster Yamaguti, 1953
- Ancyrocephalus manilensis Tubangui, 1931
- Ancyrocephalus mogurndae (Yamaguti, 1940)
- Ancyrocephalus ogawai Gusev, 1985
- Ancyrocephalus ornatus Yamaguti, 1968
- Ancyrocephalus paradoxus Creplin, 1839
- Ancyrocephalus parspinicirrus Mamaev, 1970
- Ancyrocephalus parupenei Yamaguti, 1968
- Ancyrocephalus parvus Linton, 1940
- Ancyrocephalus pauu Yamaguti, 1968
- Ancyrocephalus pavlovskyi Gusev, 1955
- Ancyrocephalus percae Ergens, 1966
- Ancyrocephalus polymorphus Gusev, 1955
- Ancyrocephalus pseudorasborae Achmerow, 1952
- Ancyrocephalus pseudorhombi Tripathi, 1959
- Ancyrocephalus rarus Vijaya Raju, 1978
- Ancyrocephalus salinus Paperna, 1964
- Ancyrocephalus skrjabini Gusev, 1955
- Ancyrocephalus subaequalis Achmerow, 1952
- Ancyrocephalus trullae Williams, 1980
- Ancyrocephalus tylosuri (MacCallum, 1917) Johnston & Tiegs, 1922
- Ancyrocephalus unicirrus Tripathi, 1959
- Ancyrocephalus vesiculosus Murray, 1931
- Ancyrocephalus visakhapatnamensis Vijaya Raju, 1978
