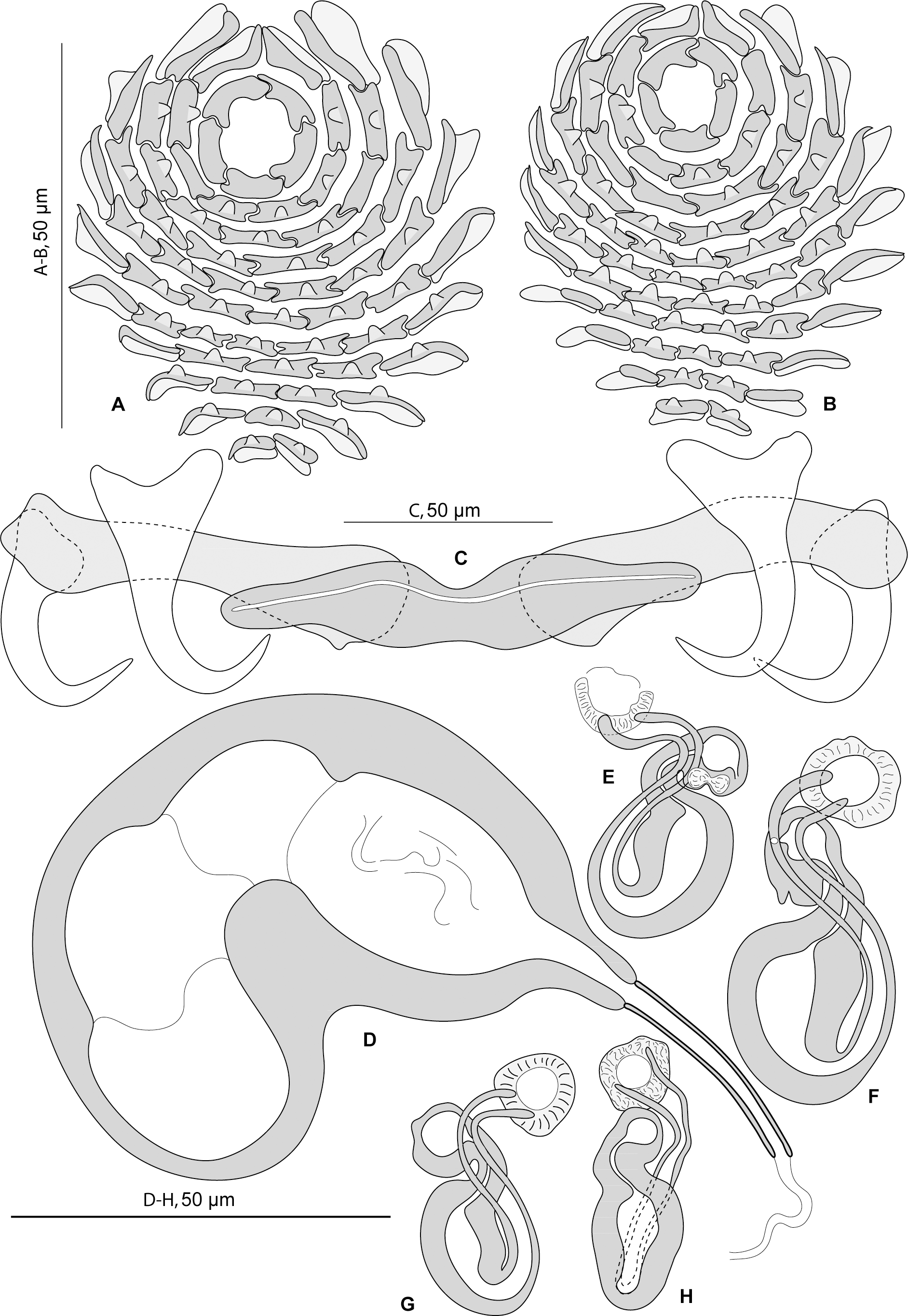
- Pseudorhabdosynochus sosia, sclerotised parts: squamodiscs and haptoral parts on top, male and female parts on bottom

Scientific classification
- Kingdom: Animalia
- Phylum: Platyhelminthes
- Class: Monogenea
- Order: Dactylogyridea
- Family: Diplectanidae
- Genus: Pseudorhabdosynochus
- Species: P. sosia

Binomial name
- Pseudorhabdosynochus sosia Neifar & Euzet, 2007

= Pseudorhabdosynochus sosia =

Species of flatworm

Pseudorhabdosynochus sosia is a diplectanid monogenean parasitic on the gills of groupers. It has been described in 2007 by Lassad Neifar & Louis Euzet. According to Neifar & Euzet, the name of the species refers to Sosia, who in Plautus' comedy Amphitryon confronts his double, and to the resemblance of the vagina of P. sosia to that of P. beverleyburtonae.

The species has been redescribed by Chaabane, Neifar, Gey & Justine in 2016.

== Description ==
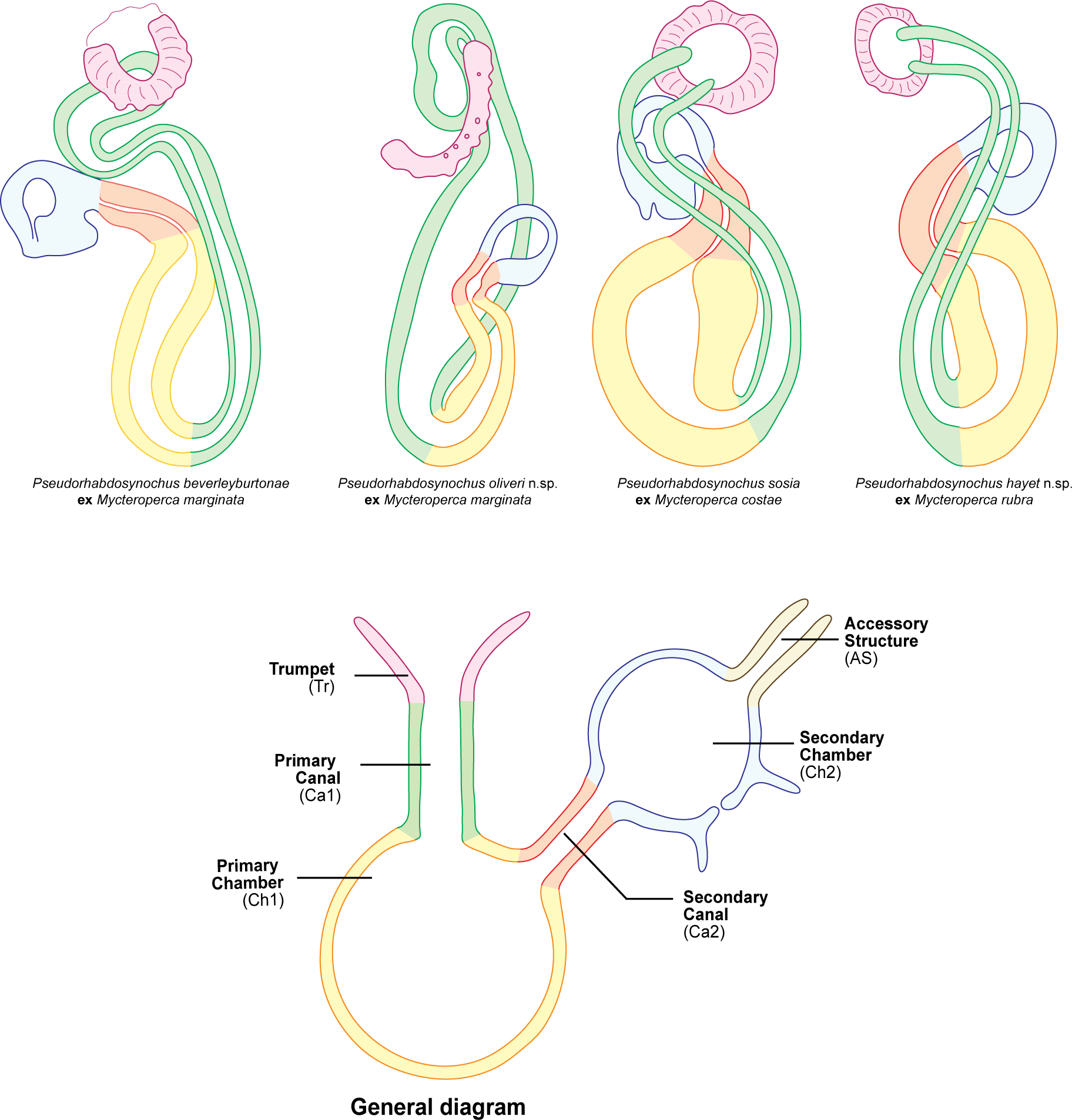
Pseudorhabdosynochus species of the beverleyburtonae group - homologies of vaginae

Pseudorhabdosynochus sosia is a small monogenean. The species has the general characteristics of other species of Pseudorhabdosynochus, with a flat body and a posterior haptor, which is the organ by which the monogenean attaches itself to the gill of is host. The haptor bears two squamodiscs, one ventral and one dorsal. The sclerotized male copulatory organ, or "quadriloculate organ", has the shape of a bean with four internal chambers, as in other species of Pseudorhabdosynochus. The vagina includes a sclerotized part, which is a complex structure.

Pseudorhabdosynochus sosia was redescribed from Museum specimens and new collections from off Tunisia by Chaabane, Neifar, Gey & Justine, who proposed to erect a "beverleyburtonae group" for species who share common characteristics with it, including similar sclerotised vaginae and squamodiscs, and host groupers belonging to the genus Mycteroperca in the Mediterranean and the eastern Atlantic. These species are P. beverleyburtonae (Oliver, 1984) Kritsky & Beverley-Burton, 1986, P. sosia, P. hayet Chaabane, Neifar, Gey & Justine, 2016 and P. oliveri Chaabane, Neifar, Gey & Justine, 2016.

== Hosts and localities ==
The goldblotch grouper Mycteroperca costae is the type-host of Pseudorhabdosynochus sosia. The type-locality is the Mediterranean Sea off Tunisia; off Dakar, Senegal, is an additional locality.
