= Amphibdellatidae =

Scientific classification
- Kingdom: Animalia
- Phylum: Platyhelminthes
- Class: Monogenea
- Order: Dactylogyridea
- Family: Amphibdellatidae; Carus, 1885

Family of flatworms

Amphibdellatidae is a family of parasitic flatworms belonging to the order Dactylogyridea. It is known to infect species of electric rays.

Genera:

- Amphibdella Chatin, 1874
- Amphibdelloides Price, 1937
