= Neotetraonchus =

Scientific classification
- Kingdom: Animalia
- Phylum: Platyhelminthes
- Class: Monogenea
- Order: Dactylogyridea
- Family: Neotetraonchidae; Bravo-Hollis, 1968
- Genus: Neotetraonchus; Bravo-Hollis, 1968

Genus of flatworms

Neotetraonchus is a genus of flatworms belonging to the monotypic family Neotetraonchidae.

The species of this genus are found in Central America.

Species:

- Neotetraonchus bravohollisae Paperna, 1977
- Neotetraonchus bravohollisi Paperna, 1977
- Neotetraonchus bychowskyi Bravo-Hollis, 1968
- Neotetraonchus felis (Hargis, 1955) Paperna, 1977
- Neotetraonchus proops (Zambrano & Añez, 1993) Domingues, Soares & Watana
- Neotetraonchus proops Zambrano & Añez, 1993
- Neotetraonchus vegrandis Kritsky, Mendoza-Franco, Bullard & Vidal-Martínez
