= Neocalceostomatidae =

Scientific classification
- Kingdom: Animalia
- Phylum: Platyhelminthes
- Class: Monogenea
- Order: Dactylogyridea
- Family: Neocalceostomatidae; Lim, 1995

Family of flatworms

Neocalceostomatidae is a family of flatworms belonging to the order Dactylogyridea.

Genera:

- Neocalceostoma Tripathi, 1959
- Neocalceostomoides Kritsky, Mizelle & Bilqees, 1978
- Thysanotohaptor Kritsky, Shameem, Kumari & Krishnaveni, 2012
