= Tetraonchidae =

Scientific classification
- Kingdom: Animalia
- Phylum: Platyhelminthes
- Class: Monogenea
- Order: Dactylogyridea
- Family: Tetraonchidae; Monticelli, 1903

Family of flatworms

Tetraonchidae is a family of flatworms belonging to the order Dactylogyridea.

Genera:

- Ergenstrema Paperna, 1964
- Tetraonchus Diesing, 1858
