= Pseudodactylogyridae =

Scientific classification
- Kingdom: Animalia
- Phylum: Platyhelminthes
- Class: Monogenea
- Order: Dactylogyridea
- Family: Pseudodactylogyridae

Family of flatworms

Pseudodactylogyridae is a family of flatworms belonging to the order Dactylogyridea.

== Genera ==
Genera:

- Peudodiclidophora Yamaguti, 1965
- Pseudodactylogyrus Gusev, 1965
- Pseudodiclidophora Yamaguti, 1965
