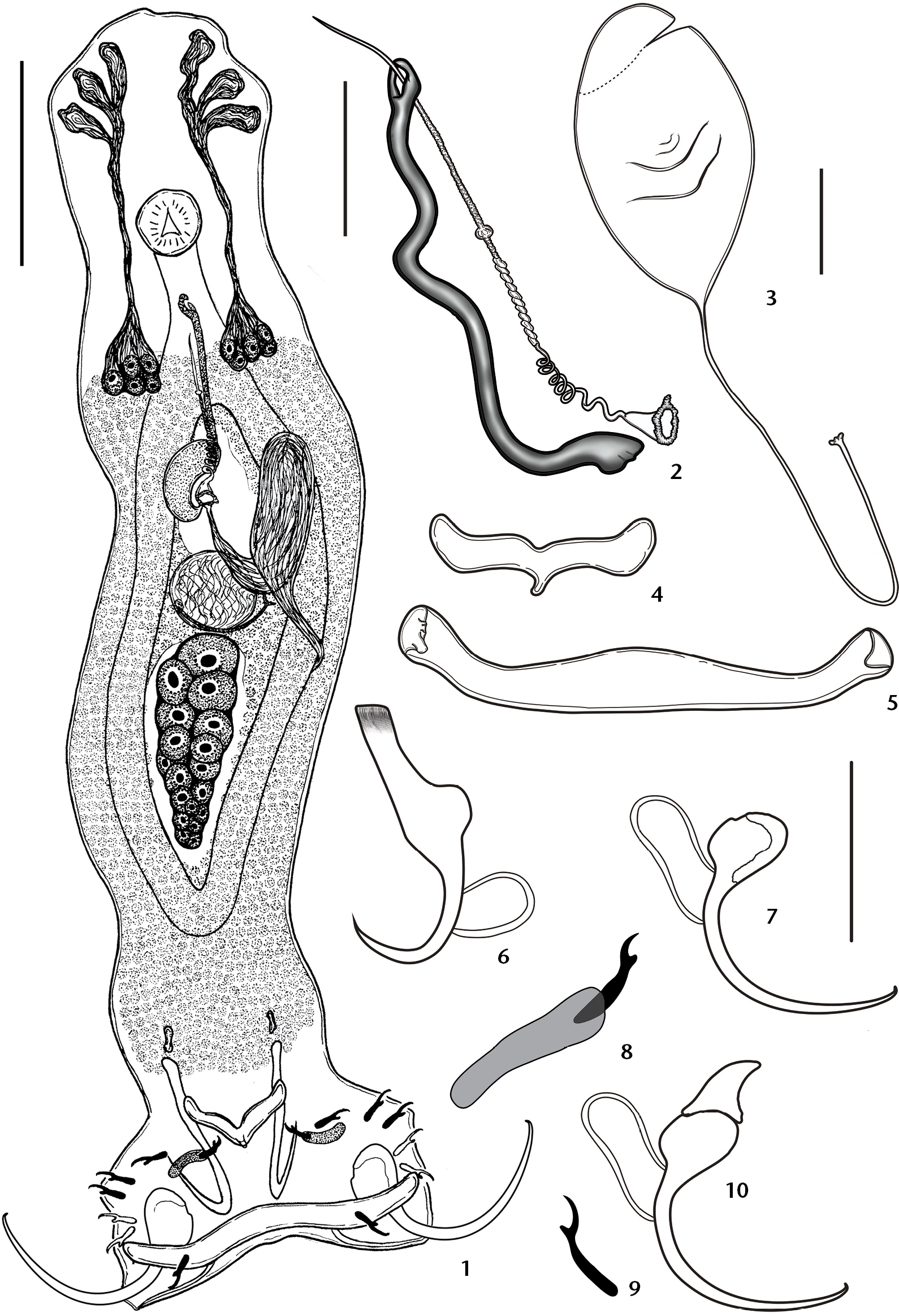
- Unilatus humboldtii: (1) body in ventral face (composite); (2) copulatory complex; (3) egg; (4) anterior bar; (5) posterior bar; (6) anterior anchor; (7) posterior anchor; (8) hook pair 1; (9) hook pairs 2–7; (10) posterior anchor. Scale bars: 1 = 50 μm scale, 2–10 = 25 μm.

Scientific classification
- Kingdom: Animalia
- Phylum: Platyhelminthes
- Class: Monogenea
- Order: Dactylogyridea
- Family: Ancylodiscoididae; Gusev, 1961

= Ancylodiscoididae =

Family of worms

Ancylodiscoididae is a family of parasitic flatworms belonging to the order Dactylogyridea.

== Genera ==
Genera:

- Anchylodiscus Johnston & Tiegs, 1922
- Ancylodiscoides Yamaguti, 1937
- Bagrobdella Paperna, 1969
- Bifurcohaptor Jain, 1958
- Bychowskyella Akhmerov, 1952
- Chauhanellus Bychowsky & Nagibina, 1969
- Cornudiscoides Kulkarni, 1969
- Demidospermus Suriano, 1983
- Hamatopeduncularia Yamaguti, 1953
- Malayanodiscoides Lim & Furtado, 1986
- Mizelleus Jain, 1957
- Neobychowskyella Ma, Wang, & Li, 1983
- Notopterodiscoides Lim & Furtado, 1986
- Pangasitrema Pariselle, Euzet, & Lambert, 2004
- Paraquadriacanthus Ergens, 1988
- Pavanelliella Kritsky & Boeger, 1998
- Philureter Viozzi & Gutiérrez, 2001
- Protoancylodiscoides Paperna, 1969
- Pseudoancylodiscoides Yamaguti, 1963
- Quadriacanthus Paperna, 1961
- Schilbetrema Paperna & Thurston, 1968
- Schilbetrematoides Kritsky & Kulo, 1992
- Silurodactylogyrus Ghosh, Chandra, & Saha, 2003
- Synodontella Dossou & Euzet, 1993
- Thaparocleidus Jain, 1952
- Trinigyrus Hanek, Molnár, & Fernando, 1974
- Unibarra Suriano & Incorvaia, 1995
- Unilatus Mizelle & Kritsky, 1967
