= Protogyrodactylidae =

Scientific classification
- Kingdom: Animalia
- Phylum: Platyhelminthes
- Class: Monogenea
- Order: Dactylogyridea
- Family: Protogyrodactylidae; Johnston & Tiegs, 1922

Family of flatworms

Protogyrodactylidae is a family of flatworms belonging to the order Dactylogyridea.

Genera:

- Protogyrodactylus Johnston & Tiegs, 1922
- Trivitellina Johnston & Tiegs, 1922
