= Calceostomatidae =

Scientific classification
- Kingdom: Animalia
- Phylum: Platyhelminthes
- Class: Monogenea
- Order: Dactylogyridea
- Family: Calceostomatidae; Parona & Perugia, 1890

Family of flatworms

Calceostomatidae is a family of flatworms belonging to the order Dactylogyridea.

Genera:

- Bychowskya Nagibina, 1968
- Calceostoma Van Beneden, 1858
- Dicrumenia Mamaev, 1969
- Ktariella Vala & Euzet, 1977
- Paracalceostoma Caballero y Caballero & Bravo-Hollis, 1960
