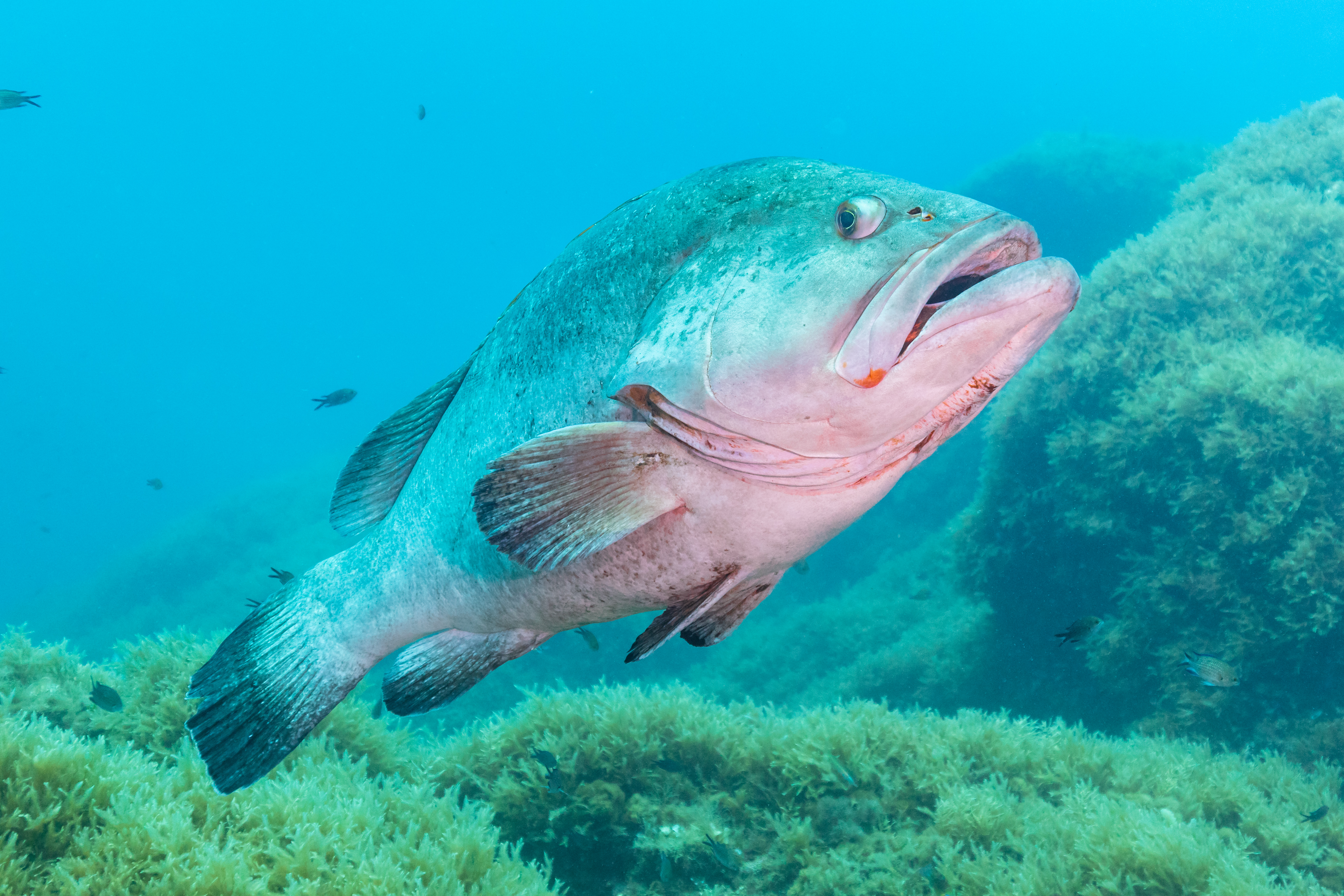

Conservation status
- Vulnerable (IUCN 3.1)

Scientific classification
- Kingdom: Animalia
- Phylum: Chordata
- Class: Actinopterygii
- Order: Perciformes
- Family: Epinephelidae
- Genus: Epinephelus
- Species: E. marginatus

Binomial name
- Epinephelus marginatus (Lowe, 1834)

Synonyms
- List: Serranus marginatus Lowe, 1834; Perca gigas Brünnich, 1768; Cerna gigas (Brünnich, 1768); Epinephelus gigas (Brünnich, 1768); Holocentrus gigas (Brünnich, 1768); Serranus gigas (Brünnich, 1768); Serranus fimbriatus Lowe, 1838; Serranus aspersus Jenyns, 1840; Cernua gigas Costa, 1849; Serranus cernioides de Brito Capello, 1867; Epinephelus brachysoma Cope, 1871

= Epinephelus marginatus =

Species of fish

Epinephelus marginatus (Latin pronunciation: [epiːˈnepʰelus marɡiˈnaːtus]), the dusky grouper, yellowbelly rock cod, or yellowbelly grouper, is a species of fish in the grouper family, Epinephelidae. It is found in coastal waters, primarily at the edges of the Atlantic Ocean – off western Africa and eastern South America – and also in the Indian Ocean around South Africa, Madagascar and Réunion, and throughout the Mediterranean.

== Taxonomy ==
Epinephelus marginatus was first formally described as Serranus marginatus in 1834 by the English botanist, ichthyologist, malacologist and clergyman Richard Thomas Lowe (1802–1874) with the type locality given as "off Madeira". The name Perca gigas was coined by the Danish zoologist Morten Thrane Brünnich (1737–1827) in 1768 but was unused and some authorities are of the view that this name should be suppressed by the International Commission on Zoological Nomenclature.

== Distribution ==
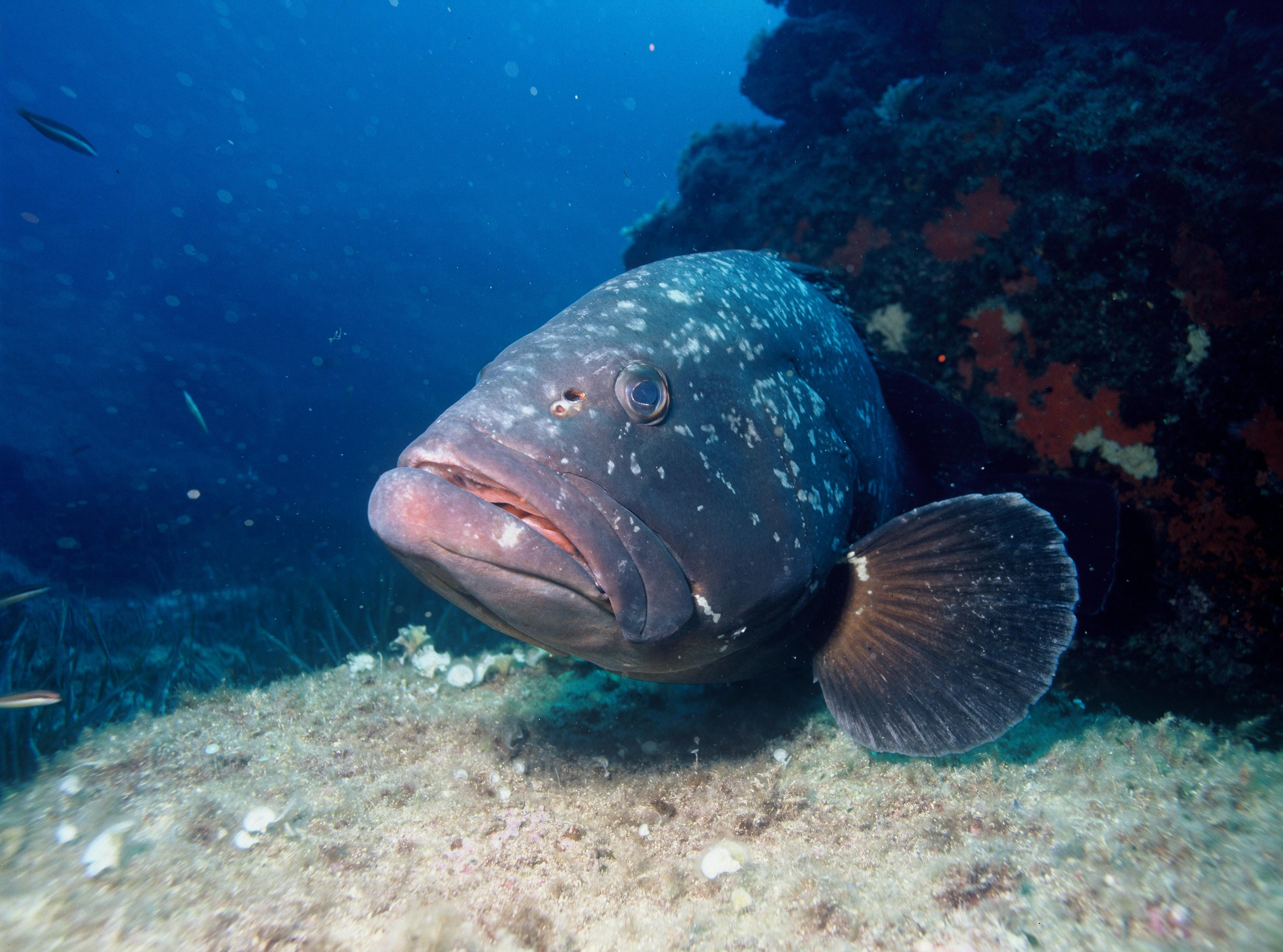
Epinephelus marginatus in the Mediterranean

Epinephelus marginatus has two disjunct distribution centres; the main one is in the eastern Atlantic from the west coast of Iberia south along the western coast of Africa to the Cape of Good Hope, extending east into the south-western Indian Ocean, as far as southern Mozambique, with doubtful records from Madagascar and possibly Oman. It is found throughout the Mediterranean, too. The second population occurs in the south western Atlantic off the coast of South America in southern Brazil, Uruguay and northern Argentina. In the eastern Atlantic, it is not normally found further north than Portugal but rare occurrences have been reported from the Bay of Biscay and in the English Channel as far north as northern France, Great Britain, and Ireland.

== Description ==
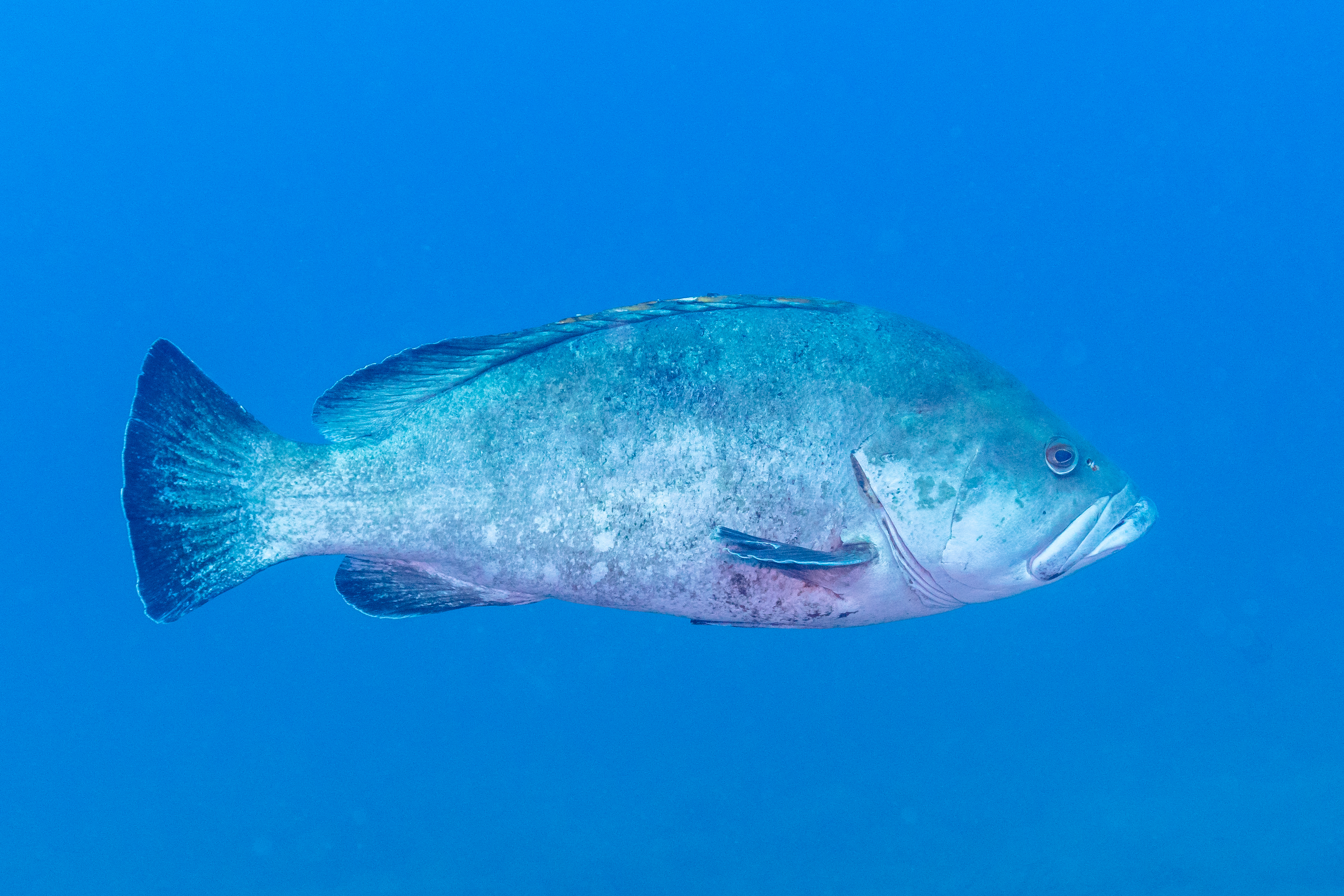
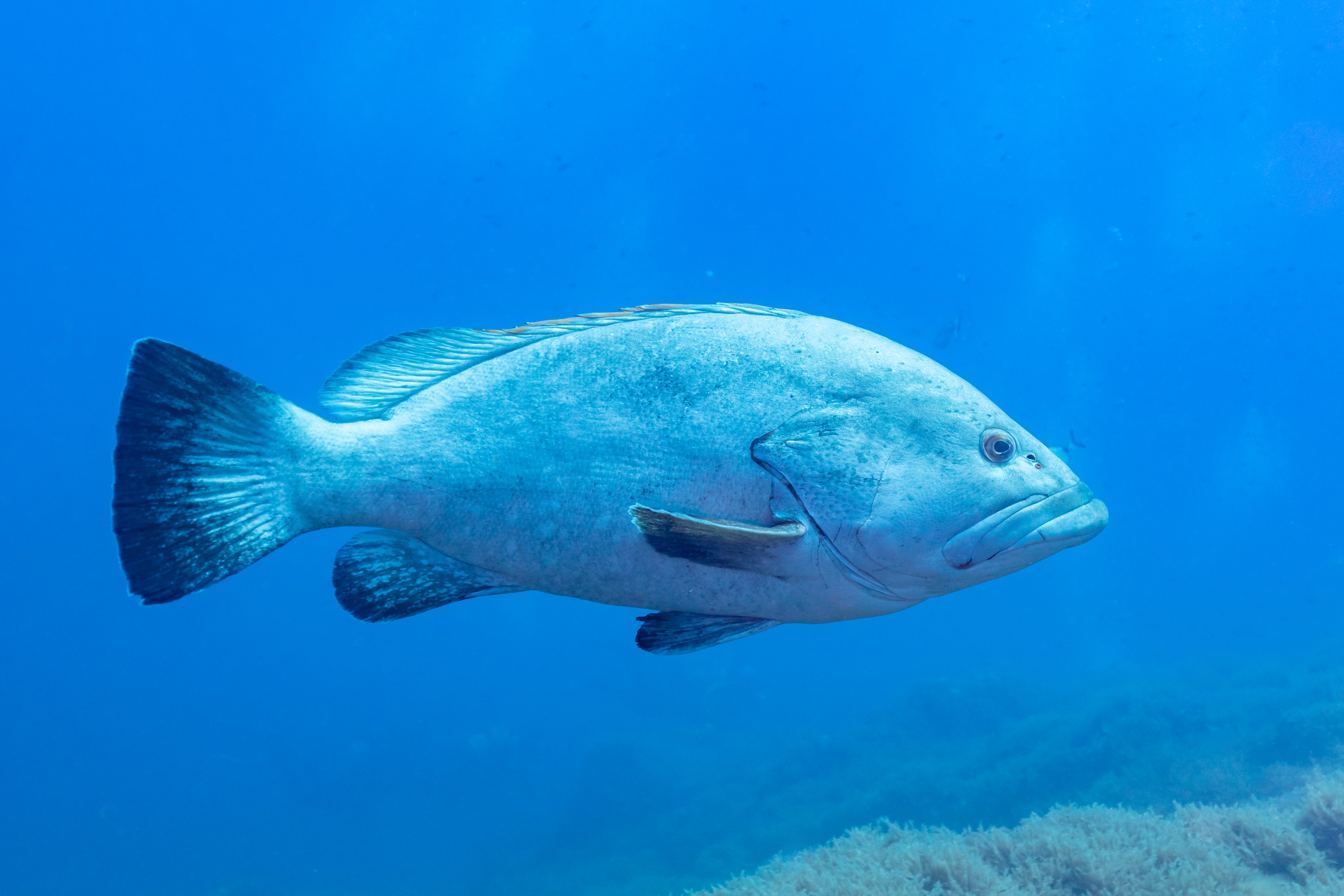
Dusky groupers at Cape Palos, Spain

Epinephelus marginatus is a very large, oval-bodied, large-headed fish with a wide mouth, which has a protruding lower jaw. Eleven spines and 13–16 soft rays are in the dorsal fin. This species can grow up to 150 cm (59 in) in standard length, but is more commonly 90 cm (35 in).

The head and upper body are coloured dark reddish brown or greyish, usually with yellowish gold countershading on the ventral surfaces; the base colour is marked by a vertical series of irregular pale greenish-yellow or silvery-grey or whitish blotching, which is normally rather conspicuous on the body and head; the black maxillary streak varies in its markedness; dark brown median fins; distal edges of the anal and caudal fins and also often pectoral fins have narrow white terminal bands; the pelvic fins are black towards their tips, while the pectoral fins are dark reddish-brown or grey; the margin of spiny dorsal fin and basal part of the pectoral fins are often golden yellow in colour.

== Habitat ==
Epinephelus marginatus is demersal, normally found in and around rocky reefs from surface waters down to as much as 300 metres (980 ft) in depth. It often occurs in the vicinity of beds of Posidonia sea grass. Juveniles are generally found more inshore than the adult fish, even being found in rock pools. Where they are protected, in marine nature reserves and no-take zones, both adults and juveniles occur in shallow waters, but the depths at which juveniles are found is always shallower than the usual depths of adults.

== Biology ==
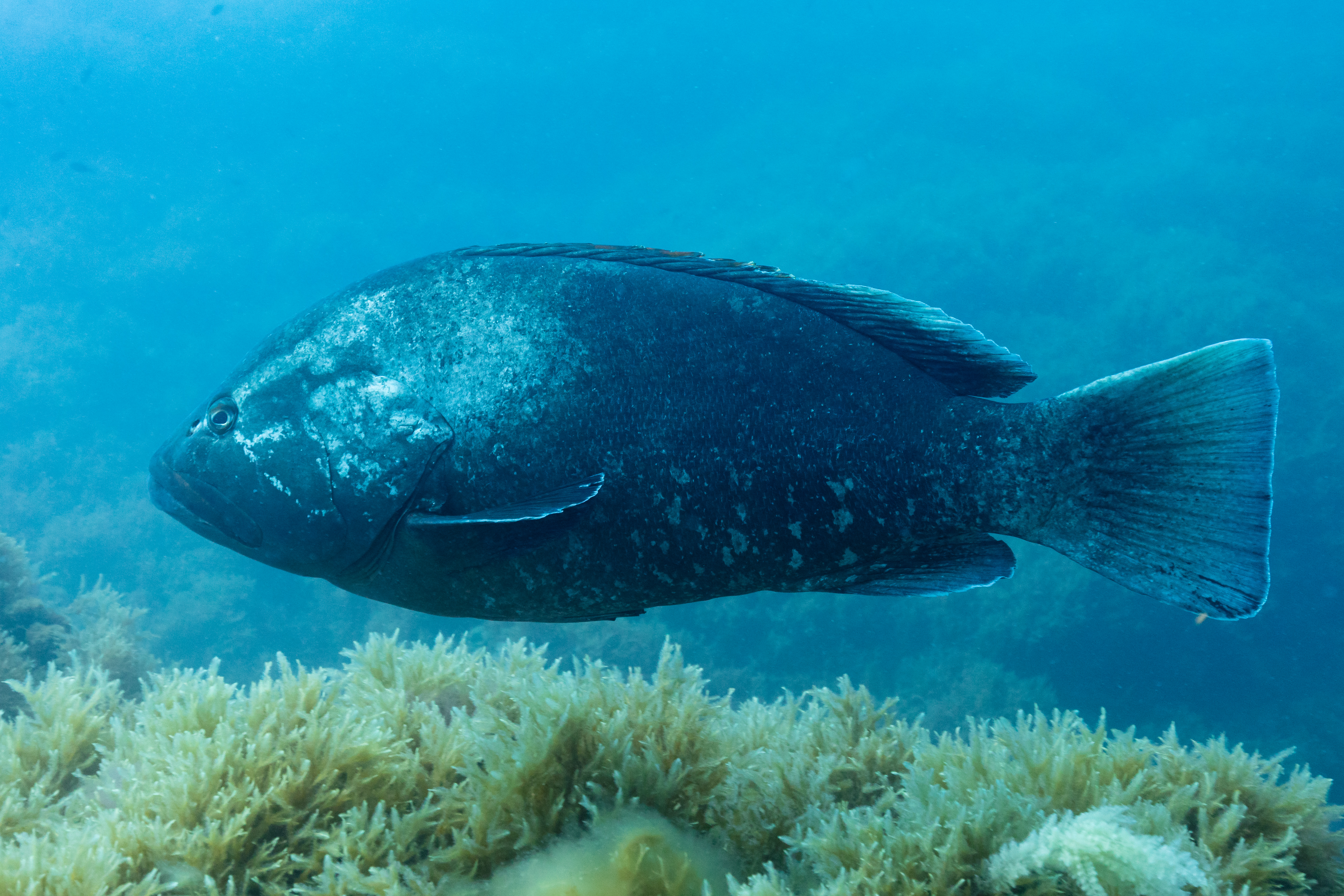
A silver-streaked colour pattern may be sported by large dominant males. At Cape Palos, Spain

Epinephelus marginatus adults are solitary and territorial, preferring areas with a rocky substrate, but both adults and juveniles enter brackish waters, such as estuaries. Their main foods are molluscs, crustaceans, and octopuses. As E. marginatus grows larger, other fishes form an increasingly important part of their diet, with reef fish being preferred.

=== Reproduction ===
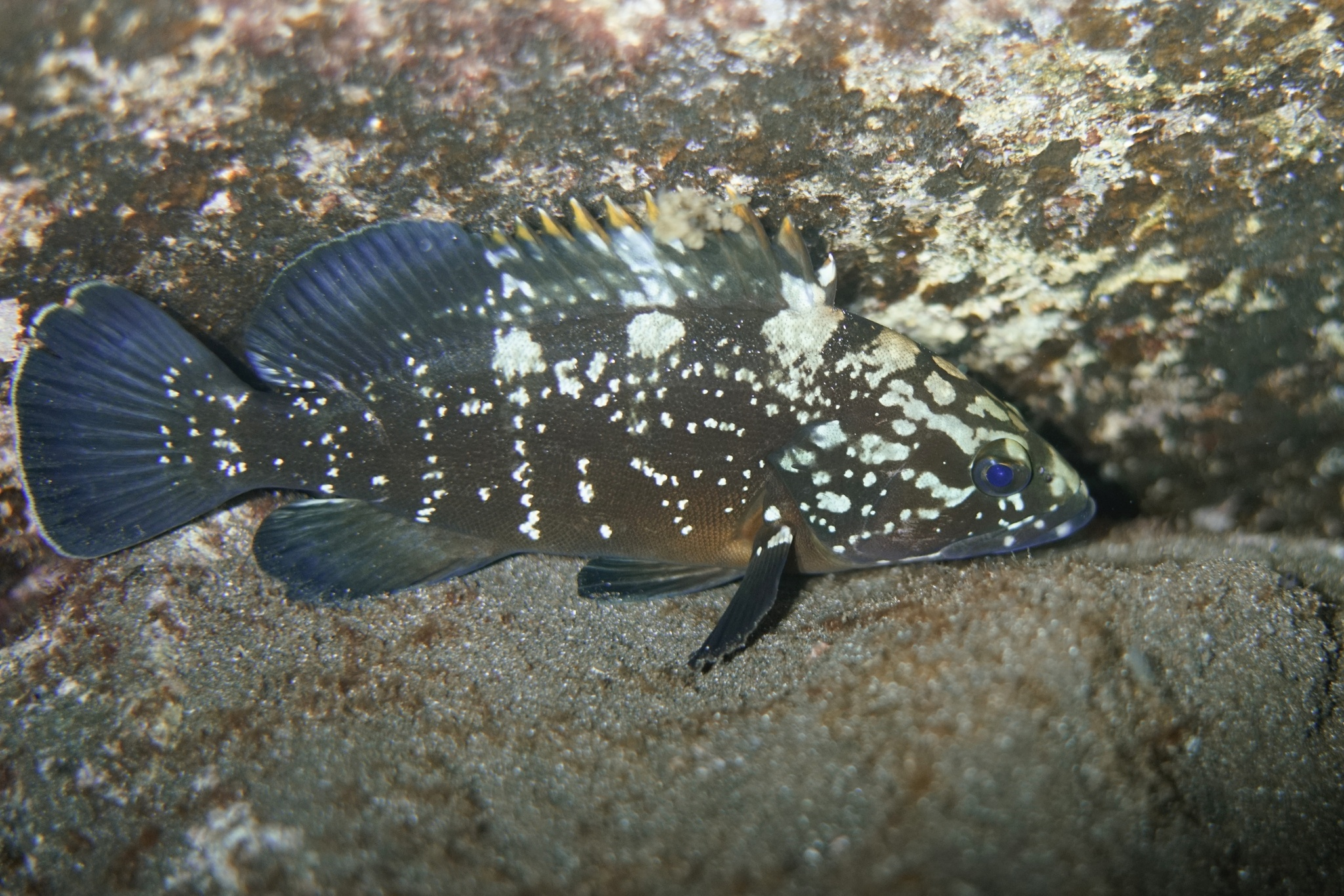
Juvenile, at Tenerife

E. marginatus is a protogynous hermaphrodite, meaning that all fish begin adult life as females, but as they grow larger and older, they develop into males. They attain sexual maturity at quite a late age; females begin to breed when they are around five years of age, and then between their 9th and 16th years, they change into males, most commonly at age 12. The fish start to transform into males at a length of 65 cm (26 in), although most change sex when they are between 80 and 90 cm (31 and 35 in) in total length. In some populations, the presence of large female fish suggests that not all females change sex.

During the breeding season, small clusters of a few tens of individuals form at specific spawning sites, an exception to their normally solitary existence. Known sites where E. marginatus traditionally gathers to spawn include the Medes Islands Marine Reserve in Spain, off Lampedusa in Italy, and Port-Cros National Park in France, all in the Mediterranean; fishermen in Brazil suspect aggregations occur off the coast of Santa Catarina, but so far, none has been found. In the Mediterranean, spawning lasts from June to September, mating is polygynous, and the spawning clusters normally have seven females to each male. Off Brazil, E. marginatus reproduces in the early summer, between November and December. While spawning, the dominant males set up territories and aggressively defend them from neighbouring males and smaller females. They are reported to live for up to 50 years.

== Fishing ==
Epinephelus marginatus is a popular food fish and is caught across its range by commercial fishermen, while large adult fish are targeted as trophies by spear fishing, and are readily taken by anglers. The slow growth rate of this species and its particular mode of reproduction make it vulnerable to overexploitation; for example, the targeting of large males by spear fishers may skew the sex ratio even further and affect reproductive productivity. Attempts to grow and breed this fish in aquaculture have been made in Italy.

In some countries, the dusky grouper is considered a delicacy. Referring to its preference among restaurant guests, the Spanish say "De la mar el mero y de la tierra el carnero" (From the sea the dusky grouper, from the land the lamb).

== Conservation ==
Epinephelus marginatus catch declined by 88% in seven countries between 1990 and 2001; these countries form a significant part of its overall distribution. In other regions, such as West Africa, where this species is heavily exploited, few data about the status of this fish are available. For these reasons, the International Union for Conservation of Nature has assessed E. marginatus as being vulnerable, citing a suspected reduction in the population size in excess of 50% over the last three generations and with ongoing threats. Conservation measures have included a spearfishing ban for 10 years in France and bag limits in South Africa. In addition, several marine protected areas have been established to protect the habitat of E. marginatus. In Turkey, recommended actions have included no-take zones along the Aegean and Mediterranean Sea coasts and a total fisheries ban for a minimum of 3–5 years.

== External resources ==
- Photos of Epinephelus marginatus in the Sealife Collection
