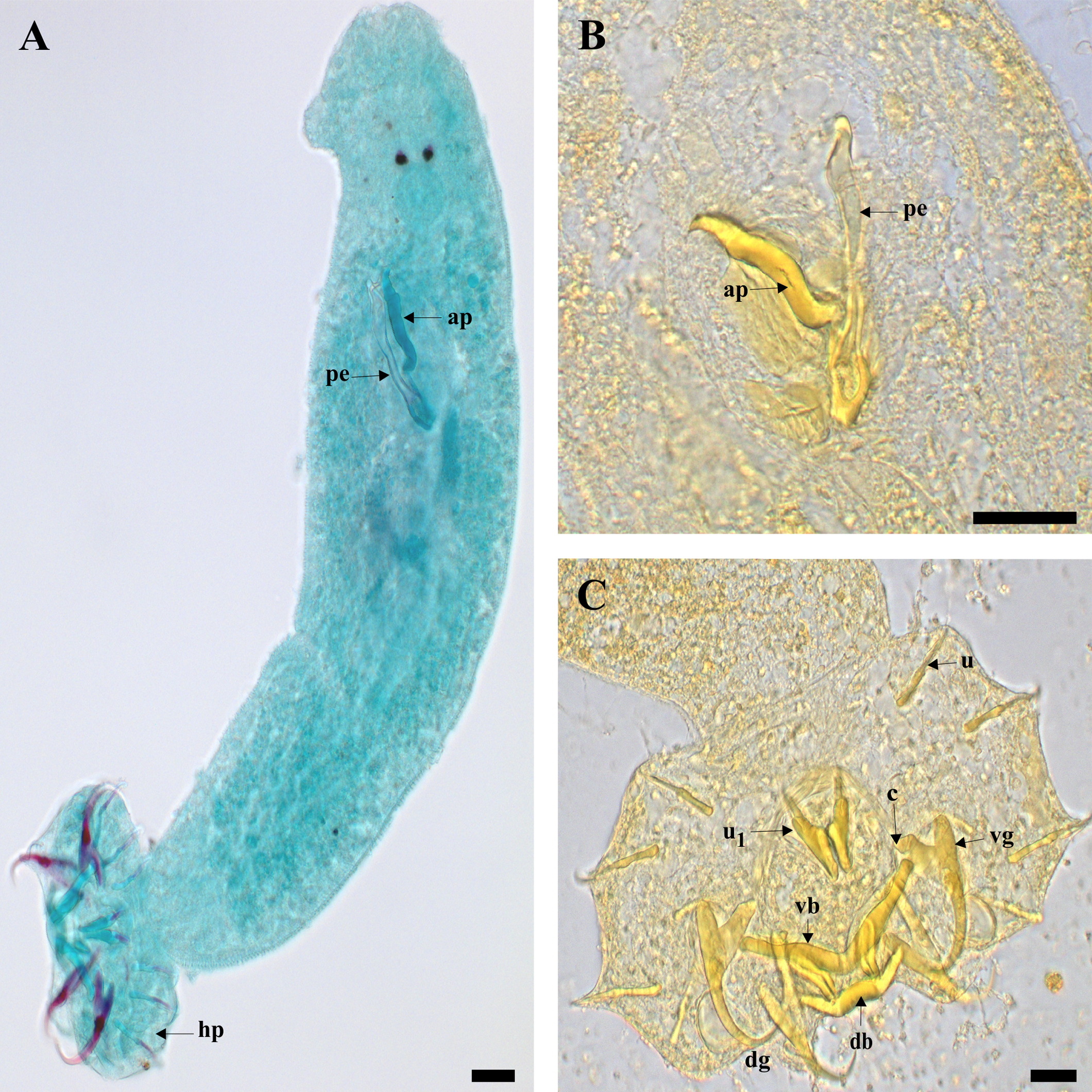
- Cichlidogyrus philander

Scientific classification
- Kingdom: Animalia
- Phylum: Platyhelminthes
- Class: Monogenea
- Subclass: Monopisthocotylea
- Order: Dactylogyridea

= Dactylogyridea =

Order of flatworms

Dactylogyridea is an order of parasitic flatworms in the class Monogenea.

== Families ==
- Amphibdellatidae Carus, 1885
- Ancylodiscoididae Gusev, 1961
- Ancyrocephalidae Bychowsky & Nagibina, 1968 ("temporary name")
- Calceostomatidae Parona & Perugia, 1890
- Dactylogyridae Bychowsky, 1933
- Diplectanidae Monticelli, 1903
- Fridericianellidae Gupta & Sachdeva, 1990
- Neocalceostomatidae Lim, 1995
- Neotetraonchidae Bravo-Hollis, 1968
- Protogyrodactylidae Johnston & Tiegs, 1922
- Pseudodactylogyridae
- Tetraonchidae Bychowsky, 1937
- Urogyridae Bilong Bilong, Birgi & Euzet, 1994
