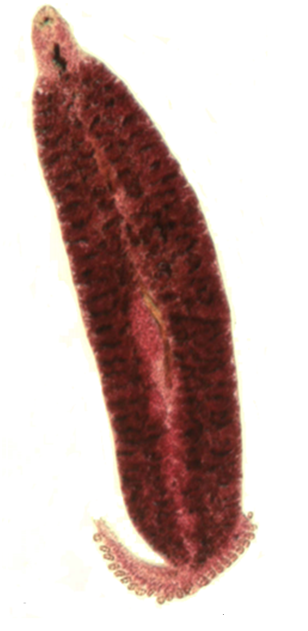
- Pseudaxine trachuri, body

Scientific classification
- Kingdom: Animalia
- Phylum: Platyhelminthes
- Class: Monogenea
- Order: Mazocraeidea
- Family: Gastrocotylidae
- Genus: Pseudaxine
- Species: P. trachuri

Binomial name
- Pseudaxine trachuri Parona & Perugia, 1890

Synonyms
- Axine trachuri (Palombi, 1949)

= Pseudaxine trachuri =

Species of worms

Pseudaxine trachuri is a species of monogenean, parasitic on the gills of a marine fish. It belongs to the family Gastrocotylidae.

== Systematics ==
Pseudaxine trachuri was first described and illustrated based on specimens from the gills of the Atlantic horse mackerel Trachurus trachurus (Carangidae) (referred to as Caranx trachurus in the original description) off Genova, Italy. Pseudaxine trachuri was designated the type species of the genus.

== Morphology ==
P. trachuri has the general morphology of all species of Pseudaxine, with a triangular body and an anterior extremity constricted at the level of buccal suckers in some species. The body comprises an anterior part which contains most organs and a posterior part called the haptor. The haptor is oblique and unilateral, and bears numerous clamps arranged in a single row. The clamps of the haptor attach the animal to the gill of the fish. The terminal lappet is present and bears two pairs of anchors. Also, two buccal suckers occur at the anterior extremity. The digestive organs include an anterior, terminal mouth, a pharynx, an oesophagus, and a posterior intestine with two lateral branches provided with numerous secondary branches. Each adult contains male and female reproductive organs. The reproductive organs include an anterior genital atrium, a penis with a corona of hooks, a single ovary, and a number of testes, which are posterior to the ovary.

Sequences of the species' 28S rDNA gene and cox1 gene have been published.

=== Asymmetry and attachment to the fish's gills ===
The haptor of P. trachuri may be on the right or on the left. The direction of asymmetry has been shown to depend upon the site of attachment on the host. In fact, the asymmetry of P. trachuri fulfills an important function, which is to bring the longitudinal axis of the body parallel to the gill-ventilating current. Llewellyn studied the adhesive attitude of P. trachuri and revealed that it attaches near to the distal ends of primary lamellae. In P. trachuri, the longitudinal axis of the body is inclined to the adhesive organs at an angle that varies between 30 and 50°. The adhesive organs are applied near the outer lateral borders of the narrow primary lamellae, and the body of the monogenean crosses the inner border of the lamellae. It bends through a right angle and the greater part of the body ends up between two hemibranchs. Sometimes, it bends through 180° so the body of P. trachuri comes in contact with the opposite side of the same lamellae to which its haptor is attached.

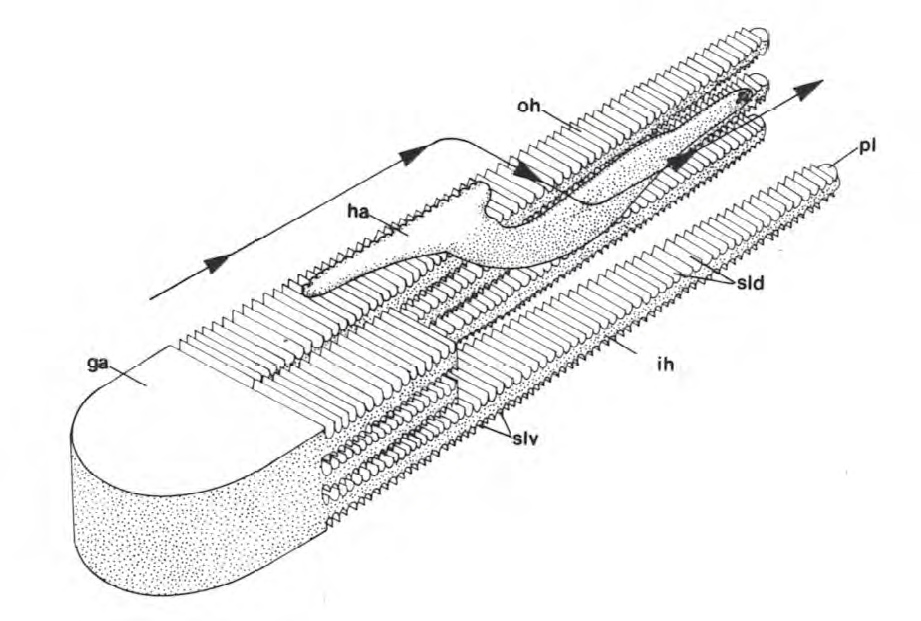
Drawing showing the adhesive attitude of Axine belones, a monogenean with an attachment mode similar to that of Pseudaxine trachuri

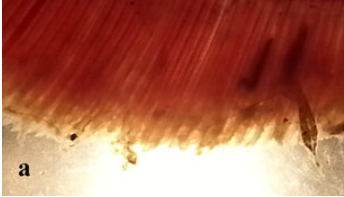
Pseudaxine trachuri attached to gill filaments of the Atlantic horse mackerel Trachurus trachurus, captured off Morocco, North Atlantic

=== Haptoral innervations ===
The haptoral innervations of P. trachuri is asymmetrical. The clamps are innervated from the main haptoral nerve. Among the Gastrocotylidae, P. trachuri is unique by the asymmetrical positions of the prehaptoral ganglia. The clamp-side prehaptoral ganglion is situated close to the anteriormost clamps, while the nonclamp side prehaptoral ganglion is situated near the terminal lappet. After the fusion of the main nerve trunks of the nonclamp side, some prominent nerves arise to innervate the lappet. The innervation is different from that of Gastrocotyle trachuri. This is probably due to the attitude of clamps formation of P. trachuri, that occur in a posteroanterior direction, thus, the “prehaptoral” ganglion moves more anteriorly, close to the anteriormost clamps.

=== Gallery of images ===
P. trachuri, different body parts

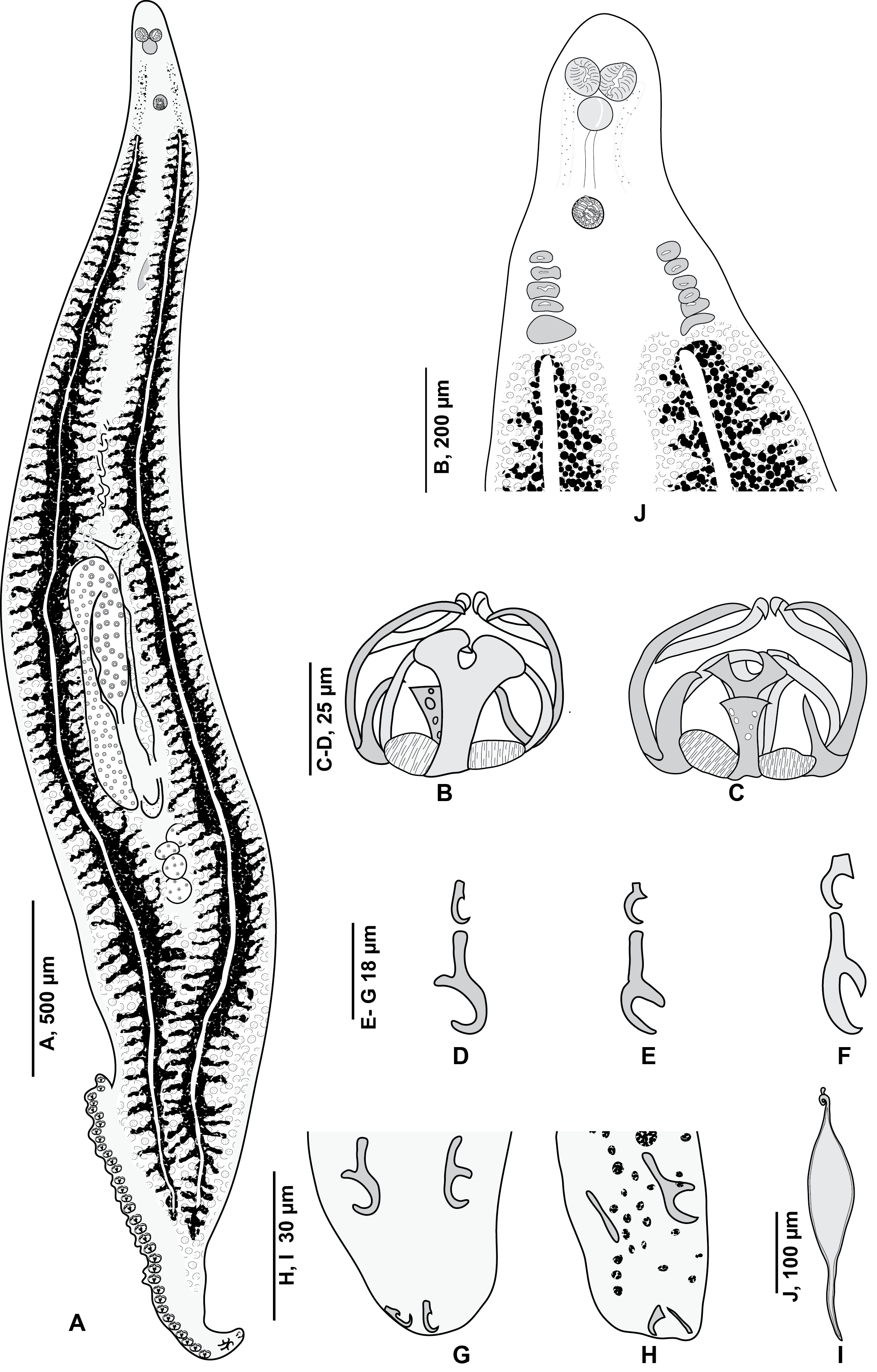
Drawings of body

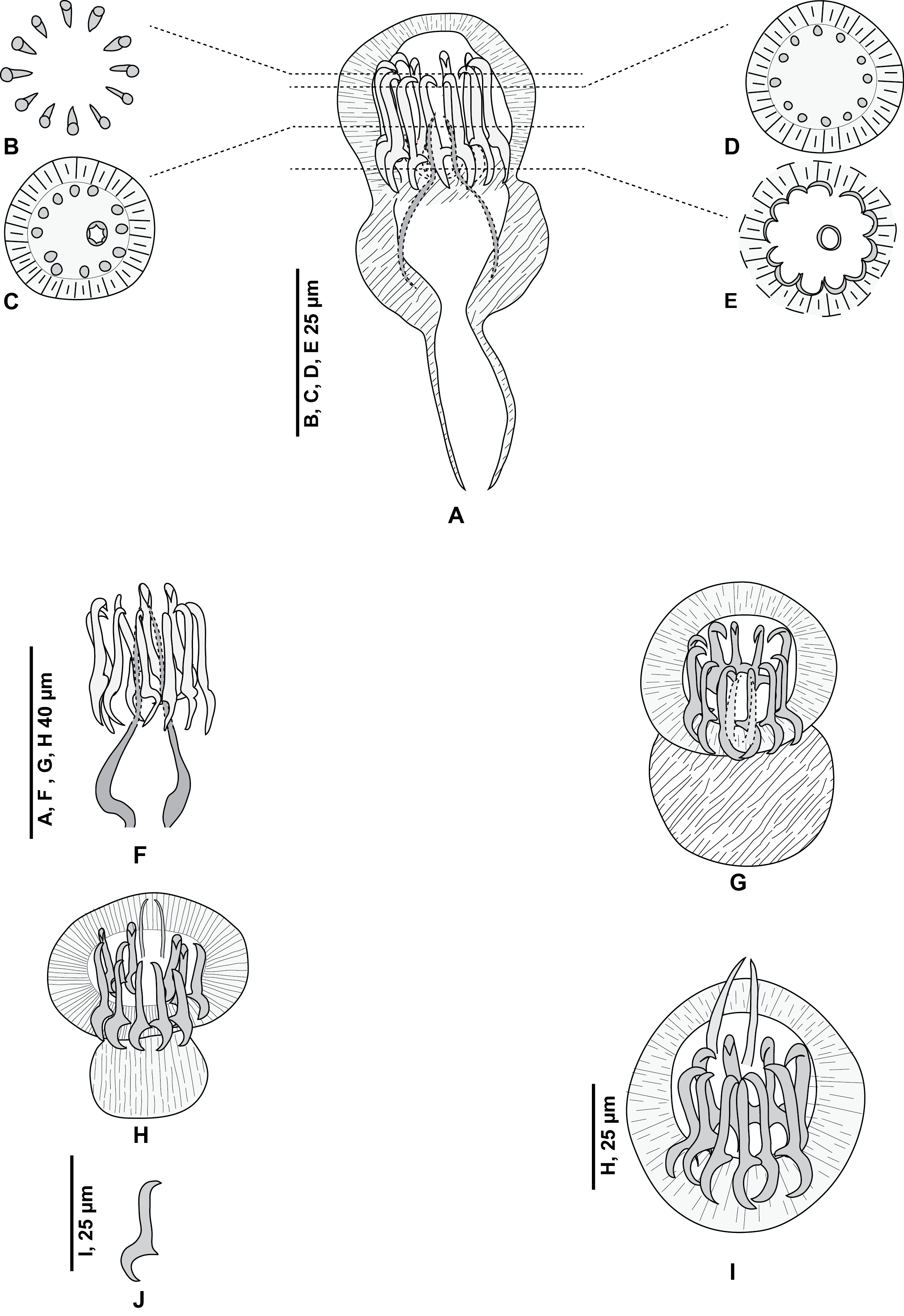
Drawings of male copulatory organ

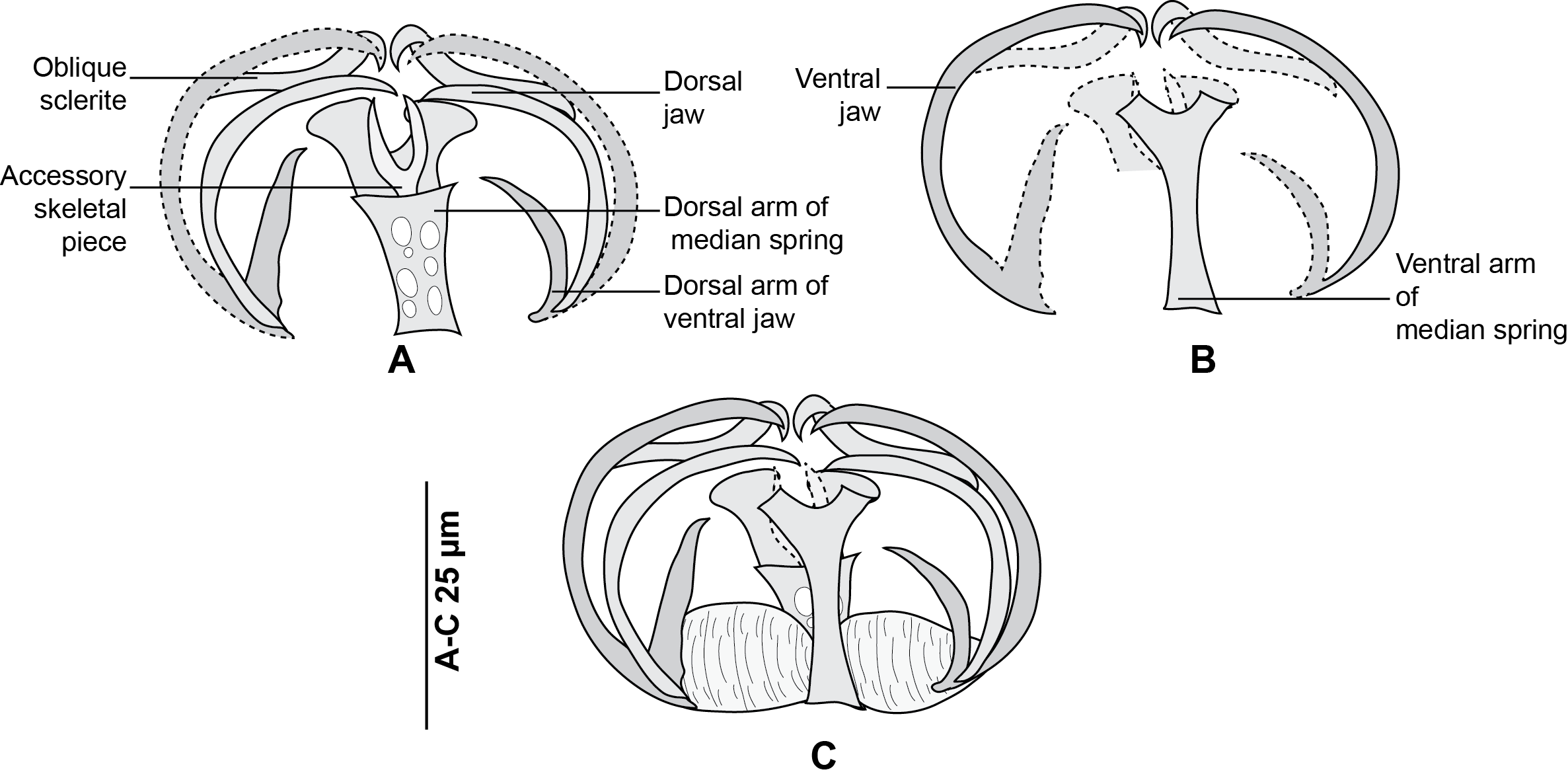
Drawings of clamps

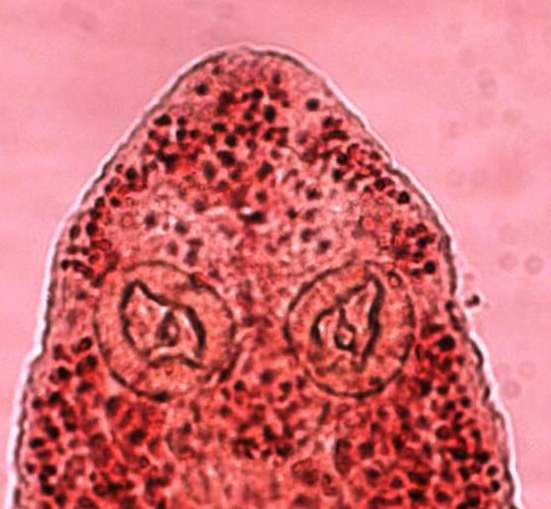
Buccal suckers

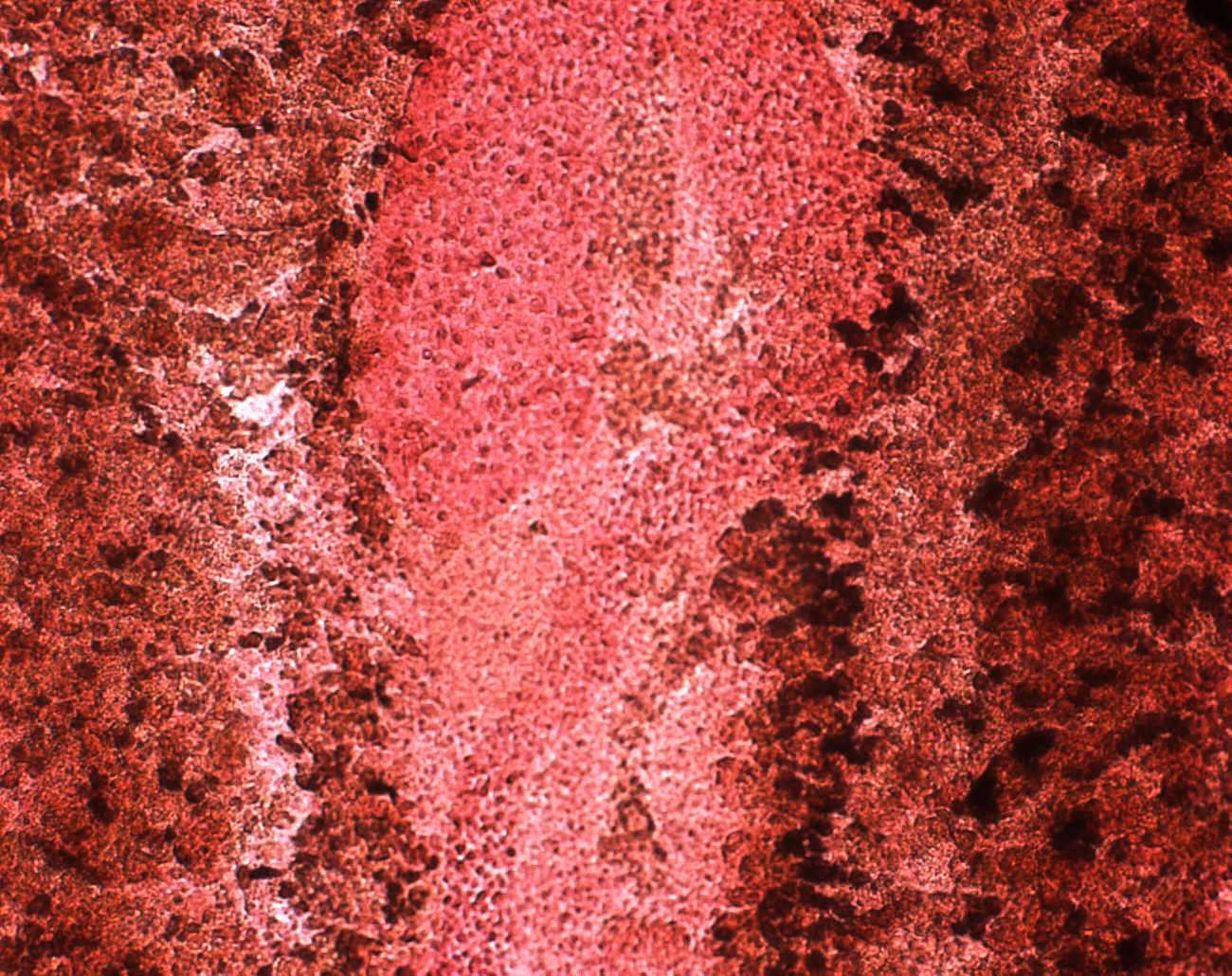
Ovary

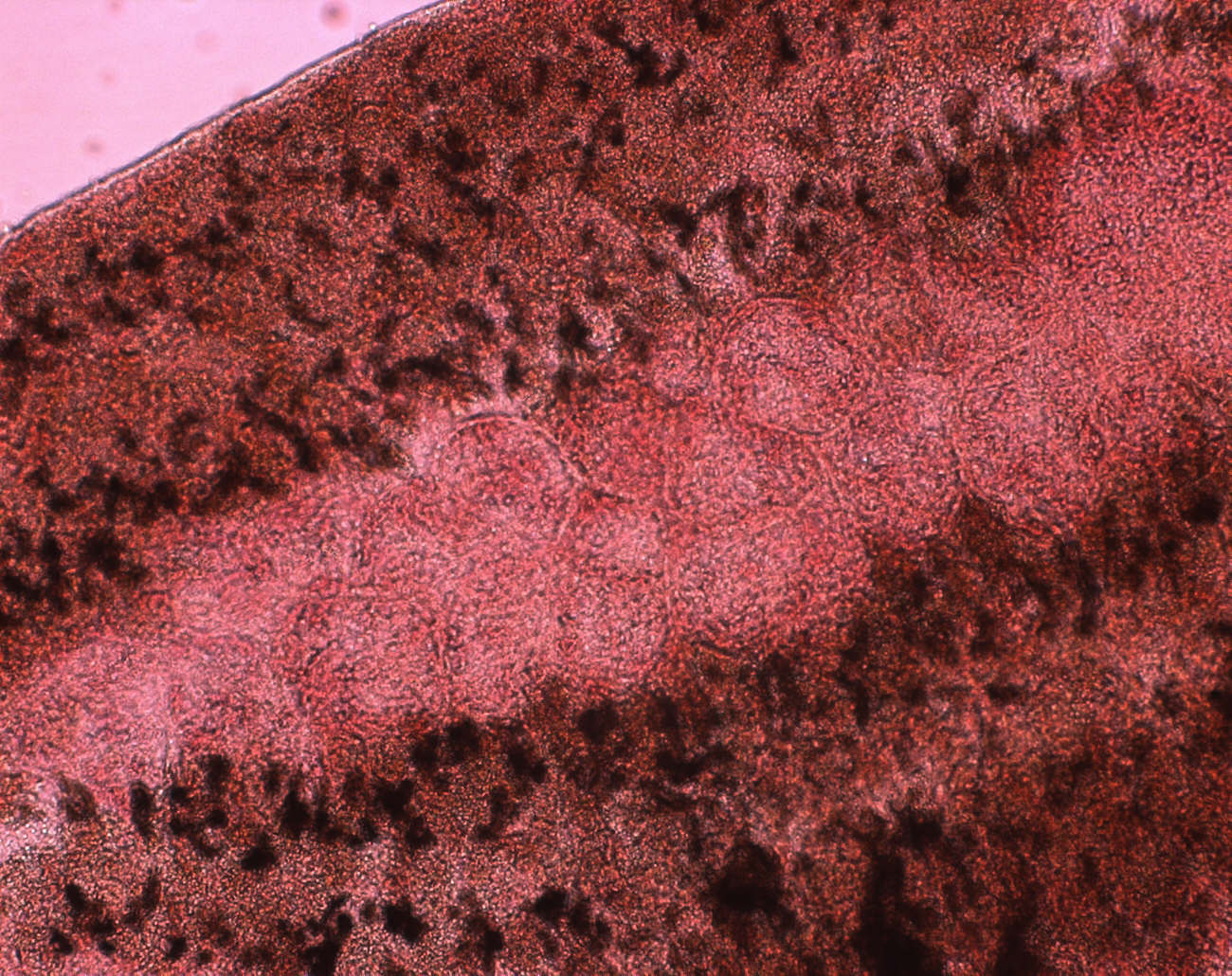
Testes

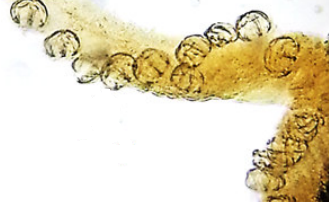
Clamps

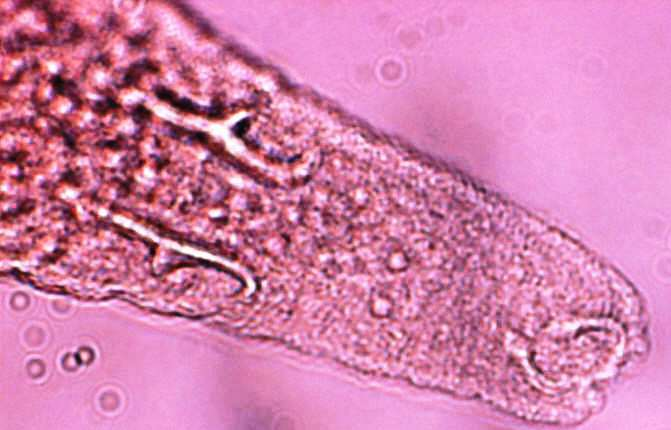
Terminal lappet

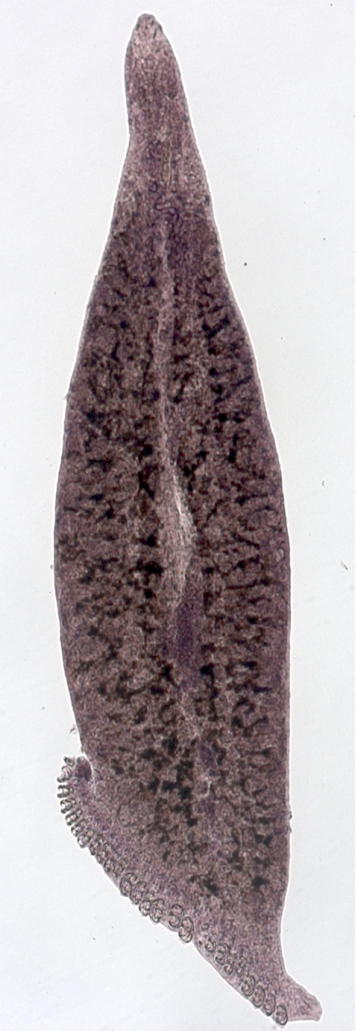
'The pigment in the monogenean's body is haematin derived from ingested fish blood

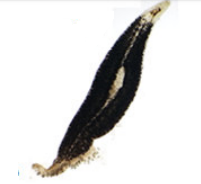
Body with black pigment

== Hosts and localities ==
The type-host of Pseudaxine trachuri is the Atlantic Horse Mackerel Trachurus trachurus (Carangidae), referred to as Caranx trachurus in the original description. The type locality is off Genova, Italy. It was reported on other Carangidae, one Sparidae and one Scombridae.(See table). Pseudaxine trachuri is marked by a rather very diffuse distribution. The marine Trachurus trachurus apparently moved northwards into the Plymouth region in the first half of the last century . However, it is not known whether these fishes brought the monogenean with them, or, the newly arrived fishes were colonised subsequently by local P. trachuri stock.

Host and localities of Pseudaxine trachuri
Family	Host species	Vernacular name of host fish	Locality	Region	Image
Carangidae	Trachurus trachurus	the Atlantic horse mackerel	Northern Mediterranean Sea Southern Mediterranean Sea Northern Atlantic Ocean Southern Atlantic Ocean Northern Pacific Ocean Indian Ocean Southern Pacific Ocean	Italy-France Tunisia-Algeria Plymouth-from Morocco to southwest Norway Morocco Japan Arabian Sea-Red Sea South China Sea	Trachurus trachurus
Carangidae	Trachurus novaezelandiae	The yellowtail horse mackerel	Southern Pacific Ocean	Ozero Tayanovo lake	Trachurus novaezelandiae
Carangidae	Trachurus mediterraneus	the mediterranean horse mackerel	Northern Mediterranean Sea	Turkey-France -Spain-Montenegro	Trachurus mediterraneus
Carangidae	Trachurus capensis	The cape horse mackerel	Indian Ocean Southern Pacific Ocean	Arabian Sea-Red Sea Southern China Sea	Trachurus capensis
Carangidae	Trachurus picturatus	The blue jack mackerel	Northern Atlantic Ocean	Portugal	Trachurus picturatus
Carangidae	Trachurus lathami	The rough scad	Southern Atlantic Ocean	Brazil	Trachurus lathami
Carangidae	Carangoides malabaricus	The Malabar trevally	Indian Ocean Southern Pacific Ocean	Arabian Sea-Red Sea Southern China Sea	Carangoides malabaricus
Carangidae	Carangoides sp. Caranx sp.		Indian Ocean Southern Pacific Ocean	Arabian Sea-Red Sea Southern China Sea	
Scombridae	mackerel		Northern Atlantic Ocean	Plymouth	
Sparidae	Boops boops	The bogue	Northern Mediterranean Sea Southern Mediterranean Sea Northern Atlantic Ocean	Italy-Spain Alboran Sea-Tunisia-Algeria Spain	Boops boops

== Life history ==
=== Populations dynamics ===
Pseudaxine trachuri infect young scads Trachurus trachurus when the 3 or 4 month-old fishes join the sea bottom in October. The monogenean matures in 3–4 months( exceptionally 1 month), and it lives for no longer that one year. Thus, Trachurus specimens pick up new monogeneans at their second year. During the summer months of July, August and September, only adult specimens of Pseudaxine trachuri are found on the gills of their hosts. On the other hand, young fish caught in May are infected by larvae, juveniles and adults. This is due to a temporary reproductive inactivity, leading to a cessation of infection. The reproductive inactivity is probably achieved by eggs entering a state of diapause or suspension of egg assembly itself may be suspended. This cessation of reproductive activity ‘anticipates’ a change in host behaviour, as young scads leave the bottom, where infection occurs, in July and become plankton feeders and thus migrate to look for pelagic-food-organisms. Thus the parasites avoid production of offspring when hosts are absent, and resume reproductive activity in August, ‘anticipating’ the return of potential hosts, young scad, to the sea bottom in October.The behavioural cycle of the host is orchestrated by hormonal changes, and these same changes regulate the parasites’ reproductive cycle.

=== Larval development ===
The oncomiracidium has 4 pairs of lateral hooks. its alimentary canal consists only of a mouth, pharynx, and a simple sacculate intestine. The oncomiracidium develops into a post-oncomiracidial larvae, bilaterally symmetrical, that loses the eyes and 4 pairs of lateral hooks and develops 2 pairs of small hooks. The alimentary canal of these larvae are provided with two buccal suckers, an intestine differentiated into an oesophagus that bifurcates into two branches. The walls of the oesophagus and the intestine are lined by pigment cells, resembling those found in adult Polyopisthocotylea, suggesting that the larvae also feed on blood. During the next phase, the asymmetrical development takes place: clamps are added on one side of the posterior region of the body, with a complete absence of clamp development on the other side of the body. the number of clamps increases as the larva grows bigger, and at the 9-10 clamp stage, the penis sclerites appear. In the 10-12 clamp stage, the vitellaria develop with the intestinal branches, followed by the vitelline reservoir at the 13-16 clamp stage. The body continues to increase in length and in clamp's number until its maximum.
