= Horse mackerel =

Horse mackerel is a vague vernacular term for a range of species of fish throughout the English-speaking world. It is commonly applied to pelagic fishes, especially of the Carangidae (jack mackerels and scads) family, most commonly those of the genera Trachurus or Caranx. Species known as "horse mackerel" in one English dialect or another include:

- Alectis indicus, Indian threadfish (Indo-Pacific)
- Caranx crysos, blue runner (Guadeloupe, Martinique)
- Caranx hippos, Crevalle jack (Guyana, India)
- Megalaspis cordyla, torpedo scad (India)
- Naucrates ductor, pilot fish
- Sarda australis, Australian bonito (Australia)
- various saurel of the Pacific coast of the Americas
- Selar crumenophthalmus, bigeye (India)
- Trachurus capensis, cape horse mackerel (South Africa)
- Trachurus declivis, greenback horse mackerel (Australia)
- Trachurus japonicus, Japanese horse mackerel (Japan)
- Trachurus novaezelandiae, yellowtail horse mackerel (New Zealand)
- Trachurus trachurus, Atlantic horse mackerel (United Kingdom, Ireland)
