= Gastrocotylinae =

Scientific classification
- Kingdom: Animalia
- Phylum: Platyhelminthes
- Class: Monogenea
- Order: Mazocraeidea
- Family: Gastrocotylidae
- Subfamily: Gastrocotylinae; Sproston, 1946

Genera
- See text

Family of worms

Gastrocotylinae is a sub-family of polyopisthocotylean monogeneans. All the species in this family are parasitic on fish.

== Genera ==
According to the Lebedev (1986) the sub-family includes 17 valid genera:

- Allogastrocotyle Nasir & Fuentes Zambrano, 1984
- Amphipolycotyle Hargis, 1957
- Areotestis Yamaguti, 1965
- Churavera Unnithan, 1968
- Cypselurobranchitrema Yamaguti, 1966
- Engraulicola George, 1960
- Engrauliphila Unnithan, 1967
- Engrauliscobina Unnithan, 1967
- Engraulixenus Unnithan, 1967
- Eyelavera Unnithan, 1968
- Gastrocotyle Beneden & Hesse, 1863
- Irinaxine Ghichenok, 1980
- Pellonicola Unnithan, 1967
- Pseudaxine Parona & Perugia, 1890
- Pseudaxinoides Lebedev, 1968
- Quadrivalvula Ghichenok, 1980
- Sibitrema Yamaguti, 1966
