= Gastrocotyle =

Gastrocotyle may refer to:

- Gastrocotyle (flatworm), a genus of flatworms in the family Gastrocotylidae
- Gastrocotyle (plant), a genus of plants in the family Boraginaceae
