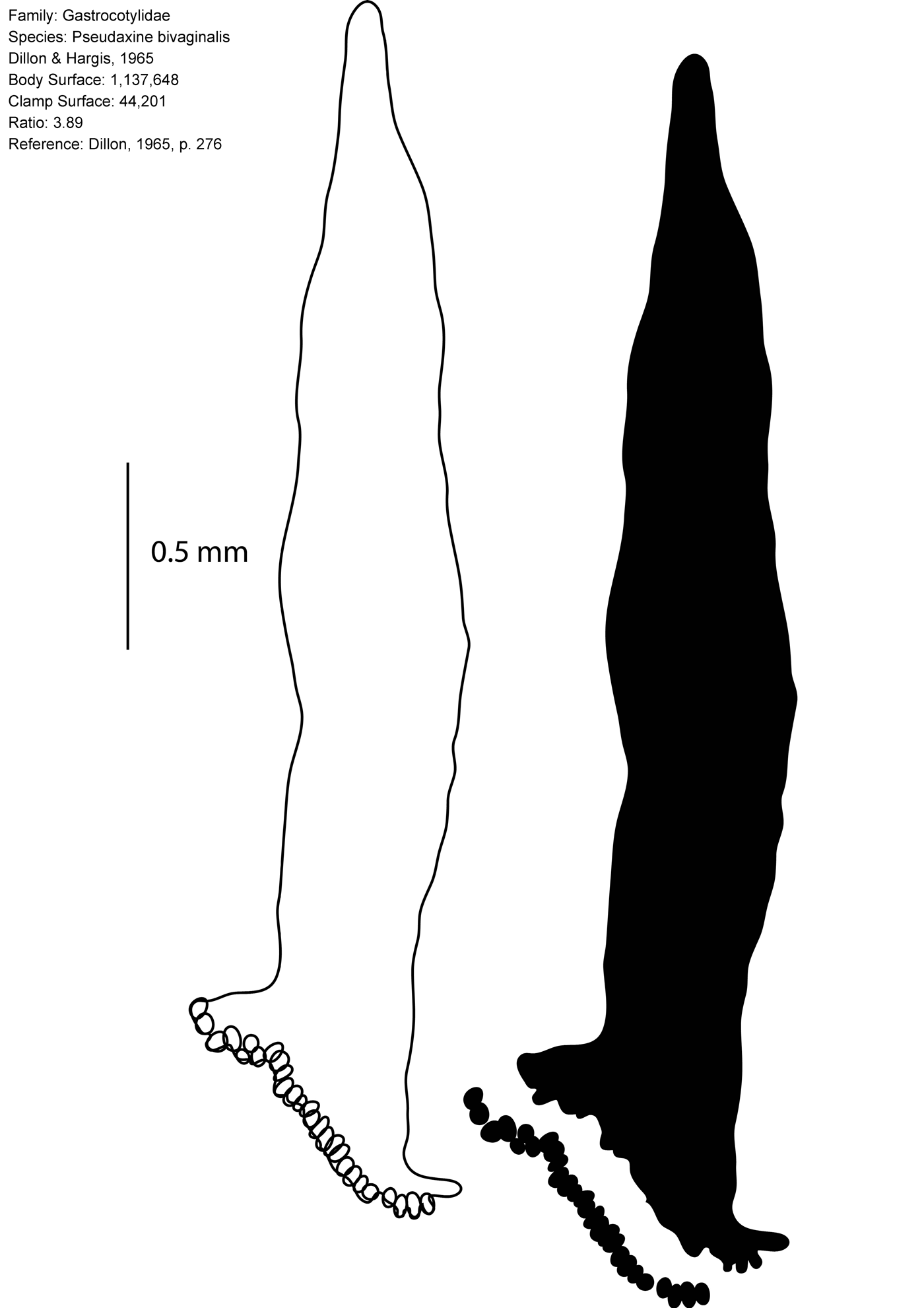

Scientific classification
- Kingdom: Animalia
- Phylum: Platyhelminthes
- Class: Monogenea
- Order: Mazocraeidea
- Family: Gastrocotylidae
- Genus: Pseudaxine
- Species: P. bivaginalis

Binomial name
- Pseudaxine bivaginalis Dillon & Hargis, 1965

= Pseudaxine bivaginalis =

Species of worms

Pseudaxine bivaginalis is a species of monogenean flatworm, which is parasitic on the gills of a marine fish. It belongs to the family Gastrocotylidae.

== Systematics ==
Pseudaxine bivaginalis was described based on 15 specimens, from the gills of the yellowtail horse mackerel Trachurus novaezelandiae (Carangidae), collected off New Zealand. In the same paper, Dillon & Hargis emended the diagnosis of the genus Pseudaxine, to include the presence of (1) a paired vaginae opening near the lateral margins at or near the level of the genital atrium, (2) a genito-intestinal canal short and postovarian or relatively long and paraovarian.

== Description ==
Pseudaxine bivaginalis has the general morphology of all species of Pseudaxine, with an elongate body and an anterior extremity constricted at the level of buccal suckers in most specimens, comprising an anterior part which contains most organs and a posterior part called the haptor. The haptor is asymmetrical, with a laterally directed end (the direction in which the end points, right or left, varies individually, but the internal organs appear to maintain a constant orientation regardless of this variation), and bears 23–34 clamps similar in shape but slightly dissimilar in size, arranged in a single row. The clamps of the haptor attach the animal to the gill of the fish. The extreme of the haptor carries an elongated proboscis-like process called "the terminal lappet", bearing 2 pairs of gastrocotyloid anchors. There are also two buccal suckers at the anterior extremity. The digestive organs include an anterior subterminal mouth, a pharynx, an oesophagus and a posterior intestine that bifurcates near the level of the genital atrium in two lateral branches. The intestinal branches are ramified medially and laterally and are not confluent posteriorly. Each adult contains male and female reproductive organs. The reproductive organs include an anterior genital atrium, armed with 12–14 hooks, a paired vaginae ventrolateral, near the genital atrium, a foldedovary and 12–18 testespost-ovarian, located between the intestinal branches and extend posteriorly to the anterior part of the haptor. Eggs are fusiform, with filaments at both ends.

== Etymology ==
The species name refers to New Zealand, the type-locality of the species.

== Hosts and localities ==
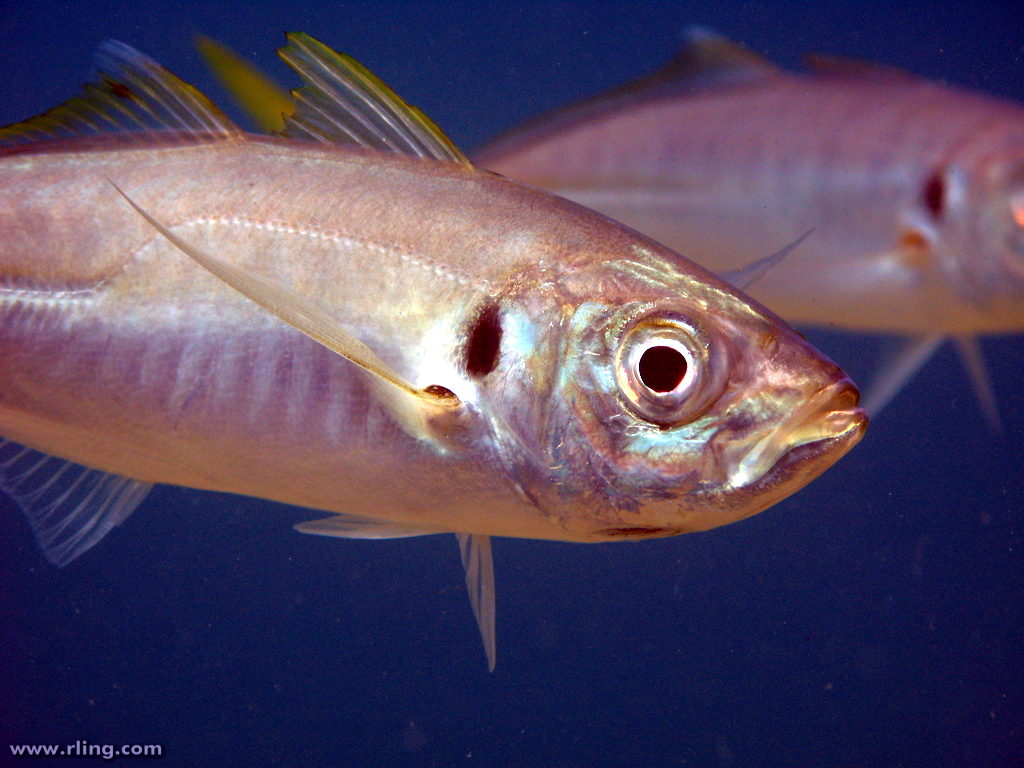
the yellowtail horse mackerel Trachurus novaezelandiae is the type host of Pseudaxine bivaginalis

The type-host and only recorded host is the yellowtail horse mackerel Trachurus novaezelandiae (Carangidae). Pseudaxine bivaginalis was first described of fishes caught off New Zealand. It was also recorded off type locality, Australia, south China sea.
