= Pseudaxine kurra =

Scientific classification
- Kingdom: Animalia
- Phylum: Platyhelminthes
- Class: Monogenea
- Order: Mazocraeidea
- Family: Gastrocotylidae
- Genus: Pseudaxine
- Species: P. kurra

Binomial name
- Pseudaxine kurra Unnithan, 1968

Species of worms

Pseudaxine kurra is a species of monogenean, parasitic on the gills of a marine fish. It belongs to the family Gastrocotylidae.

== Systematics ==
Pseudaxine kurra was described based on several specimens from the gills of the yellowtail scad Caranx kurra ( currently named Atule mate) (Carangidae), collected off India.

== Description ==
Pseudaxine kurra has the general morphology of all species of Pseudaxine, with an elongate body tapering towards both ends, comprising an anterior part which contains most organs and a posterior part called the haptor. The haptor triangular, asymmetrical, without extensions from body organs, disposed slightly oblique to the long axis of the body and bears 15-28 clamps, arranged in a single row. The clamps of the haptor attach the animal to the gill of the fish. The extreme of the haptor carries an elongated proboscis-like process called "the terminal lapet", bearing two pair of symmetrical hooks. There are also two spherical or oval buccal suckers at the anterior extremity. The digestive organs include an anterior, terminal funnel shaped and muscular mouth, a large and oval pharynx, a broad oesophagus and a posterior intestine that bifurcates in two lateral branches with numerous short outer and few short intercrural branches, posteriorly terminating independently behind the last testis, the right branche slightly over-reach the left. Each adult contains male and female reproductive organs. The reproductive organs include an anterior genital atrium, a muscular and conical penis, with a basal bulb and a distal corona of 10-12 recurved hooks, a single unarmed dorsal vagina, an inverted U-shaped ovary, and 9-14 irregularly oval or somewhat rectangular testes post-ovarian, and extend to the base of the haptor in the intercrural space. Eggs spindle shaped, with filaments at both ends.

== Etymology ==
The specific epithet kurra is derived from the generic name of the type-host Caranx kurra.

== Hosts and localities ==
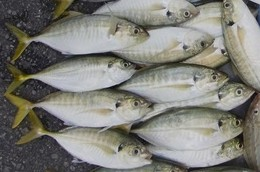
The yellowtail scad Atule mate is the type host of Pseudaxine kurra

The type-host is the yellowtail scad Atule mate (Carangidae). The type-locality is off India. Several specimens of Gastrocotyle kurra were observed on the gill filaments of the host along with Pseudaxine kurra. It was also recorded on the type-host off China.
