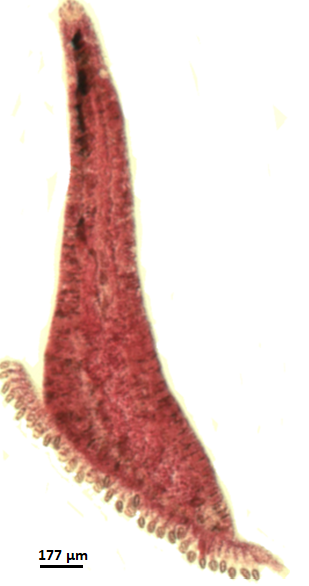
- Allogastrocotyle bivaginalis

Scientific classification
- Domain: Eukaryota
- Kingdom: Animalia
- Phylum: Platyhelminthes
- Class: Monogenea
- Order: Mazocraeidea
- Family: Gastrocotylidae
- Genus: Allogastrocotyle; Nasir & Fuentes Zambrano, 1984

= Allogastrocotyle =

Genus of flatworms

Allogastrocotyle is a genus within the phylum Platyhelminthes and class Monogenea. The only species in this genus (Allogastrocotyle bivaginalis) is parasitic upon fish.

== Systematics ==
Allogastrocotyle was established to accommodate Allogastrocotyle bivaginalis from the gills of the rough scad Trachurus lathami, and designated as the type species of the genus. This genus resembles Gastrocotyle and Pseudaxine especially in having a haptor developed on one side of the body. However, it differs by the following features:

- Two ventro-lateral vaginal pores, one on each side of the body.
- Clamps supported by short peduncles.
- Haptor occupying two longitudinal thirds of the body.

== Species ==
Allogastrocotyle includes one species:

- Allogastrocotyle bivaginalis Nasir & Fuentes Zambrano, 1984
