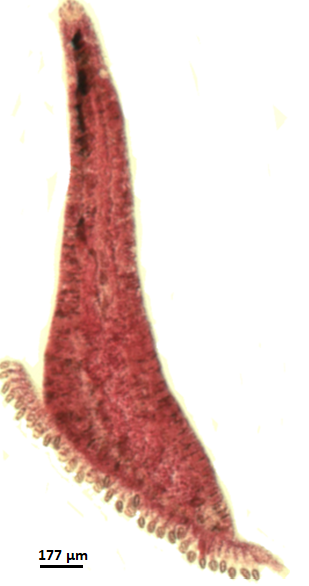
- Allogastrocotyle bivaginalis

Scientific classification
- Domain: Eukaryota
- Kingdom: Animalia
- Phylum: Platyhelminthes
- Class: Monogenea
- Order: Mazocraeidea
- Family: Gastrocotylidae
- Genus: Allogastrocotyle
- Species: A. bivaginalis

Binomial name
- Allogastrocotyle bivaginalis Nasir & Fuentes Zambrano, 1984

= Allogastrocotyle bivaginalis =

Species of worms

Allogastrocotyle bivaginalis is a species of monogenean flatworm, which is parasitic on the gills of a marine fish. It belongs to the family Gastrocotylidae.

The species was described and illustrated from two specimens from the gills the rough scad Trachurus lathami (Carangidae) off Venezuela, and designated as the type species of the genus.

In 2019, Bouguerche et al. examined specimens of monogeneans similar to Allogastrocotyle bivaginalis, collected from the gills of the Blue jack mackerel Trachurus picturatus (Carangidae) from off the Algerian coast, Mediterranean Sea. They claimed that they could not distinguish the Mediterranean specimens from A. bivaginalis, neither on the base of morphology nor on molecules (because molecular information was lacking on A. bivaginalis from Venezuela).

== Gallery ==
Allogastrocotyle bivaginalis (specimens from off Algeria): Various parts.

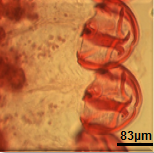
Clamps

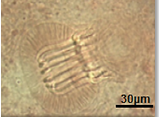
Genital atrium

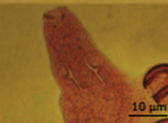
Terminal lappet

== Etymology ==
The species' name refers to the presence of two vaginal openings.

== Hosts and localities ==
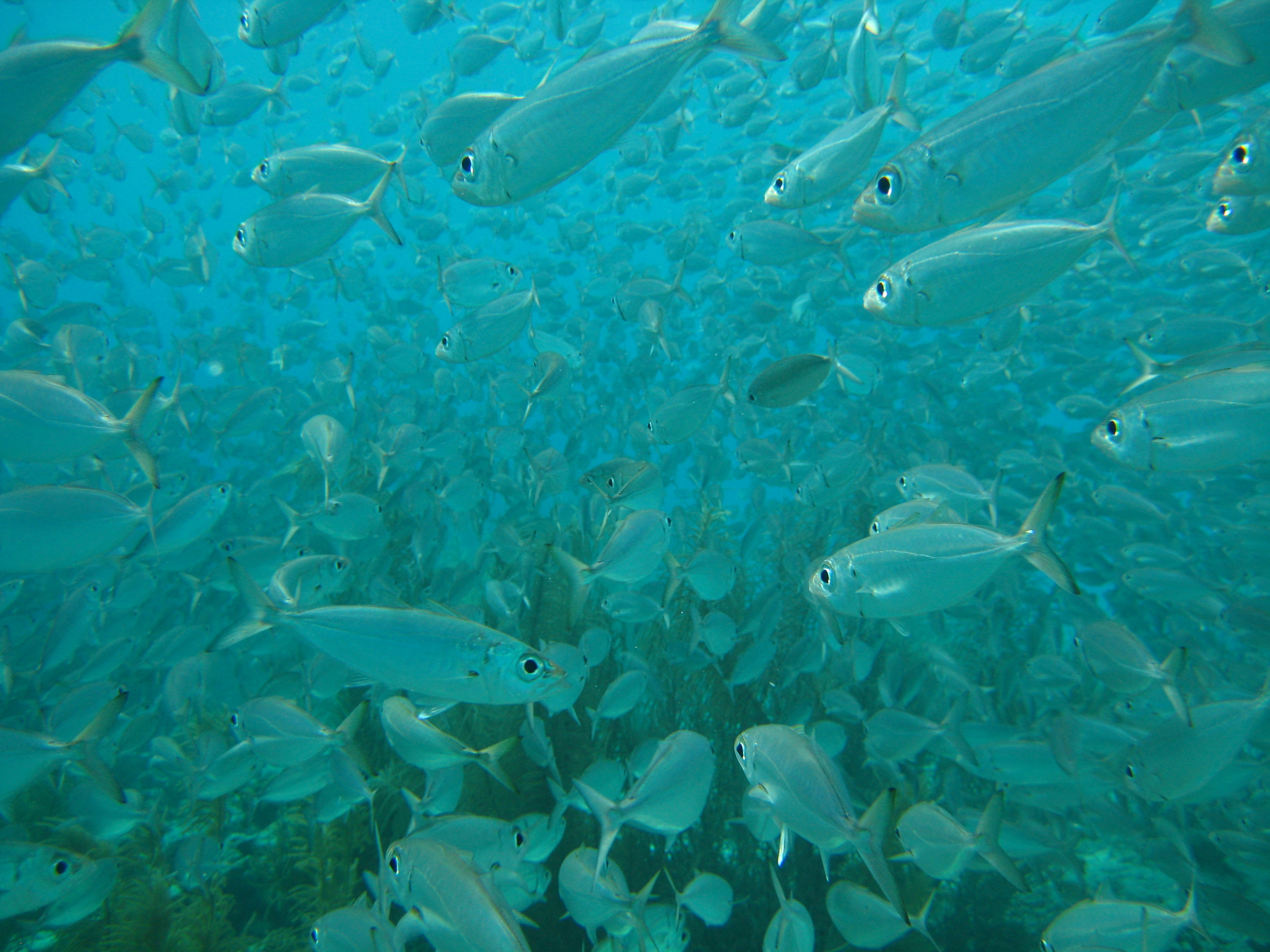
The rough scad Trachurus lathami is the type host of Allogastrocotyle bivaginalis

The type-host is the rough scad Trachurus lathami (Carangidae). The type-locality is off Venezuela. The species is also present in the Mediterranean Sea, on another host, the Blue jack mackerel Trachurus picturatus.
