= Pseudaxine indicana =

Scientific classification
- Domain: Eukaryota
- Kingdom: Animalia
- Phylum: Platyhelminthes
- Class: Monogenea
- Order: Mazocraeidea
- Family: Gastrocotylidae
- Genus: Pseudaxine
- Species: P. indicana

Binomial name
- Pseudaxine indicana Chauhan, 1945

Species of worms

Pseudaxine indicana is a species of monogenean flatworm, which is parasitic on the gills of a marine fish. It belongs to the family Gastrocotylidae.

== Systematics ==
Pseudaxine indicana was described based on single contracted specimen, from the gills of the black sea-bream Chrysophrys berda (currently named Acanthopagrus berda) (Sparidae), collected off India. It is a species dubia due to the incomplete description, the lack of material, and the unusual host.

== Description ==
Pseudaxine indicana has the general morphology of all species of Pseudaxine, with an elongate body tapering anteriorly and broad posteriorly, comprising an anterior part which contains most organs and a posterior part called the haptor. The haptor is fan-shaped and asymmetrical, inclined to the body but separated from it by a notch, and bears 19 clamps, arranged in a single row. The clamps of the haptor attach the animal to the gill of the fish. The extreme of the haptor carries an elongated proboscis-like process called "the terminal lapet", bearing in the middle of its length a pair of hooks. There are also two oval buccal suckers at the anterior extremity. The digestive organs include an anterior, terminal mouth, an oval pharynx, an oesophagus and a posterior intestine that bifurcates in two lateral branches provided with many lateral branches ramifying especially on the outer side, the branches are not contiguous posteriorly and extend to near the posterior end of the haptor. Each adult contains male and female reproductive organs. The reproductive organs include an anterior genital atrium, armed with 24 hooks, a single vagina, an elongate cylindrical ovary and 40 small follicular testespost-ovarian, lying irregularly in the inter-crural field anteriorly in two rows and posteriorly in three rows in posterior half of body proper. Few testes extend into the haptor. Eggs with long filaments at both ends.

== Etymology ==
The species name refers to India, the type-locality of the species.

== Hosts and localities ==
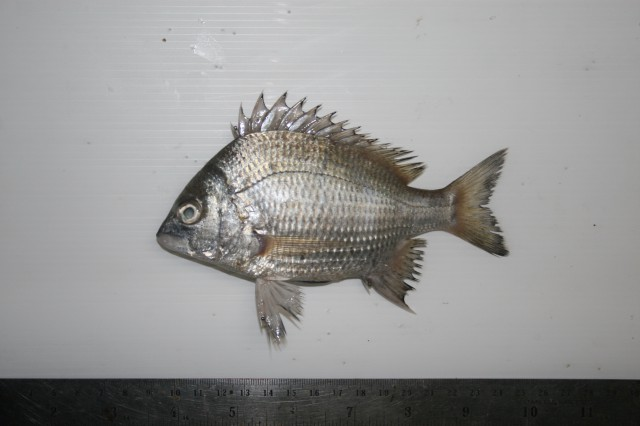
Acanthopagrus berda is the type host of Pseudaxine indicana

The type-host is the black sea-bream Acanthopagrus berda) (Sparidae). The type-locality is off India. It was also recorded on an undefined mackerel “Salala” off Fiji island.
