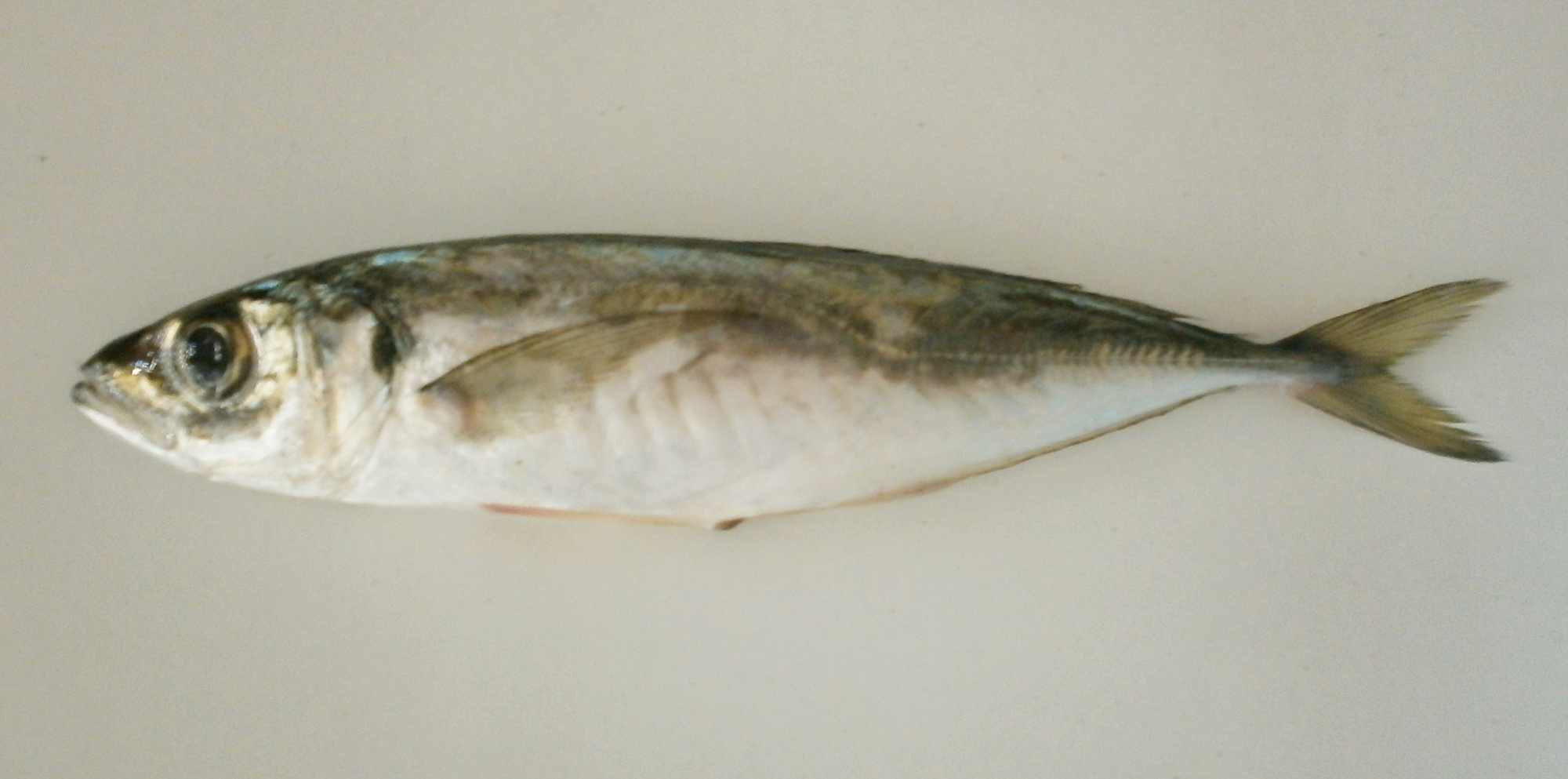

Conservation status
- Least Concern (IUCN 3.1)

Scientific classification
- Kingdom: Animalia
- Phylum: Chordata
- Class: Actinopterygii
- Division: Teleostei
- Order: Carangiformes
- Suborder: Carangoidei
- Family: Carangidae
- Genus: Trachurus
- Species: T. mediterraneus

Binomial name
- Trachurus mediterraneus (Steindachner, 1868)

Subspecies
- T. m. mediterraneus (Steindachner, 1868); T. m. ponticus Aleev, 1956

Synonyms
- Caranx trachurus mediterraneus Steindachner, 1868; Suareus furnestini Dardignac & Vincent, 1958

= Mediterranean horse mackerel =

Species of fish

The Mediterranean horse mackerel (Trachurus mediterraneus), also known as the Black Sea horse mackerel, horse mackerel, Mediterranean scad, common scad, or simply scad, is a species of mackerel in the family Carangidae found in the eastern Atlantic from Bay of Biscay to Mauritania, including the Mediterranean Sea. It is a benthopelagic, subtropical, marine fish that can reach up to 60 cm (24 in) in length. In the countries near the Mediterranean and Black Seas, it makes up a significant portion of fish catch, 54% of fish caught in the latter. Despite overfishing in the 1980s, catch numbers have leveled out and it is listed as least concern by the International Union for Conservation of Nature.

== Taxonomy and phylogeny ==
The Mediterranean horse mackerel was first described in 1868 by Austrian ichthyologist, zoologist, and herpetologist Franz Steindachner, who gave it the name Caranx trachurus mediterraneus. It was also described two other times, by Y. G. Aleev in 1956 and J. Dardignac and A. Vincent. Its generic name comes from the Greek roots trachys meaning "rough" and oura meaning "tail".

== Description ==
The Mediterranean horse mackerel has an elongated, compressed body (up to 60 cm (24 in) in length, common length 30 cm (12 in)) with a large head and projected lower jaw. The nostrils are small and close-set and the eyes are protected by a well-developed adipose eyelid. Its upper jaw, or maxilla, is also large and wide. Its body is a dusky color, blue to grey to black in color dorsally and on top of the head, while the lower two-thirds of the body is white to silver in color. Its caudal fin is yellow and it has a distinct black mark just posterior to the operculum. It has 36–41 gillrakers and the anal fin is preceded by two separate spines.

== Distribution and habitat ==
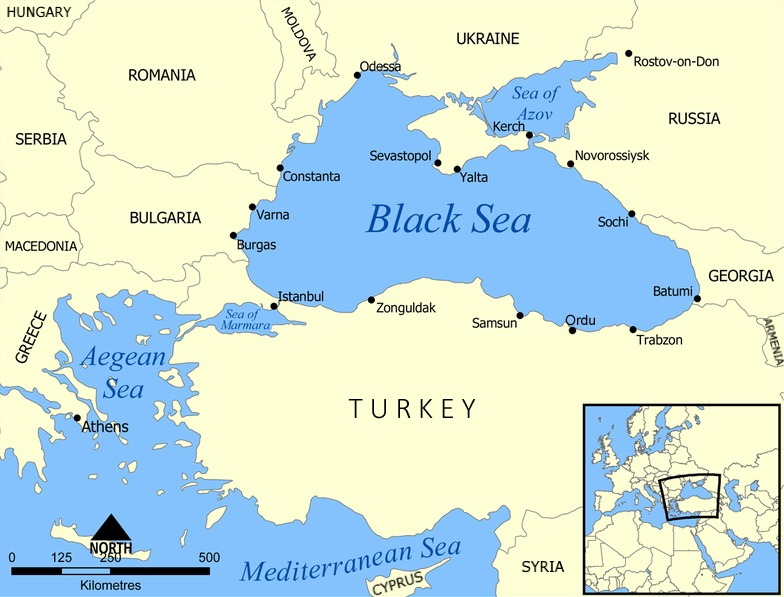
Map of the Black Sea region

The Mediterranean horse mackerel is found in subtropical waters throughout the eastern Atlantic Ocean from the Bay of Biscay to Mauritania, as well as the Mediterranean Sea, the Aegean archipelago, the Black Sea, the Propontis or Sea of Marmara, and the southwestern Sea of Azov. Its latitudinal range extends from 49°N to 28°N and its longitudinal range extends from 13°W to 43°E. The subspecies T. m. mediterraneus is found in the Mediterranean Sea, while the T. m. ponticus subspecies, also called the Black Sea scad, is native to the Black Sea, the Sea of Marmara, and the Sea of Azov. T. m. ponticus is found in the territorial waters of every country bordering the Black Sea: Bulgaria, Georgia, Romania, Russia, Turkey, and Ukraine. Subspecies populations are not isolated and some limited migration between seas occurs. Hybrid offspring have been found in the wild. Its typical depth range is 5–250 m (16–820 ft), though it can be found as deep as 500 m (1,600 ft). It lives near the ocean floor, though it sometimes schools near the surface.

== Biology and ecology ==
A marine species that prefers brackish water and subtropical temperatures, the Mediterranean horse mackerel is oceandromous, that is it migrates within its native bodies of water. It feeds primarily on sardines, anchovies, and small crustaceans. It shoals with other members of its genus, such as T. trachurus and T. picturatus.

Like other mackerels, the Mediterranean horse mackerel's reproduction is oviparous. Its reproductive cycle is divided into three distinct stages, the prereproductive, reproductive, and postreproductive. The prereproductive stages occurs from January to April and the postreproductive stage occurs from September to December. During these periods, the gonads are much smaller than the reproductive stage. Mating occurs in the summer from May to August, during which testes and ovaries grow significantly in size. The ovaries become a dark orange color and eggs are visible on the surface. Embryonic development occurs in 24–26 hours. Eggs are pelagic and 0.71–0.92 mm (0.028–0.036 in) in length. Sexual maturity is reached at 2 years of age and around 16 cm (6.3 in) in length for both males and females.

It is parasitized by the monogeneans Gastrocotyle trachuri, Pseudaxine trachuri, and Cemocotyle trachuri.

== Human interaction ==
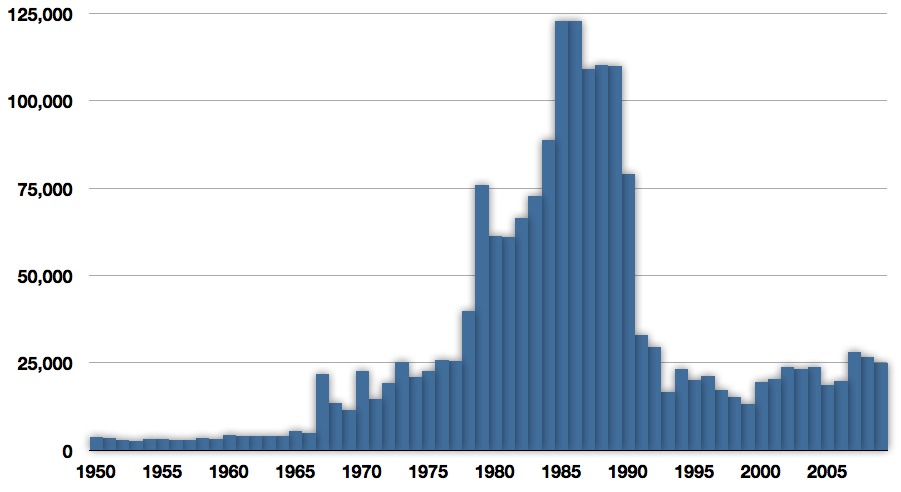
Commercial capture of Mediterranean horse mackerel in tonnes from 1950 to 2009

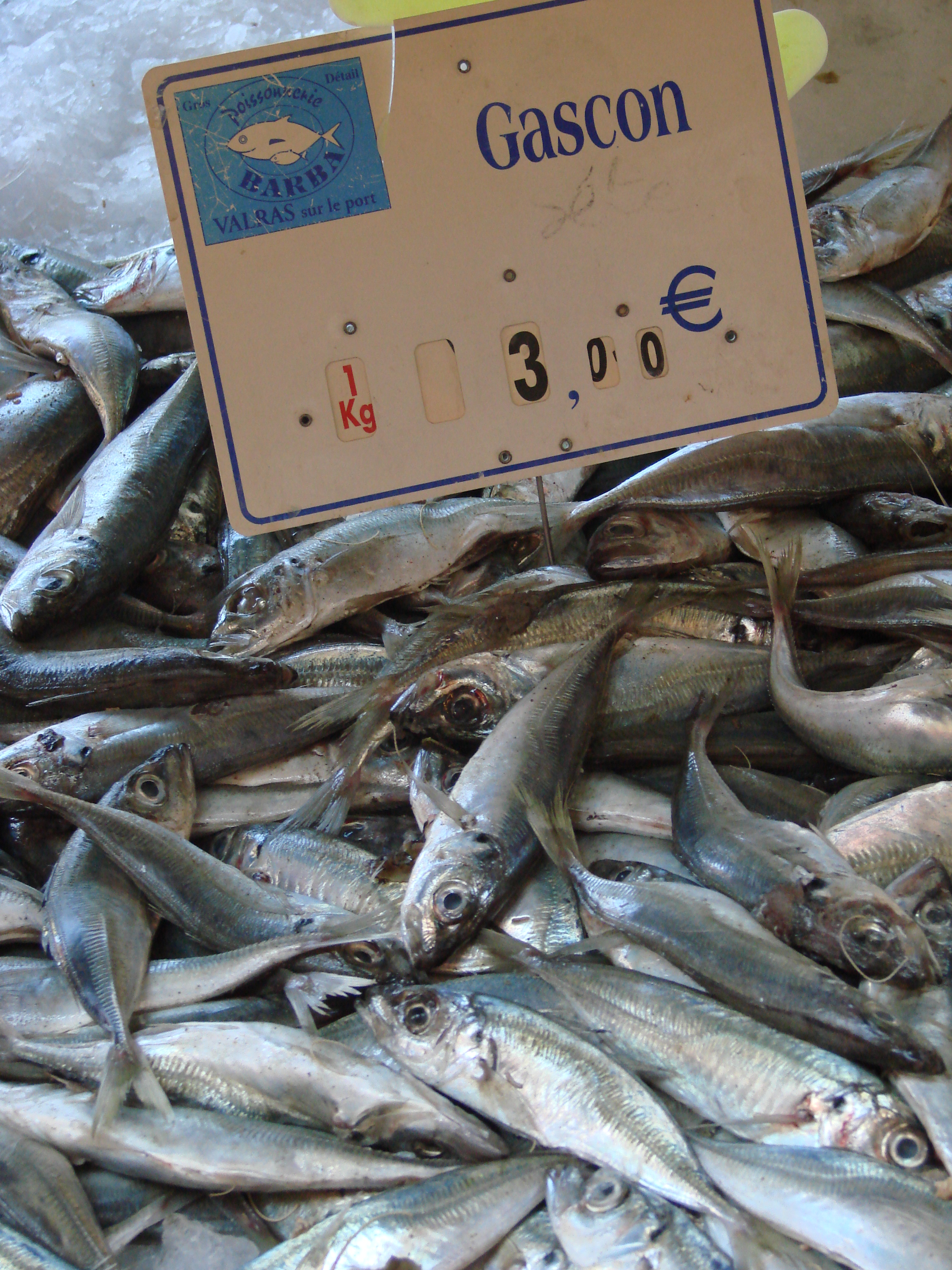
Mediterranean horse mackerel are an important economic resource in the Mediterranean Sea.

The Mediterranean horse mackerel is an important resource in the Mediterranean Sea and the Black Sea region. It makes up 54% of catches in the Black Sea and 39% in the Sea of Marmara. In the Aegean and Mediterranean Seas, it only totals 3–4% of annual catches. Fixed nets and seines are common methods used to catch Mediterranean horse mackerel. Along with T. trachurus, it is one of two Trachurus species in the Mediterranean. Because it forms dense schools and lives in shallower waters, the Mediterranean horse mackerel is the more commonly caught species. Along with Engraulis encrasicolus, it makes up 59% of seafood production in Turkey.

Despite being regularly caught in mixed-species fisheries, the Mediterranean horse mackerel is listed as least concern by the IUCN. Its wide range buffers it from steep population declines, and none has been observed in recent years, with catches leveling out in the past decade. Overfishing in the 1980s led to a steep decline in catches in the Black and Marmara Seas, but has since become stable. Some conservation measures are in place in certain European countries. Minimum catch lengths are 15 cm (5.9 in) in the EU, 10 cm (3.9 in) in Ukraine, 12 cm (4.7 in) in Romania and Bulgaria, and 13 cm (5.1 in) in Turkey.
