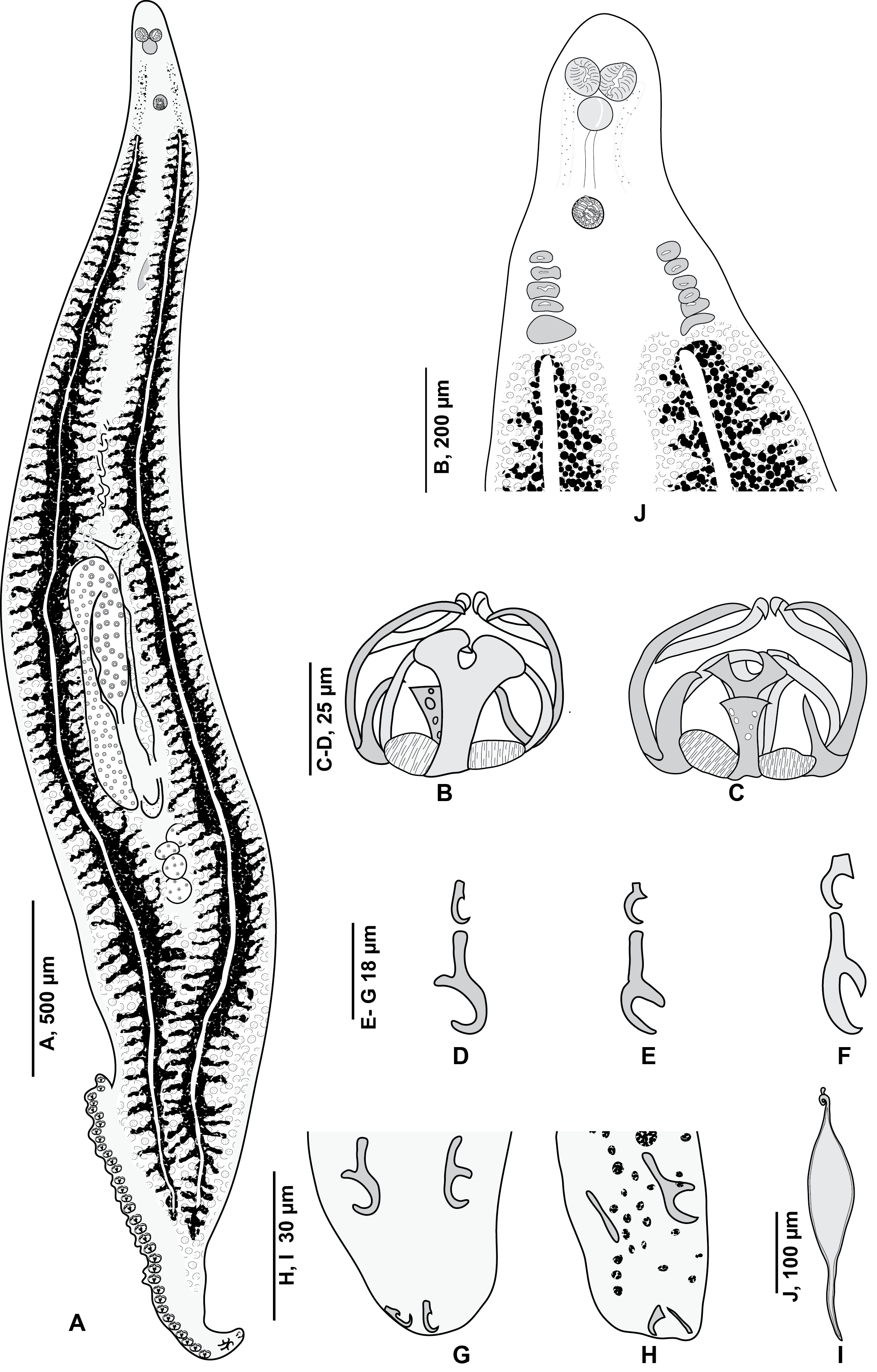
- Pseudaxine trachuri (Type-species of Pseudaxine)

Scientific classification
- Domain: Eukaryota
- Kingdom: Animalia
- Phylum: Platyhelminthes
- Class: Monogenea
- Order: Mazocraeidea
- Family: Gastrocotylidae
- Genus: Pseudaxine; Parona & Perugia, 1890

= Pseudaxine =

Genus of flatworms

Pseudaxine is a genus which belongs to the phylum Platyhelminthes and class Monogenea; all its species are parasites of fish.

== Morphology ==
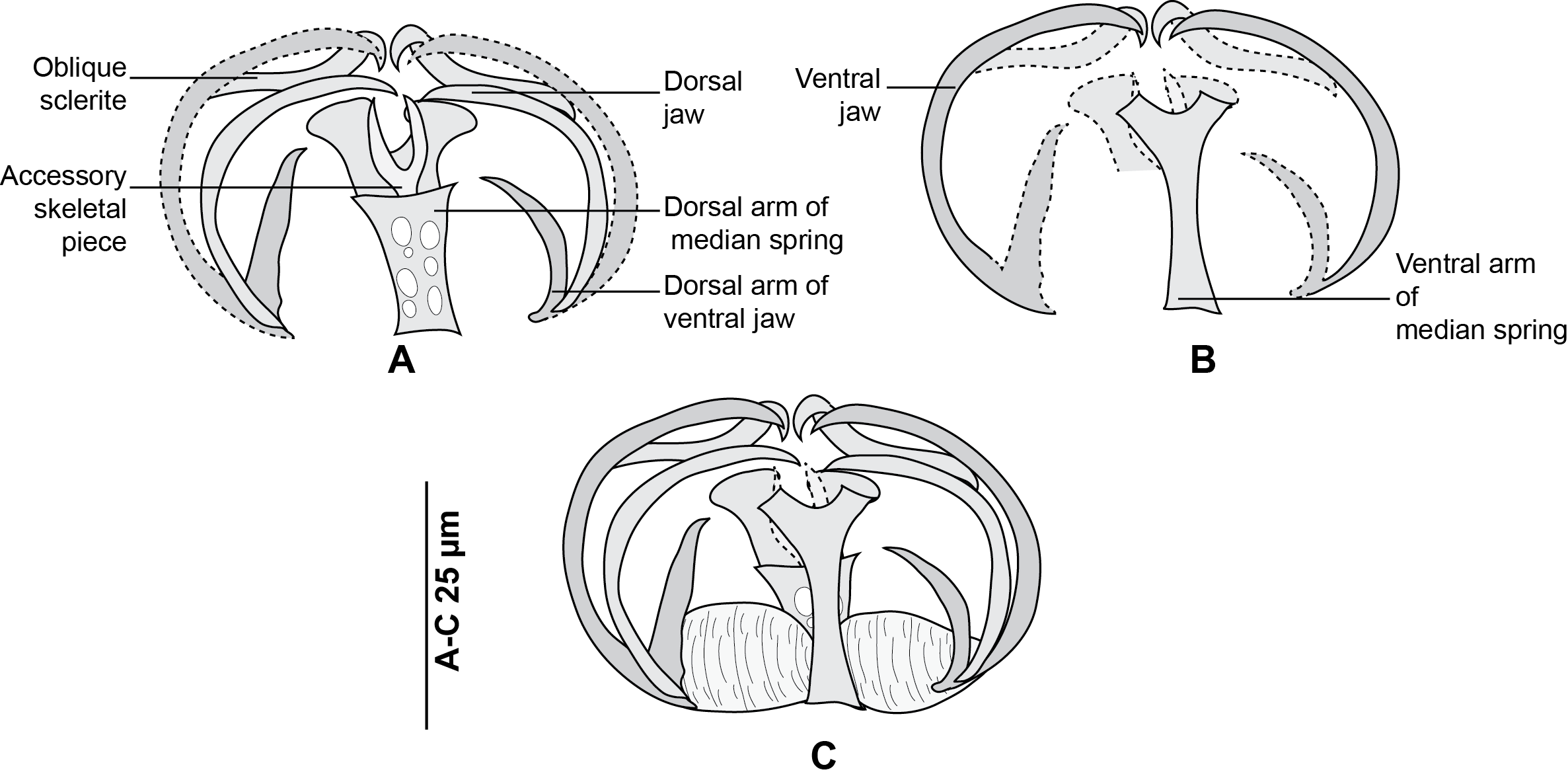
The clamps of Pseudaxine trachuri

Species of Pseudaxine are ectoparasites that affect their host by attaching themselves as larvae on the gills of the fish and grow into adult stage. This larval stage is called oncomiracidium, and is characterized as free swimming and ciliated. The clamps are distributed along one margin of the haptor. Pseudaxine resemble Axine in having a single row of 20 – 30 clamps on one side of the body. However, it differs from Axine in having their hooks situated at the posterior end of the clamp row. Pseudaxine also resembles Gastrocotyle in having a single row of clamps on one side, however, in Pseudaxine the haptor is oblique, while in Gastrocotyle the haptor is parallel to the body-axis, and extends to the ovarian zone.

== Systematics ==
Pseudaxine was established to accommodate Pseudaxine trachuri from the gills of the Atlantic horse mackerel Trachurus trachurus (referred to as Caranx trachurus in the original description), designated as the type species of the genus. It was placed in the Microcotylinae, in Gastrocotylinae then in Arreptocotylidae. Currently, it is included in the Gastrocotylidae.

== Species ==
Nine species have been described in Pseudaxine:

- Pseudaxine trachuri Parona & Perugia, 1890
- Pseudaxine vagans Ishii, 1936 currently included in Allopseudaxine Yamaguti, 1943
- Pseudaxine katsuwonis Ishii, 1936 currently included in Allopseudaxinoides Yamaguti, 1965
- Pseudaxine mexicana Meserve, 1938 currently included in Mexicotyle Lebedev, 1984
- Pseudaxine indicana Chauhan, 1945
- Pseudaxine texana Koratha, 1955 currently considered a junior synonyme of Pseudaxine mexicana
- Pseudaxine bivaginalis Dillon & Hargis, 1965
- Pseudaxine triangula Mamaev, 1967 currently included in Churavera Unnithan, 1968
- Pseudaxine decapteri Yamaguti, 1968 currently included in Pseudaxinoides Lebedev, 1968
- Pseudaxine kurra Unnithan, 1968
