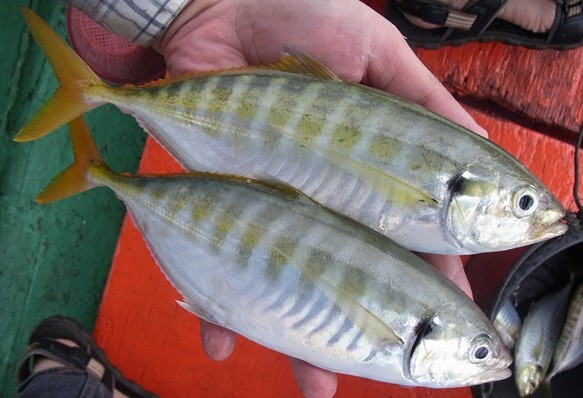

Conservation status
- Least Concern (IUCN 3.1)

Scientific classification
- Kingdom: Animalia
- Phylum: Chordata
- Class: Actinopterygii
- Division: Teleostei
- Order: Carangiformes
- Suborder: Carangoidei
- Family: Carangidae
- Subfamily: Caranginae
- Genus: Atule; D. S. Jordan & E. K. Jordan, 1922
- Species: A. mate

Binomial name
- Atule mate (G. Cuvier, 1833)
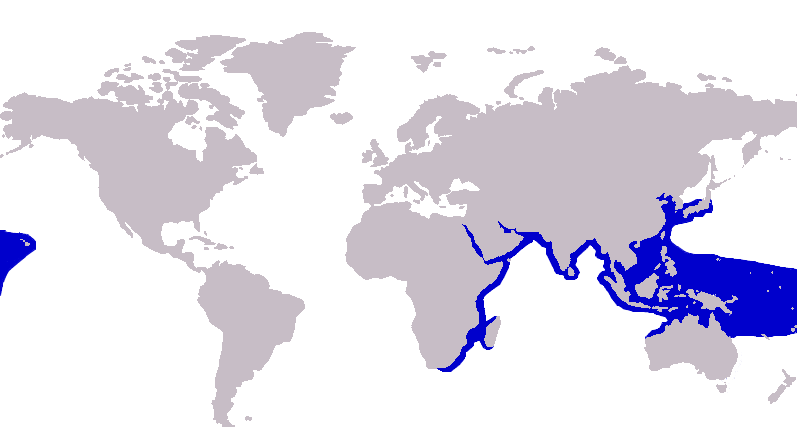
- Approximate range of the yellowtail scad

Synonyms
- Caranx mate, Cuvier, 1833; Alepes mate, (Cuvier, 1833); Caranx xanthurus, Cuvier, 1833; Caranx affinis, Rüppell, 1836; Selar affinis, (Rüppell, 1836); Selar hasseltii, Bleeker, 1851; Caranx hasseltii, (Bleeker, 1851); Carangus politus, Jenkins, 1903; Decapterus politus, (Jenkins, 1903); Decapterus lundini, Jordan & Seale, 1906; Decapterus normani, Bertin & Dollfus, 1948

= Yellowtail scad =

Species of fish

The yellowtail scad (Atule mate) (also known as the northern yellowtail scad, one-finlet scad, yakka, deep trevally and omaka), is an abundant species of small inshore marine fish of the jack family, Carangidae. The species is widespread in the Indo-Pacific region from east Africa in the west to Hawaii in the east, extending north to Japan and south to Australia. The yellowtail scad is the only member of the monotypic genus Atule and is distinguished from similar species by a well-developed adipose eyelid and finlet-like extensions of the last rays of the dorsal and anal fins. It inhabits coastal areas such as bays and coral reefs, preying on small fishes and crustaceans. Spawning has been well studied in Hawaii, where fish enter bays to spawn, releasing up to 161,000 eggs each between March and October. The yellowtail scad is an important component of fisheries throughout its range, taken by a number of netting and hook-and-line methods. It is a prized food fish in some regions and is cooked or preserved by a variety of methods.

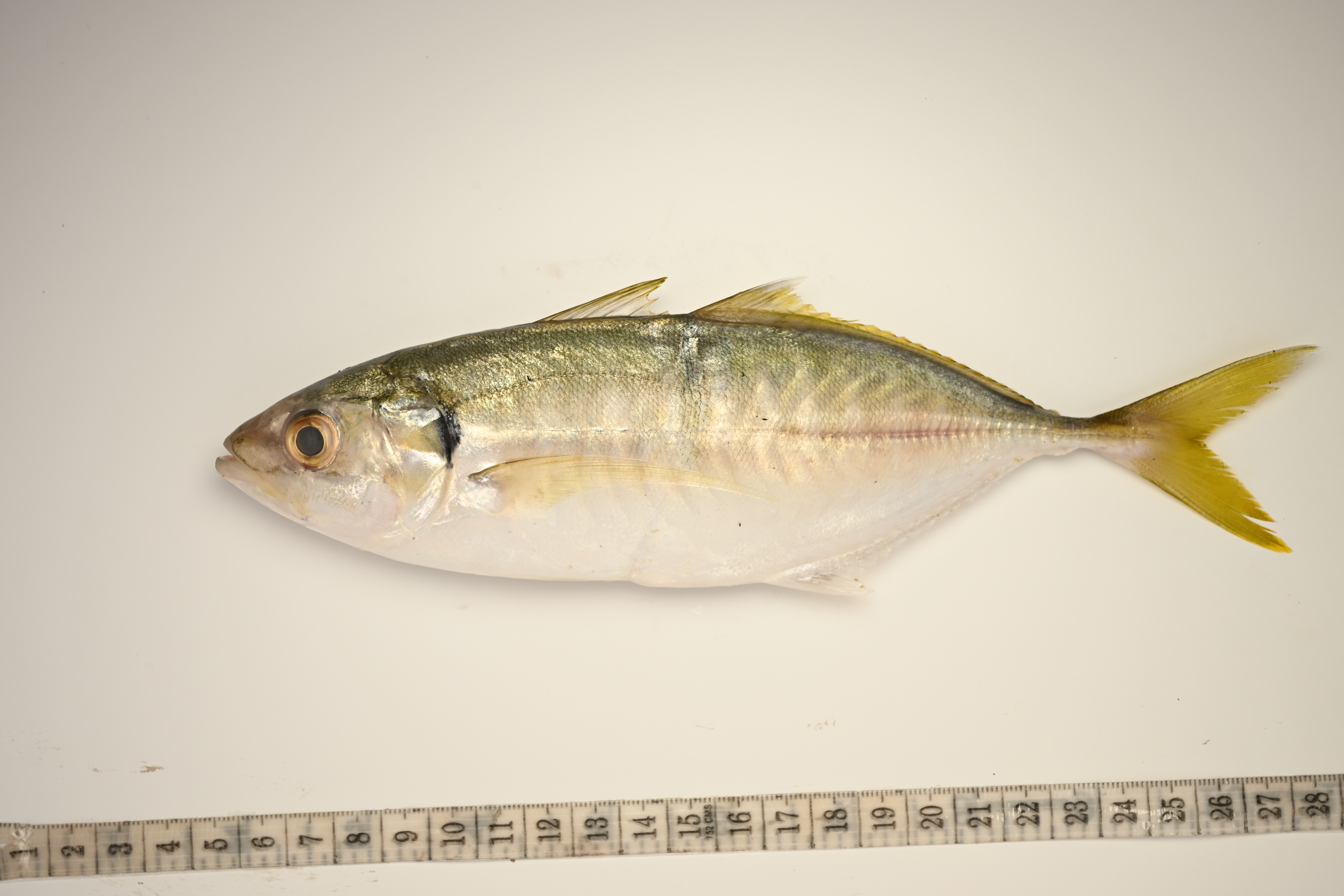
Atule mate

== Taxonomy and naming ==
The yellowtail scad is the only member of the monotypic genus Atule, one of 30 genera in the jack and horse mackerel family Carangidae. The Carangidae are part of the order Carangiformes.

The yellowtail scad was first scientifically described by the French naturalist Georges Cuvier in 1833 based on a specimen taken from the Seychelles, which was designated to be the holotype. He named the species Caranx mate, thereby placing the species in a genus with a number of larger, deeper-bodied jacks. The species was subsequently redescribed and named many times, with most authors placing these "species" in other jack genera including Caranx, Decapterus and Selar. In 1906, Jordan and Seale produced one such name in the form of Decapterus lundini. Jordan later re-examined this taxon and decided it warranted its own, separate genus and thus created Atule, making Decapterus lundini the type species of the genus. With the taxonomic history of the species confused with numerous synonyms, it was not until 1953 that Herre concluded that D. lundini was a junior synonym of Cuvier's C. mate, thus giving the latter priority and creating the currently accepted name of Atule mate.

The wide distribution of the species has led to many common names being applied to the species. In English, the most common name is yellowtail scad or some variation of this. Occasionally this combination will be proceeded by a variety of words including "barred" and "northern". Other names applied include one-finlet scad, deep trevally, the broad name of horse mackerel, as well as the Hawaiian ʻomaka or āmaka and Malay or Indonesian ikan selar.

The generic name Atule is derived from its Hawaiian name, also spelled akule, while mate is Hawaiian for "dead."

== Description ==
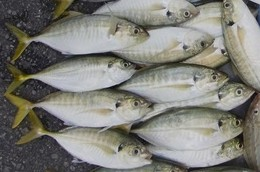
Yellowtail scad from Palau

The yellowtail scad has a body profile quite similar to that of the other fish often called 'scad' from the genera Decapterus and Trachurus, having a moderately compressed, oval-shaped body. The dorsal and ventral profiles of the fish are nearly evenly convex, with the two lines intersecting at the pointed snout. There are two separate dorsal fins; the first consisting of eight moderately high spines and the second of a single spine followed by 22 to 25 soft rays. The anal fin consists of two anteriorly detached spines followed by a single spine attached to 18 to 21 soft rays. The terminal soft rays of both the anal and dorsal fins are nearly twice as long as the penultimate rays, forming distinctive finlet-like structures, although are still attached to the main fin structure by interradial membranes. The lateral line is slightly arched anteriorally, with the intersection of the curved and straight section occurring below the sixth to eighth dorsal soft ray. The curved section contains between 39 and 57 scales, while the straight section has no to 10 scales and 36 to 49 scutes. Another of the major distinguishing features of the species is an adipose eyelid which fully encloses the eye except for a small vertical slit over the pupil. This feature is only observable in individuals greater than 10 cm, as juveniles below this length are still developing the eyelid. Both jaws have a single row of small teeth, although two or three rows of small canine teeth are present in older individuals. There are 37 to 44 gill rakers in total and 24 vertebrae. The yellowtail scad is a small species in comparison with many of the other fishes within the Carangidae, reaching a recorded maximum length of only 30 cm, although is more often encountered around 20 cm.

The yellowtail scad is a bright olive green above, transitioning to a more golden green ventrally, before becoming silvery white on the underside of the fish. Nine to 16 faint grey bars run vertically on the sides of the fish, as well as a black spot slightly smaller than the eye on the upper margin of operculum and adjacent shoulder region. The caudal and dorsal fins are a characteristic greenish yellow colour, the pelvic fins are white, while the rest of the fins are hyaline.

== Distribution and habitat ==
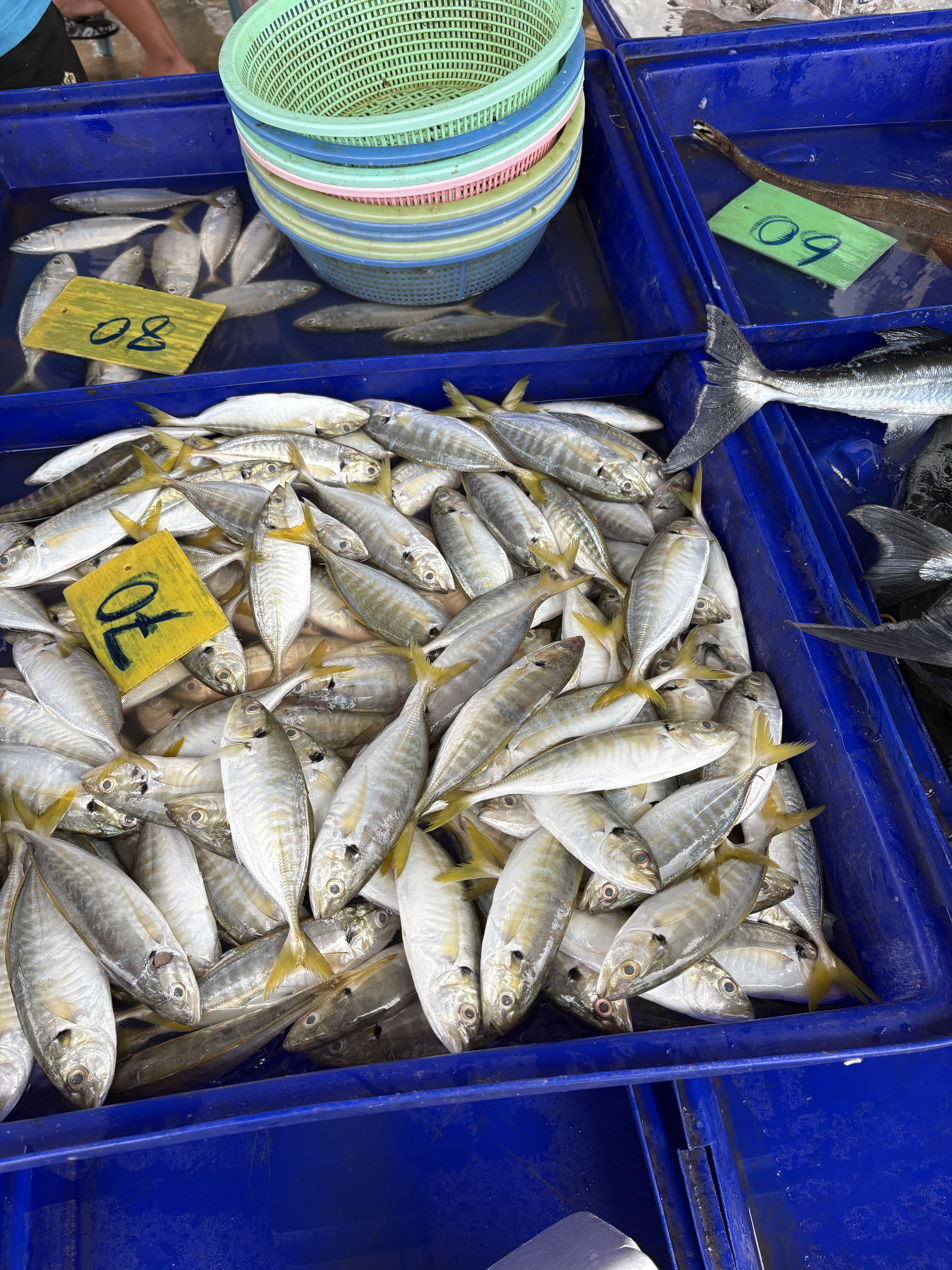
A catch of Yellowtail Scad sold in a wet market in Thailand

The yellowtail scad is widely distributed in the tropical and subtropical regions of the Indo-Pacific region. In the Indian Ocean, the species is known from as far south as South Africa, distributed north along the east African coast including Madagascar, and further north to the Persian Gulf, Red Sea, India, Sri Lanka and Southeast Asia. In the Pacific, the species is most prevalent in Southeast Asia, Indonesia, Philippines, extending southward to northern Australia, north to Japan, where only three specimens have been recorded, and as far east as Hawaii.

The species is predominantly coastal, schooling in inshore waters to a depth of 80 m, often in large embayments with mangroves or over coral reefs. Like a number of carangids, juvenile yellowtail scad are known to congregate around floating objects, including jellyfish medusae, as well as manmade structures. In Kaneohe Bay, jellyfish medusae disappeared from the bay, causing the fish to switch from natural objects to manmade ones, causing concern for recruitment of the species in the future.

== Biology ==
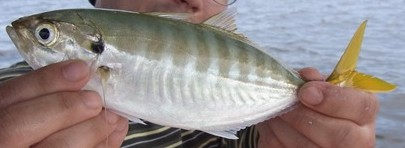
Yellowtail scad are often taken by nets

The yellowtail scad is a pelagic predator that takes a variety of small plankton and fish. The species exhibits two different feeding patterns during different stages of life, with the juveniles between 91 and 150 mm feeding mainly on crustaceans while adults over 151 mm prey almost exclusively on small fish.

The size at sexual maturity is not known confidently but has been estimated at between 150 and 160 mm. In Hawaii, the species has been observed to spawn in open areas of bays at least 10 m deep mostly between March and October, but there is significant yearly differences in the length of the season. In the breeding stock, more than two-thirds are male and all females in the bay during daytime actively spawn, with nearly all spawning occurring in the morning. Females release 63,000 to 161,000 eggs per batch. Egg and larvae development have been extensively studied and described by Miller and Sumida.

== Relationship to humans ==
Yellowtail scad are a major species targeted by fisheries throughout the species range. Worldwide catch data are not available, although the FAO has catch data from Saudi Arabia showing 933 tonnes of the species was taken in 2001; an increase from 2000's catch of 875 tonnes.

In Malaysia and presumably other South East Asian countries, the species makes up a high percentage of the pelagic catch. The fishery appears to be seasonal in some areas, with demersal species such as serranids and lutjanids making up the bulk of the catch most of the year while pelagics such as A. mate and scombrids make up the bulk of the catch between January and April. In other areas such as the Gulf of Thailand, it is taken year round. The species is taken by a variety of fishing methods including beach seines, gill netting, as well as hook and line methods involving jigging with lures. In parts of South East Asia, the yellowtail scad is a highly valued seafood prepared by boiling, steaming and frying. It may also by dried and salted to preserve the flesh.

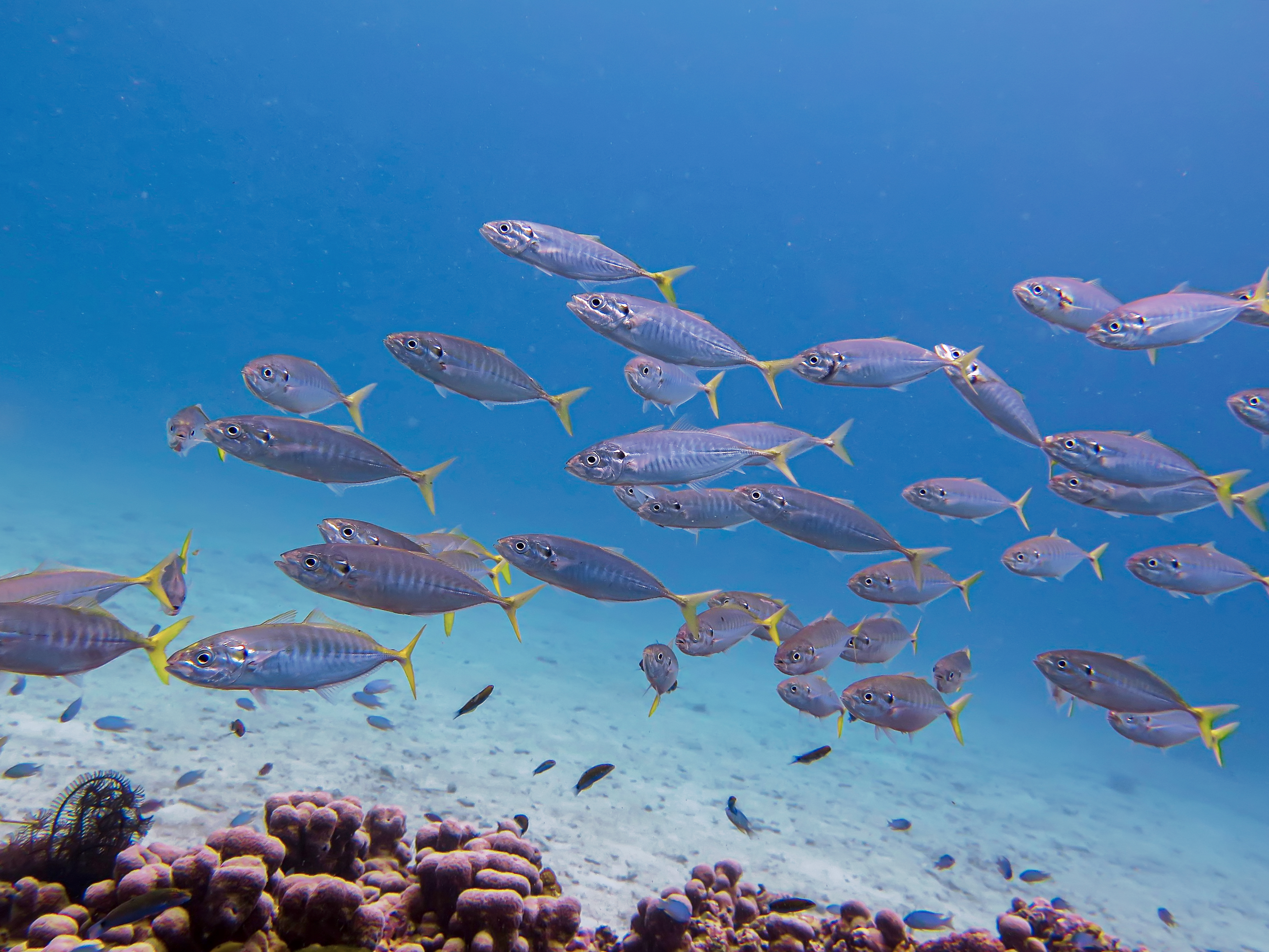
The Yellowtail Scad (*Atule mate*) plays a crucial role in marine ecosystems and human economies. Valued as a food source, it supports small-scale fisheries and recreational fishing.
