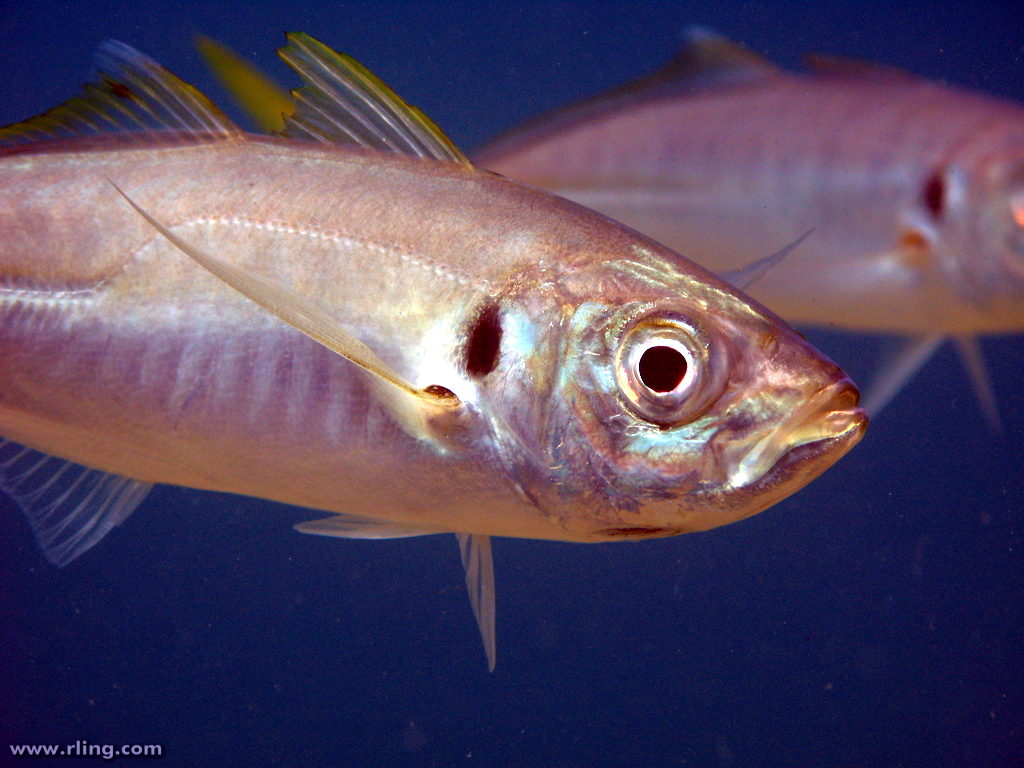

Conservation status
- Least Concern (IUCN 3.1)

Scientific classification
- Kingdom: Animalia
- Phylum: Chordata
- Class: Actinopterygii
- Order: Carangiformes
- Suborder: Carangoidei
- Family: Carangidae
- Genus: Trachurus
- Species: T. novaezelandiae

Binomial name
- Trachurus novaezelandiae J. Richardson, 1843

= Yellowtail horse mackerel =

Species of fish

The yellowtail horse mackerel (Trachurus novaezelandiae), also known as yakka, is a jack in the family Carangidae found around Australia and New Zealand at depths to 500 m. Its length is up to 50 centimetres (20 in).

The fish is sometimes called yellowtail scad, but this more commonly refers to Atule mate.

== Description ==
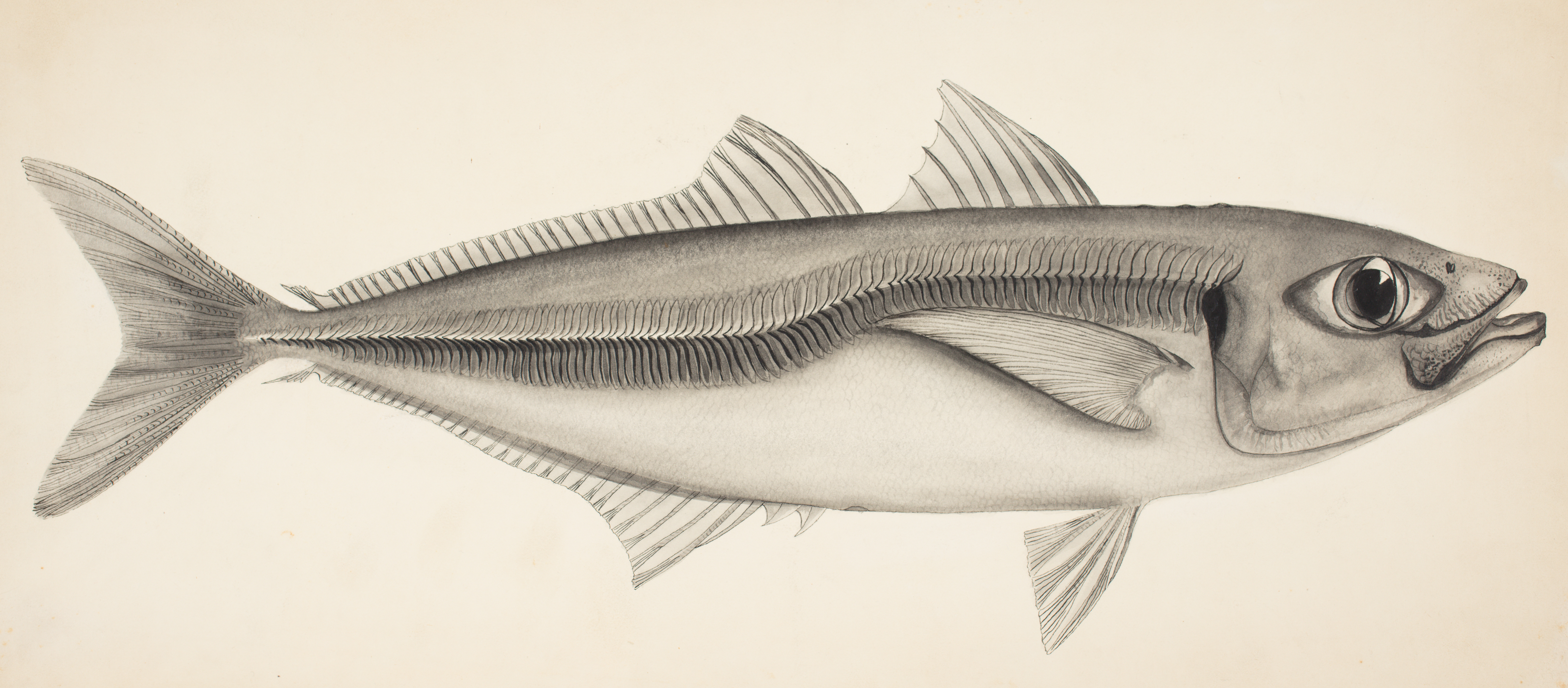
1931 illustration by Louis Thomas Griffin

The body profile of the yellowtail horse mackerel is a moderately compressed, oval shape body. The yellowtail horse mackerel is very similar to the greenback horse mackerel, but has 68 to 73 lateral line scutes, compared with 76 to 82 for the greenback horse mackerel. The coloration of the yellowtail horse mackerel is a bright olive green above, transitioning to a more golden green ventrally, before becoming silvery white on the underside of the fish. Nine to 16 faint grey bars run vertically on the sides of the fish, as well as a black spot slightly smaller than the eye on the upper margin of the operculum and adjacent shoulder region.

In some parts of Australia, the Yakka are prone to the parasite Cymothoa exigua which first eats and then replaces the tongue of the host fish. The parasite does not otherwise harm the fish and has no effect on humans. The parasite should however be removed before consumption.

== Distribution and habitat ==
Adult yellowtail horse mackerels are found in coastal waters and estuaries, showing a preference for waters less than 150 metres (490 ft) deep and no cooler than 13 °C (55 °F). They are frequently encountered on the bottom or in midwater but are only infrequently recorded near the surface, they occur in large schools. Adults are normally recorded over rocky reefs just offshore while the juveniles prefer waters with shallow, soft substrates.

== Diet ==
The yellowtail scad is a pelagic predator that takes a variety of small plankton and fish. The species exhibits two different feeding patterns during different stages of life, with the juveniles between 91 and 150 mm feeding mainly on crustaceans while adults over 151 mm prey almost exclusively on small fish.

== Relationship to humans ==
This species can be sold fresh, smoked, canned and frozen; and it can be cooked by frying, broiling and baking. It is a relatively long lived species for its size, living up to 15 years, and is exploited by commercial and recreational fisheries. In New South Wales the catch per annum since 1997 has been between 300 and 500 tonnes but much of the catch is discarded or used as bait.
