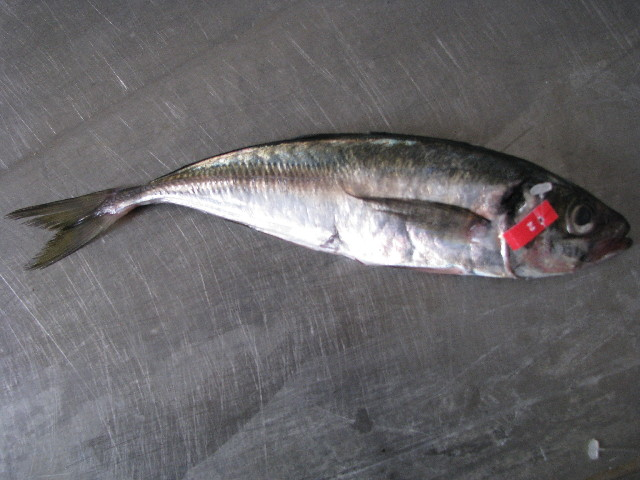

Conservation status
- Least Concern (IUCN 3.1)

Scientific classification
- Kingdom: Animalia
- Phylum: Chordata
- Class: Actinopterygii
- Division: Teleostei
- Order: Carangiformes
- Suborder: Carangoidei
- Family: Carangidae
- Genus: Trachurus
- Species: T. capensis

Binomial name
- Trachurus capensis Castelnau, 1861

= Cape horse mackerel =

Species of fish

The Cape horse mackerel (Trachurus capensis) is a mackerel-like species in the family Carangidae. It is a pelagic species of the southeastern Atlantic Ocean, which is a target of fisheries, mainly as bycatch.

== Description ==
The Cape horse mackerel has an elongated, slightly compressed, body with a large head. It has no distinctive markings apart from a small, black spot on the edge of its operculum near the upper angle. The dorsal part of the body and head are dark and can be dusky, almost black or grey to bluish green in colour while the flanks, belly, and head are usually paler, varying from whitish to silvery. Their maximum reported length is 60 cm, with a common length of 30 cm.

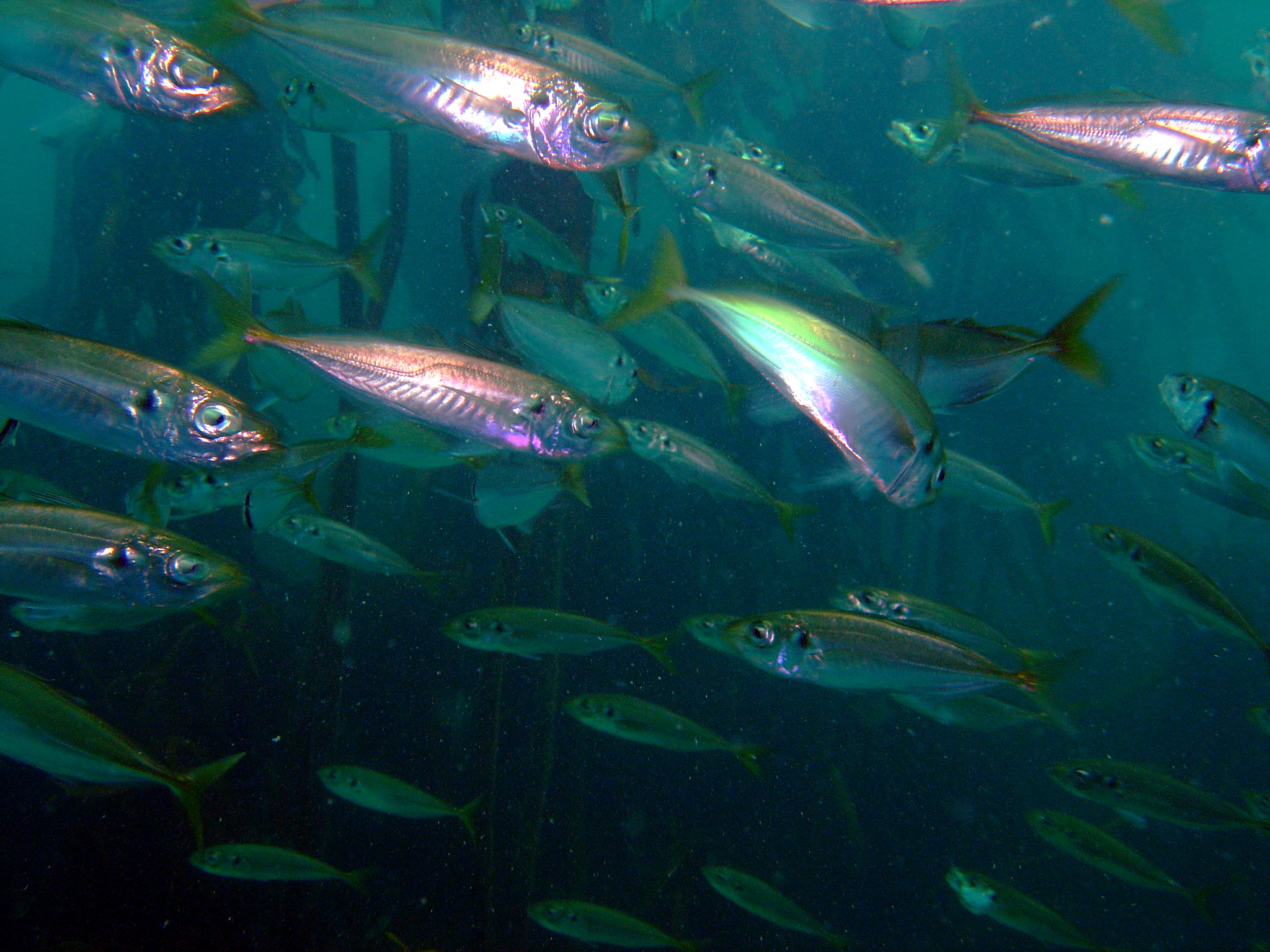
Cape horse mackerel at Pyramid Rock Reef

== Distribution ==
The Cape horse mackerel is found in the southeastern Atlantic from the Gulf of Guinea to eastern South Africa. It is largely restricted to the Benguela current from southern Angola to southern South Africa.

== Habitat and biology ==
Cape horse mackerel adults are found mainly over the continental shelf, especially where there is a substrate of sand. The shoals rise to the surface waters at night to feed and remain near to the bottom during the day. The juveniles prey mostly on copepods while the adults feed on fishes and a wider variety of invertebrates.

== Taxonomy ==
Trachurus capensis is considered to be a subspecies of the Atlantic horse mackerel (Trachurus trachurus) by some authorities, but it is thought that there is no adequate series of this specimens of these taxa along the coast of Africa available to confirm the validity of this taxon.

== Fisheries ==
Cape horse mackerel is a bycatch species in the offshore demersal trawl, which operates mainly off the waters of the Western Cape at depths of 110 m and deeper. The offshore demersal trawl fishery operates using trawl nets, which are dragged behind the boat along the ocean floor at depths from 110 to 800 m. Cape horse mackerel caught in the midwater trawl fishery are considered to be more sustainable than those caught in the offshore trawl fishery (see Cape horse mackerel assessment for midwater trawl). This fishery primarily targets deepwater hake (Merluccius paradoxus) on soft, sandy bottoms, as well as commercially valuable bycatch species such as kingklip (Genypterus capensis) and monkfish (Lophius vomerinus). Although trawling is a highly unselective fishing method, offshore fishing grounds are not generally very biodiverse (i.e., they are only inhabited by a few species), and the discard rate for this fishery is estimated to be 10% of the total catch. However, this fishing method is likely to have significant impacts on bottom habitats, and concerns are expressed around the number of seabird mortalities caused during trawling (estimated at 8000 per year). The hake component of the offshore demersal trawl fishery has been certified by the Marine Stewardship Council since 2004, and the current management system for this fishery employs a number of ecosystem-based management measures which address issues such as bycatch, closed areas, and benthic habitat impacts. The Cape horse mackerel is managed in terms of a maximum precautionary catch Limit (MPCL). The MPCL has been maintained at 44 000 tonnes in recent years and accommodates both mid-water-directed and bycatch in the hake-directed demersal trawl sector. Juvenile horse mackerel are occasionally targeted on the West Coast, where a 5 000 tonne precautionary catch limit is enforced (the whole small pelagic sector is closed if the limit is exceeded). Despite the absence of direct evidence of ecosystem change, a potential for ecosystem impact exists, as this is an important small pelagic species and fills a similar ecosystem niche to other small pelagic species such as sardines and anchovy.

Global capture production of Cape horse mackerel (Trachurus capensis) in thousand tonnes from 1950 to 2022, as reported by the FAO
