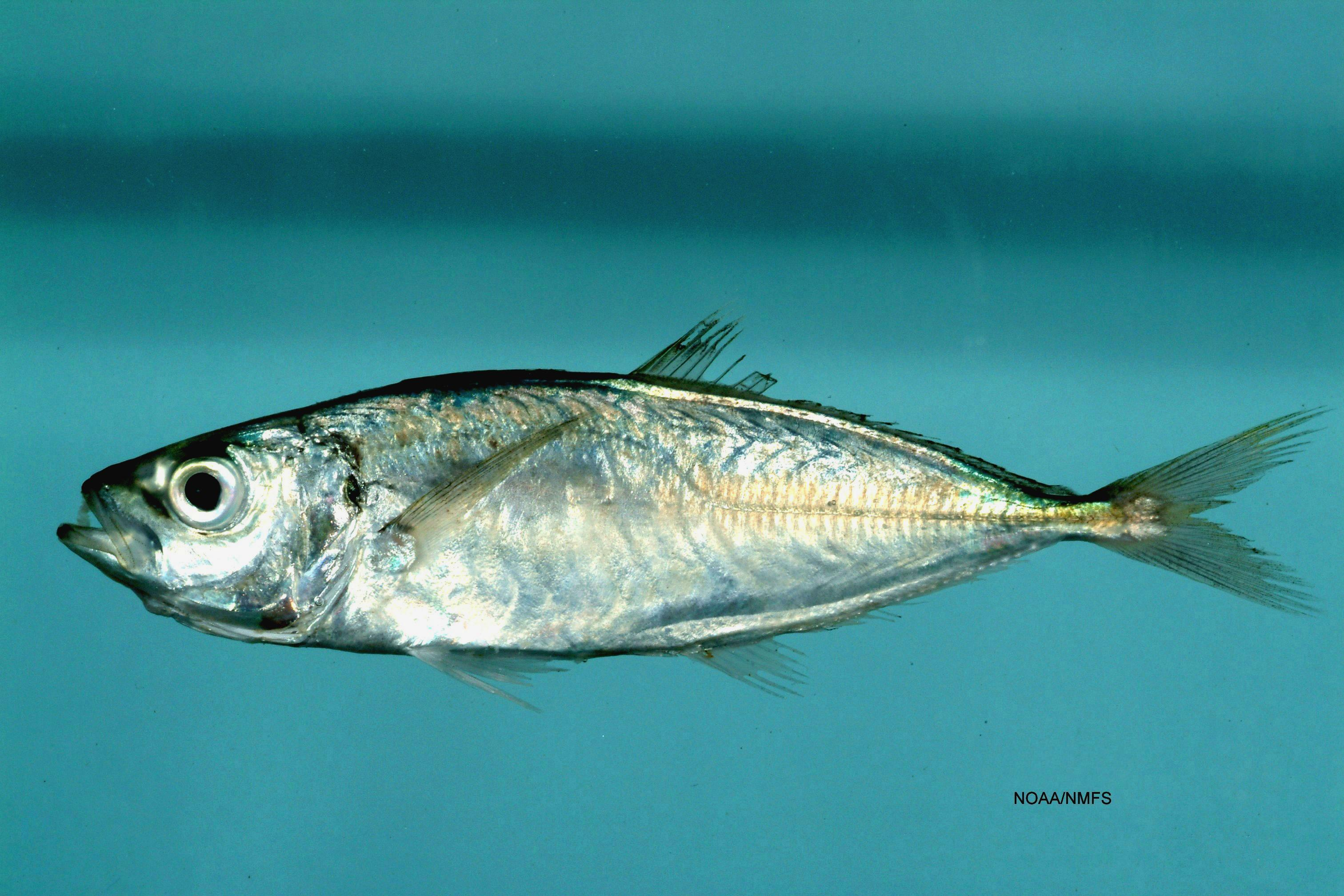

Conservation status
- Least Concern (IUCN 3.1)

Scientific classification
- Kingdom: Animalia
- Phylum: Chordata
- Class: Actinopterygii
- Order: Carangiformes
- Suborder: Carangoidei
- Family: Carangidae
- Genus: Trachurus
- Species: T. lathami

Binomial name
- Trachurus lathami (Nichols, 1920)

Synonyms
- Trachurus picturatus australis Nani, 1950

= Trachurus lathami =

Species of fish

Trachurus lathami is a species of fish in the family Carangidae and the genus Trachurus, the jack mackerels. Common names include rough scad and horse mackerel in English, as well as chinchard frappeur (French), chicharro garretón (Spanish), jurel (in Argentina and Uruguay), and carapau, garaçuma, surel, and xixarro (in Brazil). It is native to parts of the western Atlantic Ocean, including seas off the eastern coasts of North and South America and the Gulf of Mexico.

== Description ==
This species reaches up to about 40 cm in maximum length, but most individuals are about 30. It is around 12 cm long when it reaches maturity. Its maximum weight is about 500 g. It is elongated in shape and somewhat laterally compressed. It is covered in cycloid scales, a thin, overlapping scale type. The body is blue dorsally and silver and white ventrally. A black spot occurs on the edge of the operculum, with a dark tinge to the nose, the edges of the dorsal fin, and the tail fin. The other fins are pale. The eye is large and has an eyelid.

== Habitat and biology ==
This marine fish lives mainly in coastal waters, where it is pelagic, cruising in the water column, and demersal, living along the seabed on the continental shelves. It is a reef fish. It can be found at ocean depths between 30 and 200 m. It can be found in shallower waters if conditions are tolerable; in 2009, it was recorded in Mar Chiquita, a lagoon in Argentina.

Its diet is made up of invertebrates such as copepods, including those of the genera Calanoides, Candacia, Centropages, Corycaeus, Eucalanus, and Oncaea, and the species Temora stylifera and Calanopia americana. It eats euphausiid krill, chaetognaths, diastylid crustaceans such as Anchistylis and Diastylis species, and lucifer prawns, crab larvae, and crustacean eggs. It is not limited to invertebrates; it is known to eat fish and their eggs. The feeding pattern of the fish is apparently driven by a circadian rhythm, with feeding occurring at specific times in the afternoon and night.

The fish often schools. In some areas, the juvenile is often found with the jellyfish Chrysaora lactea, with which it can find protection from predators. Several juveniles at once may shelter under the umbrella of the jellyfish, where they may be protected by the tentacles, or hide behind the umbrella, using it as a shield. When away from the jellyfish, it is sometimes eaten by the comb grouper (Mycteroperca acutirostris). The grouper is known to follow the jellyfish, waiting for the scads to come out. The fish is prey for many other animals, as well. It made up the majority of the diet of the yellowtail amberjack (Seriola lalandi) in one survey.

=== Parasites ===
Studies of the parasite load carried by the fish reveal it may be infested with the digenean flatworms Aponurus laguncula and Ectenurus virgulus, the monogenean flatworm Pseudaxine trachuri, a Corynosoma worm, many larval nematodes, the tapeworm Grillotia carvajalregorum, and several copepods, such as Caligus mutabilis, Lernanthropus trachuri, and Tuxophorus caligodes.

== Distribution ==
The range of the fish extends from Canada to Argentina. It is present in the Gulf of Mexico, but it is uncommon in the West Indies. It has been found to be abundant on the shelf outside the Río de la Plata estuary at the Argentina–Uruguay border, and along the coast of southern Brazil.

== Fisheries ==
This species is commercially fished for food.

== Taxonomy and naming ==
Trachurus lathami was formally described by John Treadwell Nichols in 1920 with its type locality given as Orient, Long Island, Suffolk County, New York. The specific name honours the collectors of the type, the Long Island farmer and amateur naturalist Roy Latham (1881–1979).
