= Gastrocotyle (flatworm) =

Scientific classification
- Kingdom: Animalia
- Phylum: Platyhelminthes
- Class: Monogenea
- Order: Mazocraeidea
- Family: Gastrocotylidae
- Genus: Gastrocotyle; Van Beneden & Hesse, 1863

Genus of flatworms

Gastrocotyle is a genus of flatworms belonging to the family Gastrocotylidae.

The species of this genus are found in Europe and Northern America.

Species:

- Gastrocotyle buckleyi Gupta & Krishna, 1980
- Gastrocotyle indica Subhapradha, 1951
- Gastrocotyle kurra Unnithan, 1968
- Gastrocotyle mozambiquensis Lebedev & Galkina, 1975
- Gastrocotyle trachuri Van Beneden & Hesse, 1863
