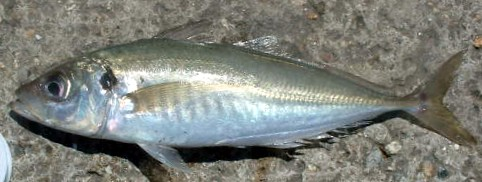

Conservation status
- Vulnerable (IUCN 3.1)

Scientific classification
- Kingdom: Animalia
- Phylum: Chordata
- Class: Actinopterygii
- Division: Teleostei
- Order: Carangiformes
- Suborder: Carangoidei
- Family: Carangidae
- Genus: Trachurus
- Species: T. trachurus

Binomial name
- Trachurus trachurus (Linnaeus, 1758)

Synonyms
- Scomber trachurus Linnaeus, 1758; Caranx trachurus (Linnaeus, 1758); Trachurus vulgaris Fleming, 1828; Trachurus europaeus Gronow, 1854

= Atlantic horse mackerel =

Species of fish

The Atlantic horse mackerel (Trachurus trachurus), also known as the European horse mackerel or common scad, is a species of jack mackerel in the family Carangidae, which includes the jacks, pompanos and trevallies. It is found in the eastern Atlantic Ocean off Europe and Africa and into the south-eastern Indian Ocean. It is an important species in commercial fisheries and is listed as a Vulnerable species on The IUCN Red List of Threatened Species.

== Description ==
The Atlantic horse mackerel has quite a slender, quite compressed body with a large head in which the rear of the upper jaw reaches the front of the eye and the lower jaw projects beyond the upper jaw. The eye has a well developed adipose eyelid. It has two dorsal fins, the first is tall and has seven thin spines, with the final spine being much shorter than the others. The second dorsal fin is separated from the first by a narrow gap and is considerably longer than the first with 29–33 soft rays. The anal fin is about as long as the second dorsal fin and there are two separate spines at its anterior end. The moderately sized pelvic fin has a single spine and five soft rays and has its origin below the end of the pectoral fin base. A curved line of 33–40 bony scutes runs from the head to the tail, each having a small spine which increase in size and become bonier towards the tail. The lateral line has a total of 66–67 scales, of which 31–36 are scutes. It is dark blue in colour with silvery flanks and a white belly, there is a dark spot on the operculum. This species attains a maximum fork length of 60 centimetres (24 in), although they are normally around 25 cm (10 in) and a weight of 1.5 kg (3 lb).

== Distribution ==
The Atlantic horse mackerel occurs in the north and eastern Atlantic Ocean, the Mediterranean Sea and Sea of Marmara and the Black Sea. In the Atlantic it is found from Norway to South Africa where it may extend around the Cape of Good Hope along the southern African Indian Ocean coast Maputo in Mozambique. However, if Trachurus capensis is considered to be a valid species then this species is restricted to the north east Atlantic. It has been recorded in Cape Verde but is thought to occur there only as a vagrant.

== Habitat and biology ==
The Atlantic horse mackerel is a benthopelagic species which normally occurs over sandy substrates at depths of 100–200 m (50–110 fathoms; 330–660 ft), although it has been reported as deep as 1,050 m (570 fathoms; 3,440 ft) and it is sometimes found nearer the surface waters. It is a migratory species, moving northwards in the summer months and returning southwards when the sea temperature starts to fall. In the north east Atlantic two stocks are recognised, the western stock spawns in a wide area from Ireland to the Bay of Biscay in the early Spring and moves northward to the southern coasts of Norway and the northern North Sea in the summer. The North Sea stock spawns in the southern part of the North Sea during the summer and then migrates northwards into the central North Sea, the Skagerrak and the Kattegat. Off Mauritania this species has its main spawning season in November to January while the related Cunene horse mackerel (Trachurus trecae) spawns in June and August. Off Ireland spawning occurs irregularly during the summer from June to August reaching its peak in July. The females spawn in batches, each of up to 140,000 eggs and hatching larvae 5 mm (3/16 in) in length. Spawning is indeterminate meaning that the total number of eggs a female can produce is dependent on factors which can change over the course of a spawning season. The eggs and larvae are pelagic.

The juveniles of thus species frequently shoal with other fish species' juveniles, mainly Atlantic herring (Clupea clupea) and with other species of horse mackerels such as the Mediterranean horse mackerel (T. mediterraneus) and blue jack mackerel (T. picturatus). Juveniles are also often encountered sheltering in the tentacles of jellyfish. In South Africa the maximum recorded age is 24 years while 40 years of age has been recorded in the northeast Atlantic. They are thought to breed from two to four years old for females. Off Mauritania, the juveniles are caught at depths of 200–300 m (110–160 fathoms; 660–980 ft) while mature fish are taken in shallower waters of less than 100 m (55 fathoms; 330 ft).The age and growth of the Atlantic horse mackerel vary across its extensive range and are affected by the levels to which stocks are exploited.

The diet of this species, in both juveniles and adults, is copepods, shrimps, small fishes and squids. An examination of the stomach contents of Atlantic horse mackerels caught in the Aegean Sea recorded a total of 60 different prey species which belonged to five major systematic groups, polychaetes, crustaceans, molluscs, arrow worms and bony fish. Copepods, Euphasids and Mysids made up the highest percentage of food eaten. Bony fish were the secondmost numerous food ingested, while polychaeta and arrow worms were infrequently recorded food items. The diet showed very little seasonal variation with copepods and mysids making up the largest proportion of prey throughout the year, with fishes being most frequent prey except in the spring. Larger fish – those over 16.9 cm (6 5/8 in) – feed largely on the larvae of bony fishes. No less than 45 species of copeopod were identified in this study, and Acartia clausi and Oncea media were numerous and important throughout the year. Crustaceans were the most important prey to be eaten by this species in all seasons, however, bony fish were the most important prey items for larger fish.

== Taxonomy and naming ==
The Atlantic horse mackerel is the type species of the genus Trachurus but when Constantine Samuel Rafinesque created the genus in 1810 he used Trachurus saurus as the type species but Carolus Linnaeus had used the name Scomber saurus and had already described Scomber trachurus so Rafinesque's name was invalid. The genus Trachurus is part of the subfamily Caranginae of the family Carangidae, which is the largest family in the order Carangiformes. The generic and specific names are a compound of the Greek trachys meaning "rough" and oura meaning "tail"; this appears to be an ancient name for horse mackerels, presumably in reference to the spiny scutes on the caudal peduncle.

The common name horse mackerel has been said to derive from the belief that other fishes rode on its back but it may derive from the old Dutch word Horsmakreel which means a mackerel which spawns over a shallow or bank, a hors, and this was taken into English as "horse mackerel".

The Cape horse mackerel (Trachurus capensis) is held by some authorities to be the subspecies T. trachurus capensis of the Atlantic horse mackerel, and it is thought that no adequate series of these specimens of this taxon along the coast of Africa is available to confirm the validity of this taxon.

== Fisheries ==
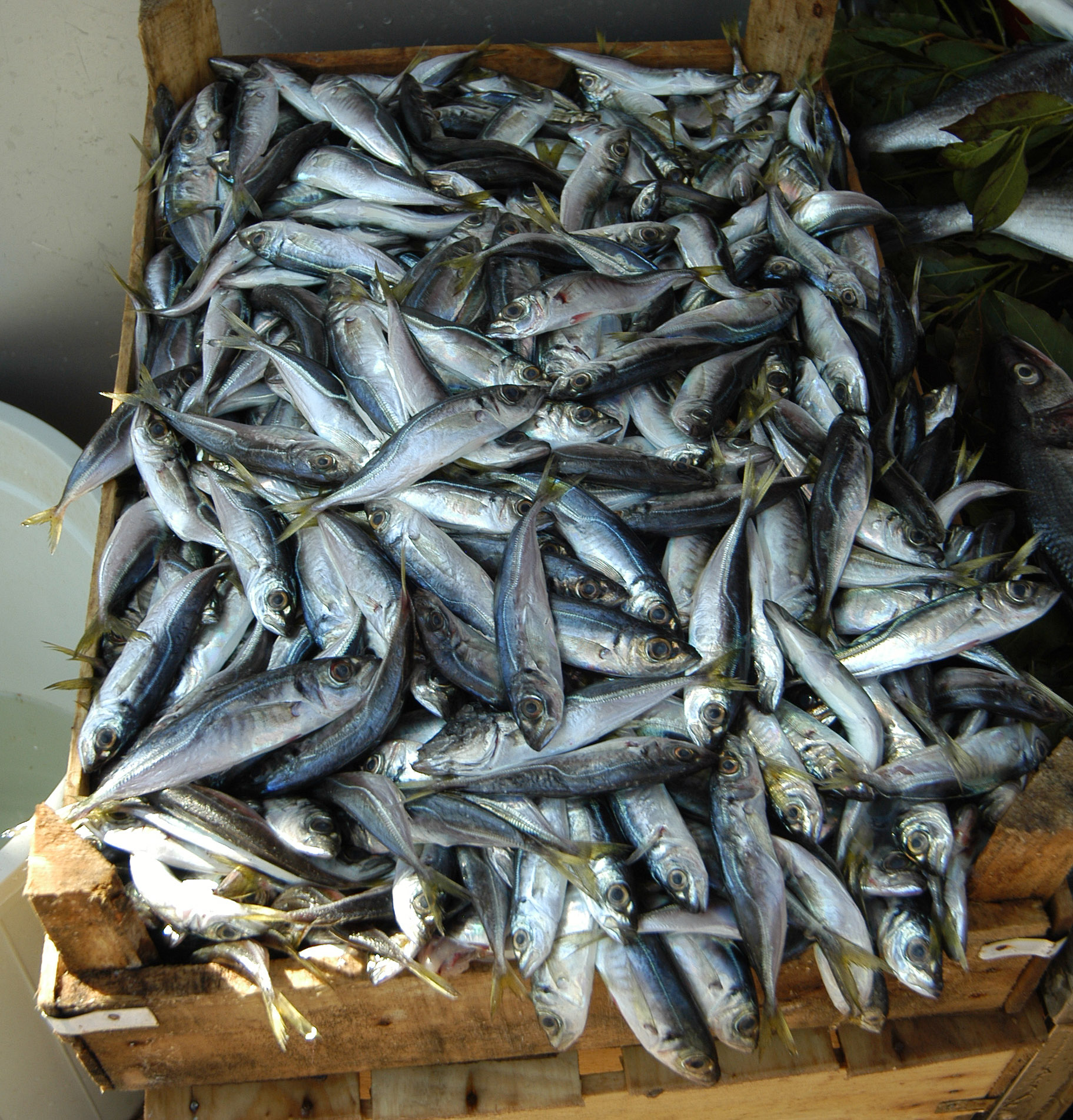
Trachurus trachurus catch

Global capture production of Atlantic horse mackerel (Trachurus trachurus) in thousand tonnes from 1950 to 2022, as reported by the FAO

The Atlantic horse mackerel is fished for commercially using trawls, longlines, purse seines (using artificial light), traps and on line gear. In 1999 the Food and Agriculture Organization stated that the total catch reported to it was 322 207 tonnes with the largest catches being in the Netherlands and in Ireland. There is a total allowable catch (TAC) in the North Sea for this species and landings have consistently been below this level but the TAC is not in line with the scientific advice. There have been calls to create a management plan for the Atlantic horse mackerel in the North Sea but currently there are no specific management objectives for it. The stock needs to be assessed and management objectives should be set before the fishery can be shown to be sustainable.

== Conservation ==
The IUCN classifies the Atlantic horse mackerel as Vulnerable because, even though there has been no decline in the population in European waters, greater than ninety percent declines off the West African coast mean this species has undergone a decline of at least 35–40% over the past three generation lengths, estimated at 30–35 years. The International Council for the Exploration of the Sea (ICES) classifies the population of this species as below the safe biological limit for exploitation. The populations are experiencing a slow decline with increased fishing pressure at the maximum sustainable yield since 2006 with low recruitment since 2004.

== Human uses ==
The Atlantic horse mackerel is consumed fresh. It may be preserved by freezing, salting and drying, smoking and canning. It can be prepared by frying, broiling or baking. The flesh is said to have a pleasant flavour with an oily delicate texture which is a good source of omega-3 fatty acids. Nutritionally 100g of the flesh of the Atlantic horse mackerel provides 97 kcal of energy and is made up of:

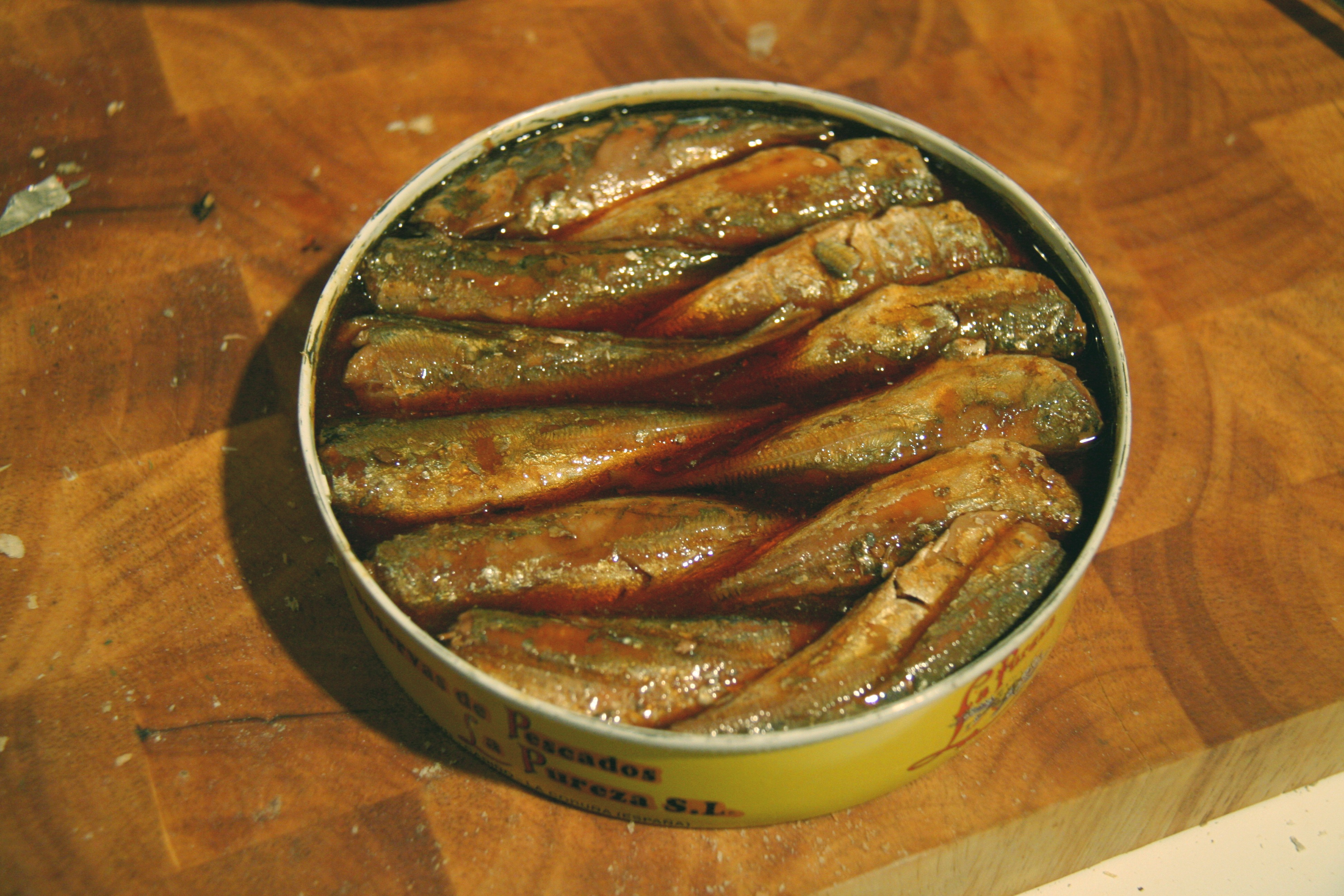
Chicharros en escabeche

- Water: 77.4 g
- Protein: 19.8 g
- Fat: 2 g
- Cholesterol: 64.4 mg
- Total minerals: 1.3 g
- Phosphorus: 224 mg

In Iberia it may be prepared as an escabeche while some are exported to Japan as aji to be used in sushi. They are also an important ingredient in Sicilian cuisine.
