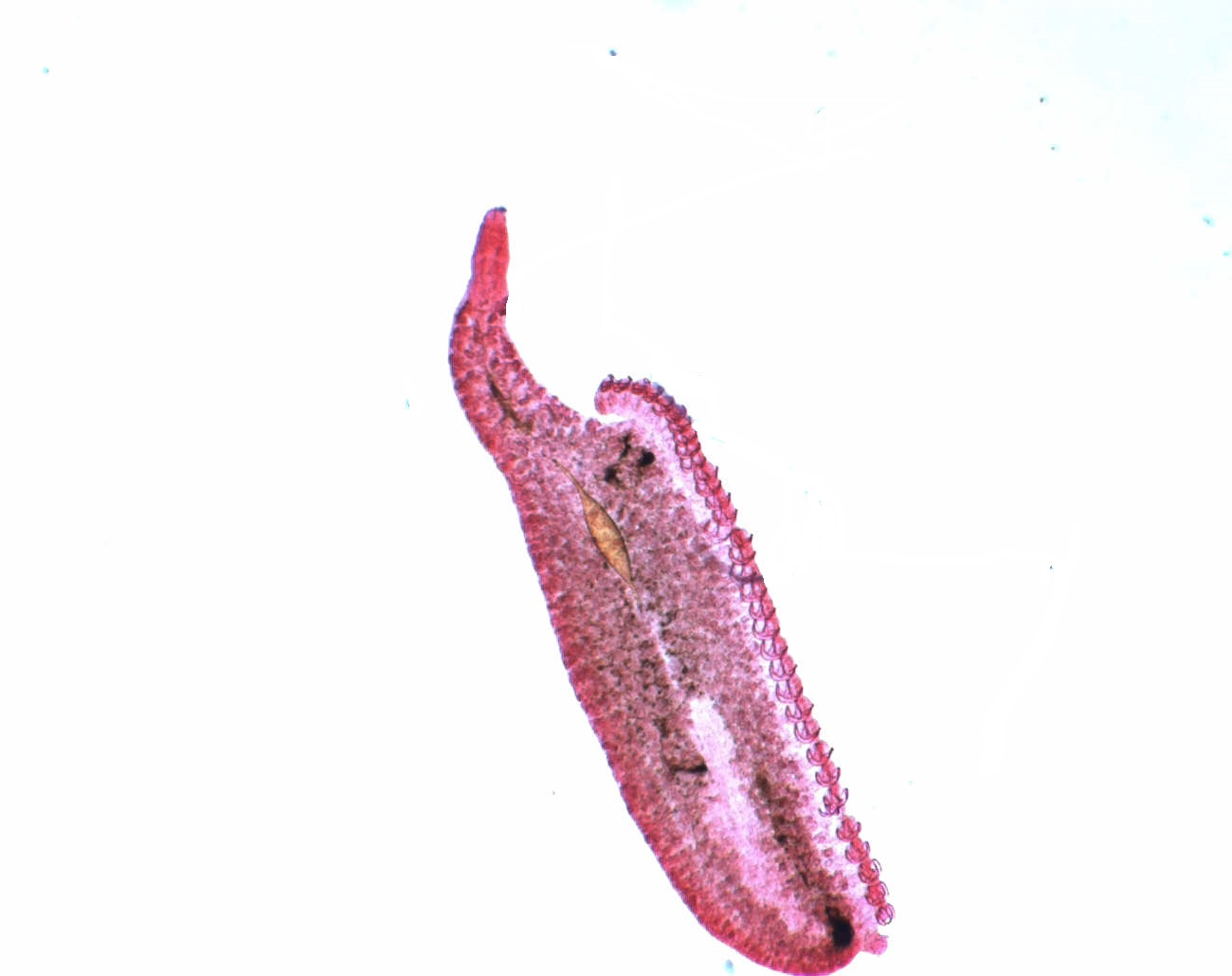
- Gastrocotyle trachuri

Scientific classification
- Kingdom: Animalia
- Phylum: Platyhelminthes
- Class: Monogenea
- Order: Mazocraeidea
- Family: Gastrocotylidae; Price, 1943

Subfamilies
- See text

= Gastrocotylidae =

Family of worms

Gastrocotylidae is a family of polyopisthocotylean monogeneans. All the species in this family are parasitic on fish.

== Systematics ==
The gastrocotylids are known by their rather very diffuse distribution, and a marqued preference for scombroid fishes and carangids.

The Gastrocotylidae Price, 1943 was erected to separate Gastrocotyle and its allies., named and described by reference to a diagram of the clamp type alone Sproston agreed on the importance of the difference in clamp structure in microcotylids, however, she reduced the Gastrocotylidae to sub-family status included in Microcotylidae Taschenberg, 1879. Palombi did not recognize Sproston's subfamily Gastrocotylinae and placed it in the subfamily Microcotylinae Monticelli, 1892 then in his own family Arreptocotylidae Palombi, 1949. This arrangement was refuted, and The Gastrocotylidae was brought back from the synonymy of Sproston in order to accommodate the subfamilies Gastrocotylinae Sproston, 1946 and Vallisiinae Price, 1943 and others which may later be adjudged similar. Price's name was employed for the family as the latest was recognizable, and Gastrocotyle Van Beneden & Hesse, 1863 was designated the type genus. Dawes and Chauhan also considered earlier Gastrocotylidaeas a valid and useful family. The latest valid genus included within this family is Allogastrocotyle Nasir & Fuentes Zambrano, 1984, erected by Nasir & Fuentes Zambrano, 1984 to accommodate Allogastrocotyle bivaginalis Nasir & Fuentes Zambrano, 1984, from the gills of Trachurus lathami off Venezuela.

== Subfamilies ==
According to Lebedev (1986) and the World Register of Marine Species, the family includes 2 subfamilies:

- Gastrocotylinae Sproston, 1946 including Pseudaxine.
- Gastrocotyloidinae Lebedev, 1984
