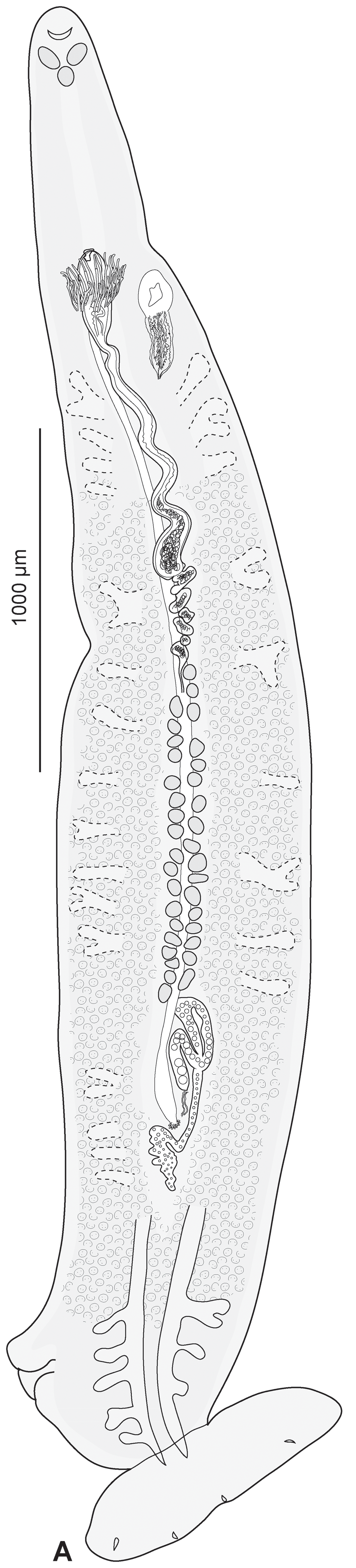
- Holotype of Lethacotyle vera Justine et al., 2013

Scientific classification
- Kingdom: Animalia
- Phylum: Platyhelminthes
- Class: Monogenea
- Order: Mazocraeidea
- Family: Protomicrocotylidae
- Genus: Lethacotyle
- Species: L. vera

Binomial name
- Lethacotyle vera Justine, Rahmouni, Gey, Schoelinck & Hoberg, 2013

= Lethacotyle vera =

Species of flatworm

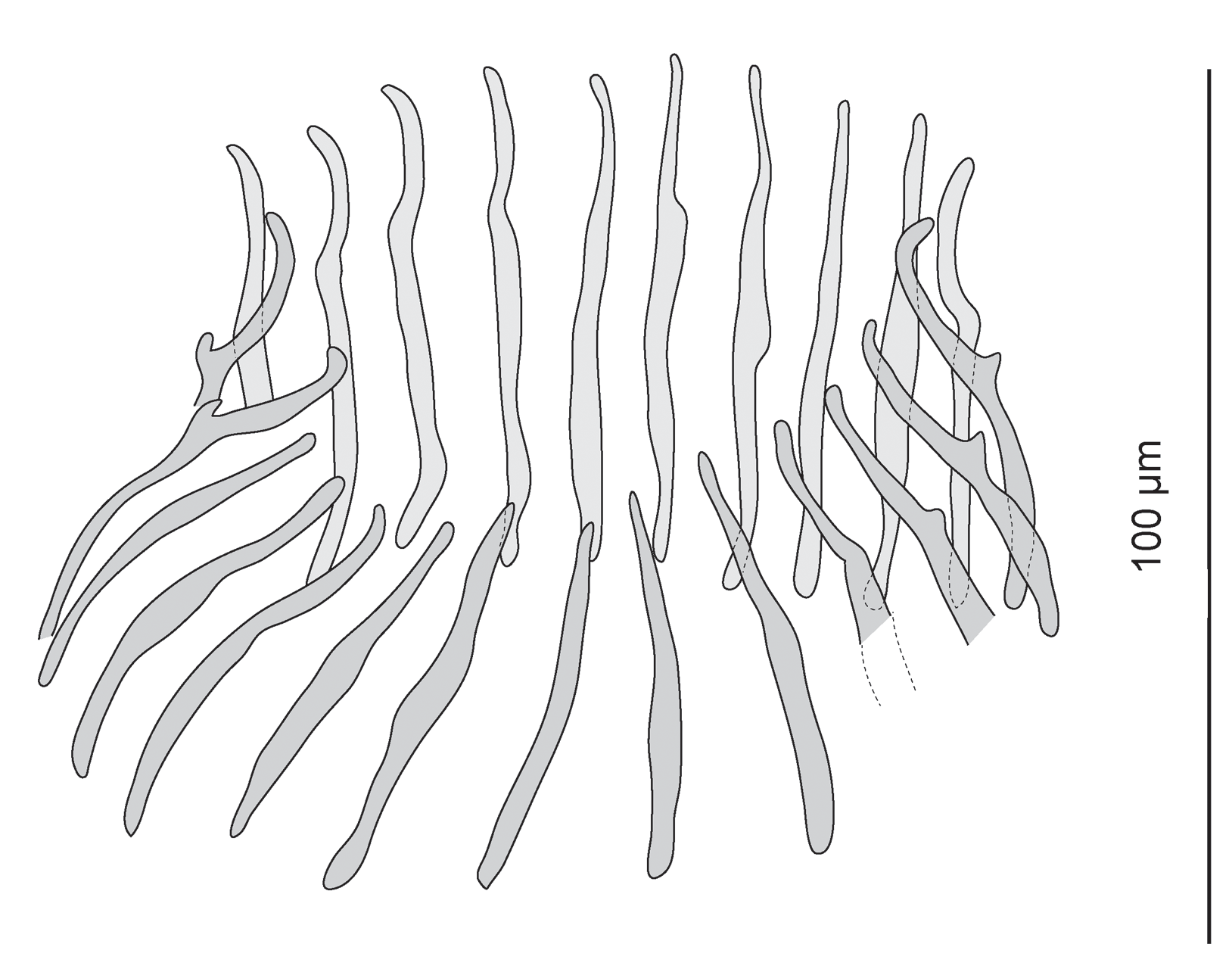
Spines of the male copulatory organ of Lethacotyle vera

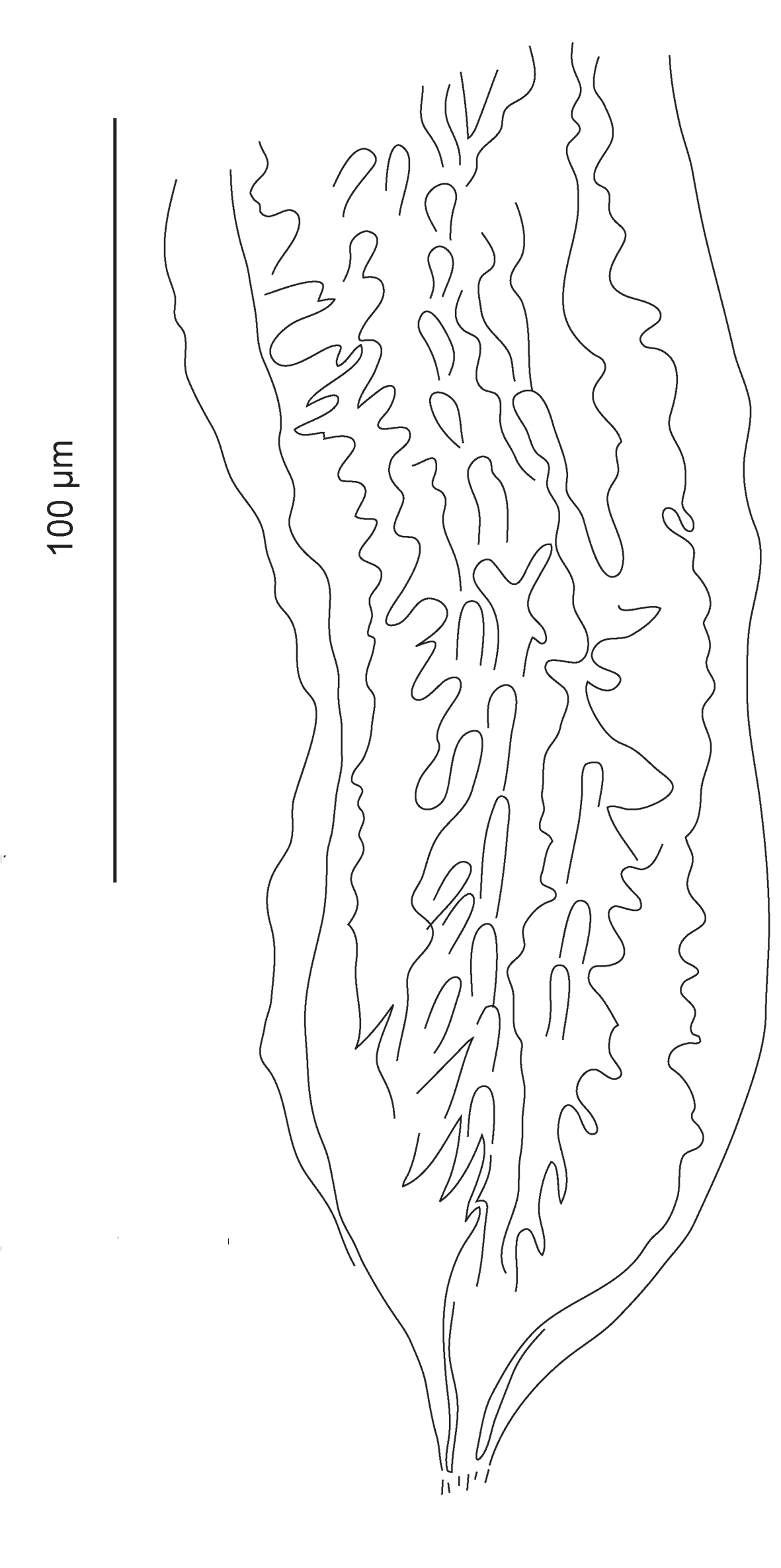
Sclerotised vagina of Lethacotyle vera

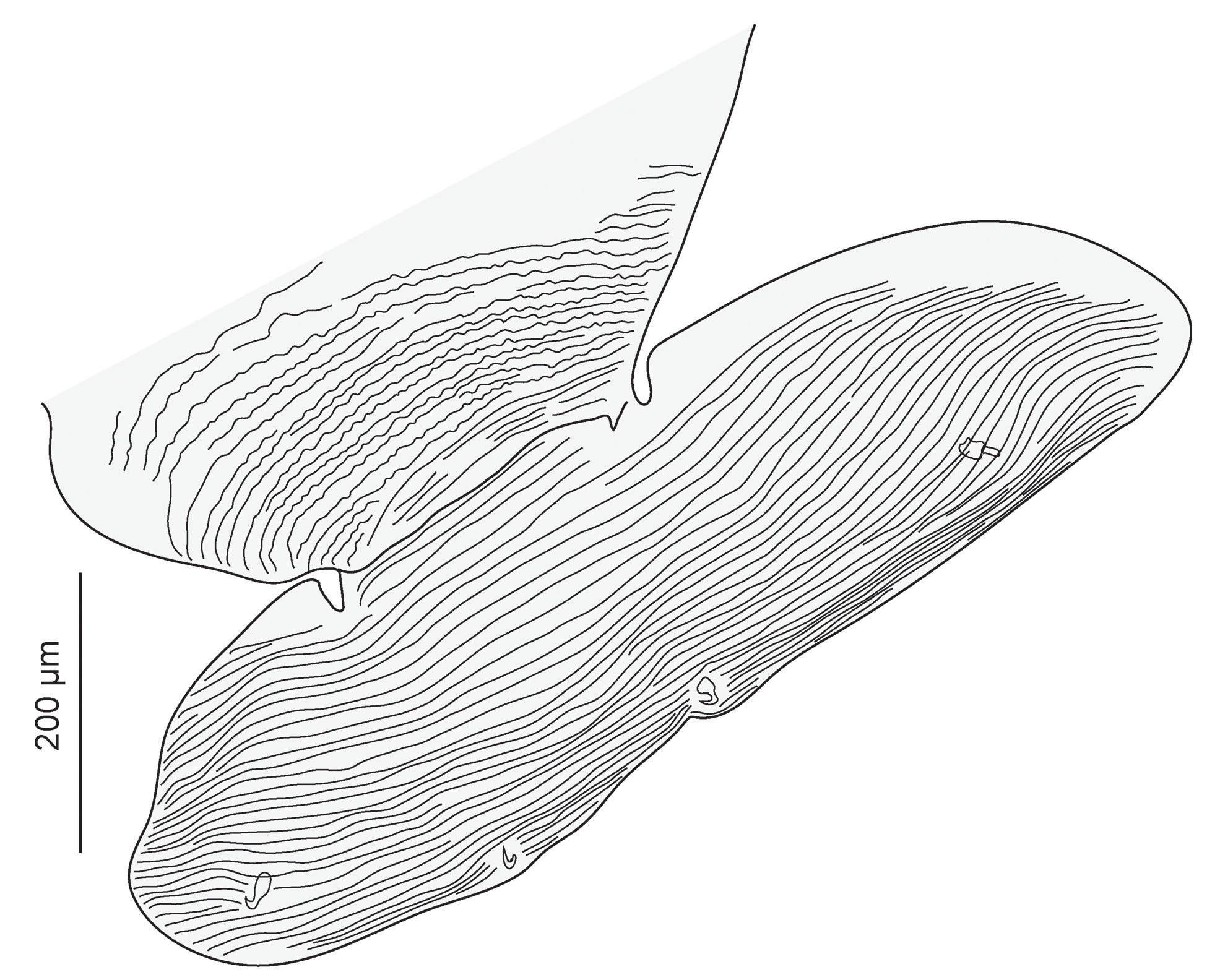
Posterior part of Lethacotyle vera; there are no clamps, but transverse striations are visible

Lethacotyle vera is a species of monogenean of the family Protomicrocotylidae.

The species is ectoparasitic on the gills of the brassy trevally, (Caranx papuensis), off New Caledonia and was found only in this locality. It is the second species of the genus Lethacotyle Manter & Prince, 1953 described after the type-species, Lethacotyle fijiensis Manter & Prince, 1953. The genus Lethacotyle is special in that its members have no clamps on their posterior attachment organ or haptor, in contrast to most polyopisthocotylean Monogeneans which have clamps.

The body of adult L. vera is 2.7-5.4 millimetres in length. The body is elongate, flat, with a pointed head showing two anterior suckers. There are numerous anterior testes and a single posterior ovary. The eggs bear two elongate filaments. The copulatory organs include a sclerotised cone-shaped vagina, 125-175 μm in length, and a male copulatory organ, comprising a ring of 21-27 spines which are 50 μm in length. The length of the spines of the male copulatory apparatus is the main diagnosis character of the species, which allows its separation from L. fijiensis, the only other species of the genus.

The posterior part of the body of L. vera is asymmetrical. It bears two lateral flaps and a terminal lappet which is striated, and there are no clamps - this is a characteristic of the genus Lethacotyle.

The etymology of the name of the species was, according to the authors of the taxon, "vera, Latin for true, because Lethacotyle, a genus differentiated by absence of clamps, was based on true observations".
