= Microcotyle pempheri =

Scientific classification
- Kingdom: Animalia
- Phylum: Platyhelminthes
- Class: Monogenea
- Order: Mazocraeidea
- Family: Microcotylidae
- Genus: Microcotyle
- Species: M. pempheri

Binomial name
- Microcotyle pempheri Machida & Azaki, 1977

Species of worms

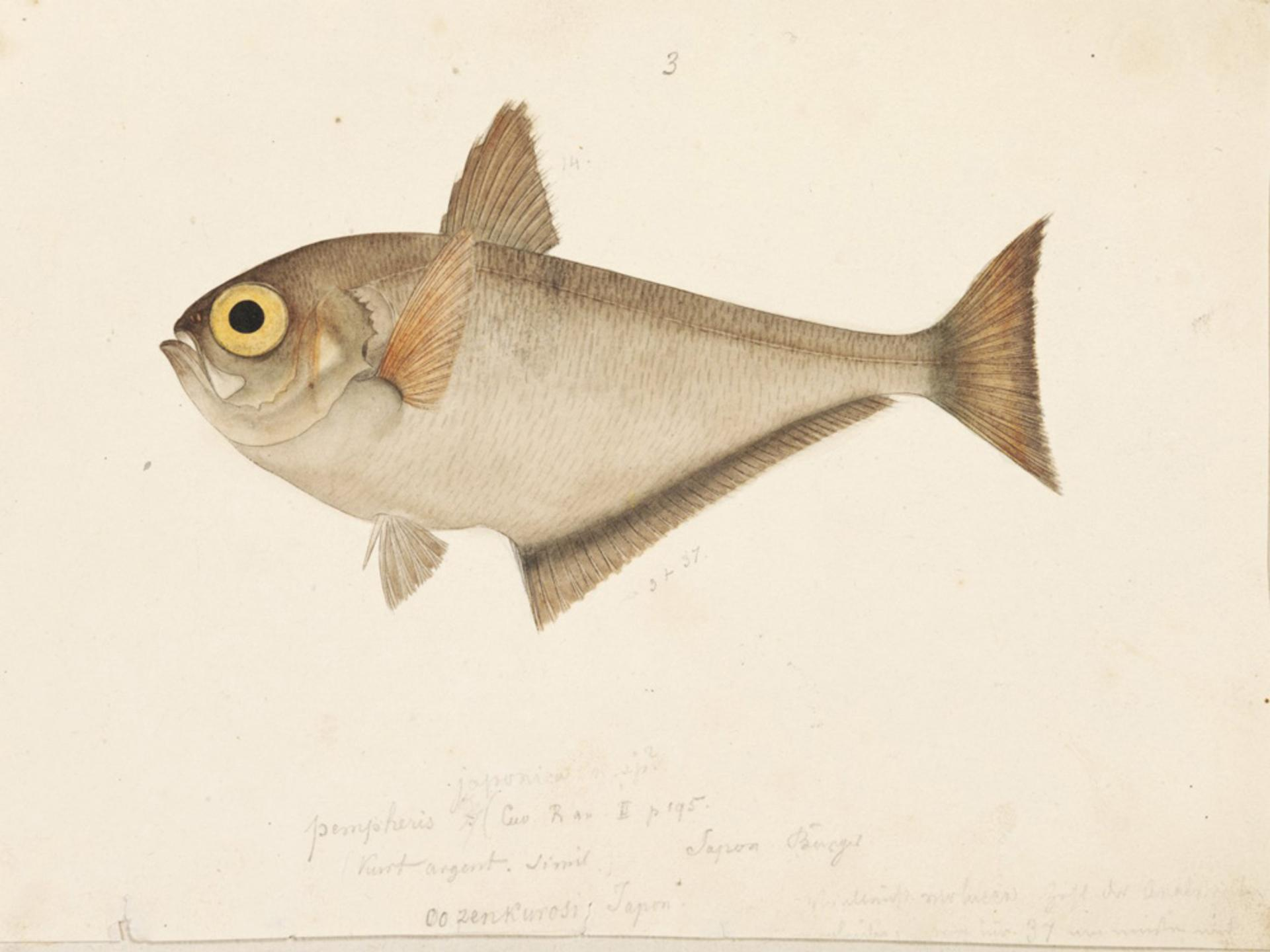
Pempheris xanthoptera is the type host of Microcotyle pempheri

Microcotyle pempheri is a species of monogenean, parasitic on the gills of a marine fish. It belongs to the family Microcotylidae.

== Taxonomy ==
Microcotyle pempheri was first described by Machida & Azaki in 1977, from the gills of Pempheris xanthoptera (Pempheridae) off southern Japan. The specific epithet pempheri is not explained in the original description but obviously derives from the generic name of the type host Pempheris xanthoptera.

== Description ==
Microcotyle pempheri has the general morphology of all species of Microcotyle, with an elongate body, comprising an anterior part which contains most organs and a posterior part called the haptor. The haptor is in form of an inverse triangle and bears 75-103 clamps, arranged as two rows, one on each side. The clamps of the haptor attach the animal to the gill of the fish. There are also two buccal suckers at the anterior extremity. The digestive organs include an anterior, terminal mouth, a globular to oval pharynx, a simple oesophagus bifurcating posteriorly to the genital pore and a posterior intestine with two branches provided with short lateral branches. Each adult contains male and female reproductive organs. The reproductive organs include an anterior large cup-shaped muscular genital atrium, densely armed with thornlike spines, a dorsal vagina opening some distance posteriorly to the genital pore, a single tubular ovary shaped like a question mark, vitellaria and 11-21 testes oval or irregular in shape. Eggs are fusiform, with a very long anterior filament and much shorter posterior filament.

The species can be distinguished from the most closely related species Microcotyle emmelichthyops Yamaguti, 1968 by the absence of a posterior chamber in the genital atrium, a smaller number of testes and the structure of the middle spring of the clamp.

== Hosts and localities ==
The type and only recorded host of the species is the sweeper, Pempheris xanthoptera (Pempheridae). The type locality is off Tanegashima Island, southern Japan.
