= Microcotyle polymixiae =

Scientific classification
- Kingdom: Animalia
- Phylum: Platyhelminthes
- Class: Monogenea
- Order: Mazocraeidea
- Family: Microcotylidae
- Genus: Microcotyle
- Species: M. polymixiae

Binomial name
- Microcotyle polymixiae Yamaguti, 1968

Species of worms

Microcotyle polymixiae is a species of monogenean, parasitic on the gills of a marine fish. It belongs to the family Microcotylidae. It was first described and illustrated based on 82 whole mounts, from the gills of the silver eye, Polymixia japonica (Polymixiidae) off Hawaii.

== Description ==
Microcotyle polymixiae has the general morphology of all species of Microcotyle, with a flat lanceolate body, tapered anteriorly 3.5-8.5 mm in length, comprising an anterior part which contains most organs and a posterior part called the haptor. The haptor is symmetrical, hatchetshaped in profile and bears 57-88 clamps, arranged as two rows, one on each side(26-47 on the right and 27-47 on the left). The clamps of the haptor attach the animal to the gill of the fish. There are also two small buccal suckers strongly muscular, septate, unarmed and located at the anterior extremity. The digestive organs include an anterior, terminal mouth, a simple esophagus, a muscular rounded pharynx, and a posterior intestine with two lateral blind-ending branches terminating separately at the posterior end of the body proper. Each adult contains male and female reproductive organs. The reproductive organs include an anterior circular genital atrium opening a little in front of intestinal bifurcation., with spines, a dorsal vagina unarmed, opening middorsally just in front of body constriction, a single ovary, and 15 to 75 oval testes occupying the entire postovarian interintestinal field. The eggs are fusiforme with an anterior filament that is extremely fine, and convoluted; and a posterior filament that is short, and usually curved.

== Etymology ==
The specific epithet polymixiae is probably after the genus of the host fish, Polymixia, but this is not explicated in the text of the original description by Yamaguti.

== Hosts and localities ==
The type-host is the Silver eye, Polymixia japonica (Polymixiidae). The type-locality is off Hawaii. No other mention of this parasite seems to exist in the scientific literature. Yamaguti described two other species of Microcotyle from Hawai: Microcotyle bothi and Microcotyle emmelichthyops, from different host-fish.
