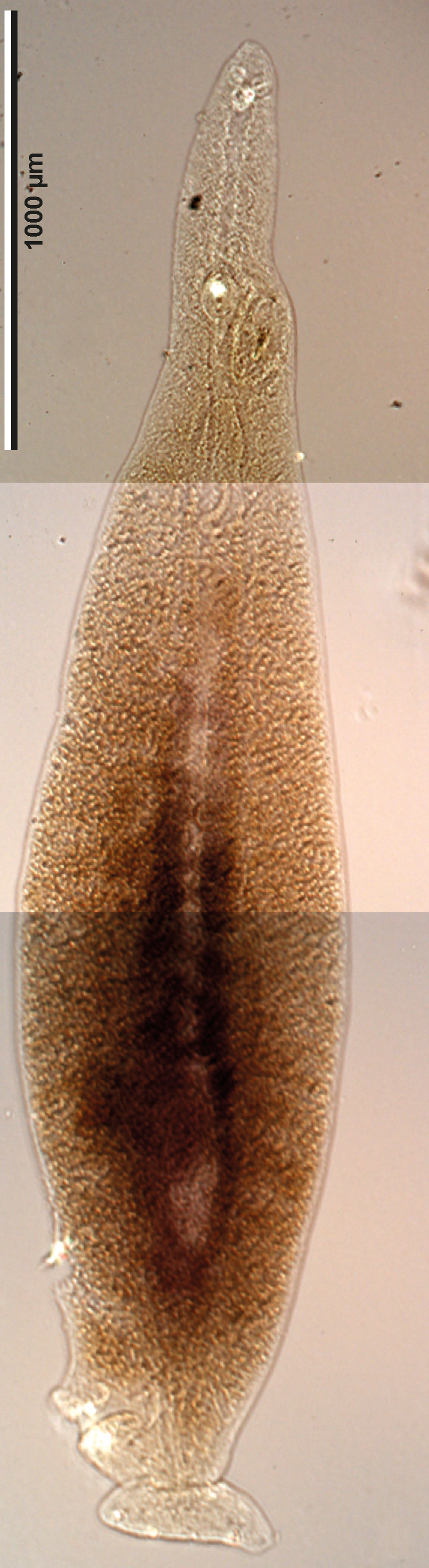
- Holotype of Lethacotyle fijiensis Manter & Prince, 1953

Scientific classification
- Kingdom: Animalia
- Phylum: Platyhelminthes
- Class: Monogenea
- Order: Mazocraeidea
- Family: Protomicrocotylidae
- Genus: Lethacotyle
- Species: L. fijiensis

Binomial name
- Lethacotyle fijiensis Manter & Price, 1953

= Lethacotyle fijiensis =

Species of flatworm

Lethacotyle fijiensis is a species of monogeneans of the family Protomicrocotylidae.

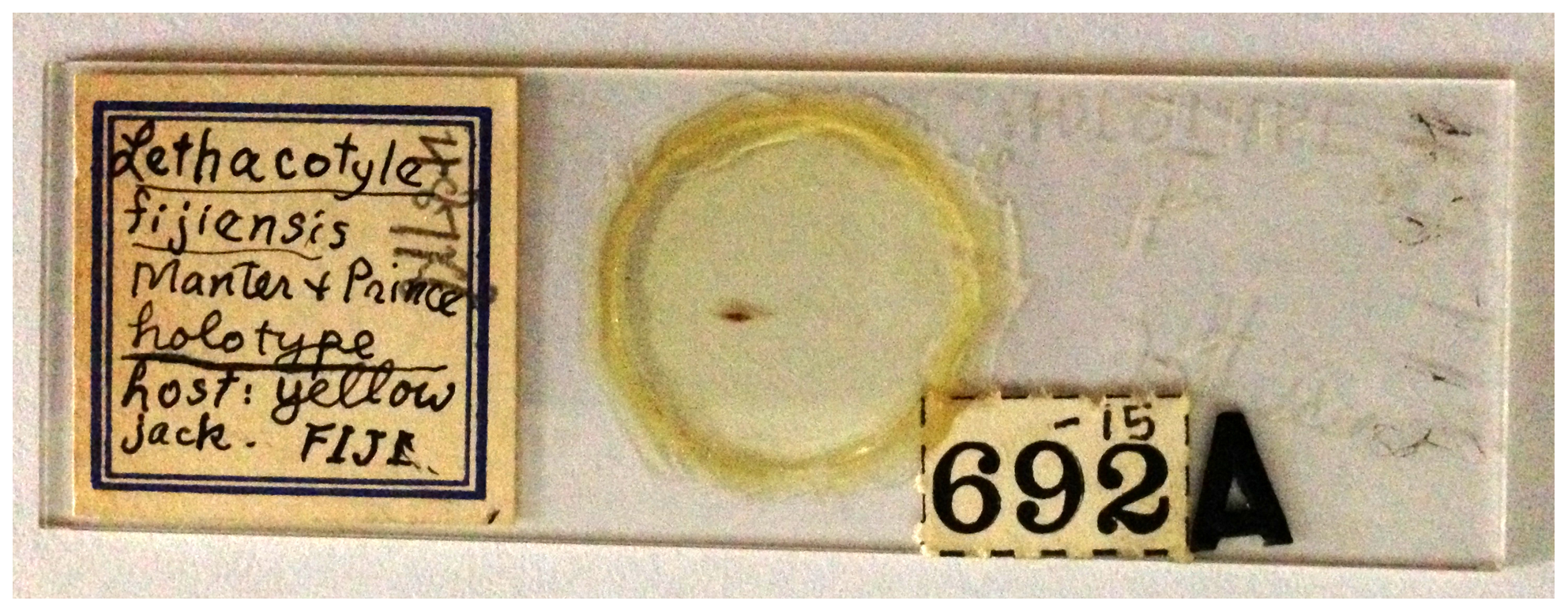
Microscopic slide of the holotype of Lethacotyle fijiensis, made in 1953

The species is ectoparasitic on the gills of an unknown carangid fish identified in the original publication as "yellow jack". It is the type-species of the genus Lethacotyle Manter & Prince, 1953. It has been described from two specimens only by Manter & Prince in 1953; of these, a single specimen, the holotype has been kept in the US National Parasite Collections and thus was the single specimen of the species, and therefore of the genus, which was available for study. Later, another species of the same genus was described.

Lethacotyle fijiensis has been found only off Fiji by Manter & Prince in 1953 (the material of the original description, hence the Latin species name, fijiensis, meaning "from Fiji") and allegedly off Andaman Islands by Ramalingam in 1968, although other authors have expressed doubt that the later author actually found the same species.

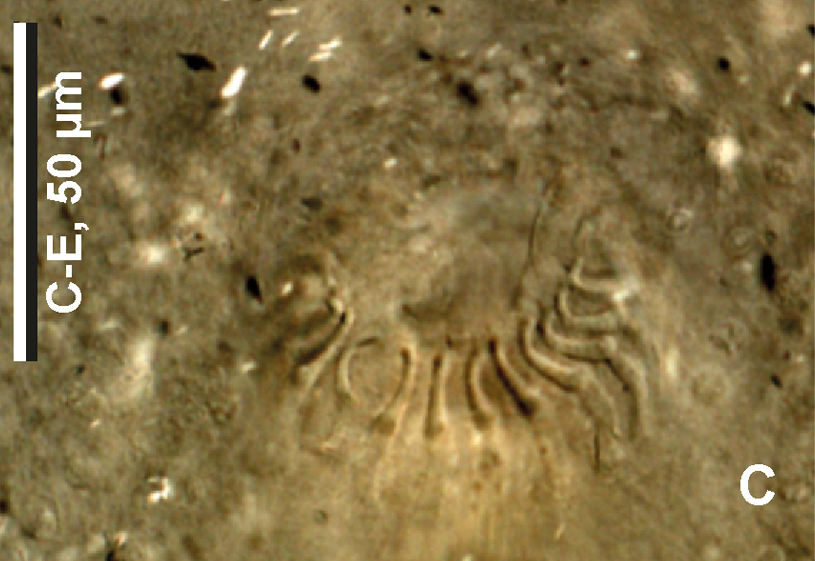
Male copulatory organ of Lethacotyle fijiensis

The two specimens of the original material of L. fijiensis are 3.156 and 3.759 millimetres in length. The body is elongate, flat, there are numerous testes and a single ovary. The copulatory organs include a sclerotised vagina and male copulatory organ, comprising a ring of 24-25 spines which are 24 μm in length. The length of the spines of the male copulatory apparatus is the main diagnosis character of the species, which allows its separation from L. vera, the only other species of the genus.

The posterior part of the body of L. fijiensis is asymmetrical. It bears a terminal lappet which is striated, and there are no clamps – this is a characteristic of the genus Lethacotyle.
