= Microcotyle bothi =

Scientific classification
- Kingdom: Animalia
- Phylum: Platyhelminthes
- Class: Monogenea
- Order: Mazocraeidea
- Family: Microcotylidae
- Genus: Microcotyle
- Species: M. bothi

Binomial name
- Microcotyle bothi Yamaguti, 1968

Species of worms

Microcotyle bothi is a species of monogenean, parasitic on the gills of a marine fish collected in Hawaii. It belongs to the family Microcotylidae.

== Description ==
Microcotyle bothi has the general morphology of all species of Microcotyle, with a flat body, 3.8-7.9 mm in length, comprising an anterior part which contains most organs and a posterior part called the haptor. The haptor is symmetrical and bears 45-65 clamps, arranged as two rows, one on each side. The clamps of the haptor attach the animal to the gill of the fish. There are also two small buccal suckers at the anterior extremity. The digestive organs include an anterior, terminal mouth, a muscular pharynx, and a posterior intestine with two lateral blind-ending branches. Each adult contains male and female reproductive organs. The reproductive organs include an anterior genital atrium, with spines, a dorsal vagina, a single ovary, and 18-48 testes which are posterior to the ovary.

Yamaguti considered that the species differed "from any of the known members of the genus Microcotyle in the combined character of the number of clamps and the number of testes".

== Hosts and localities ==
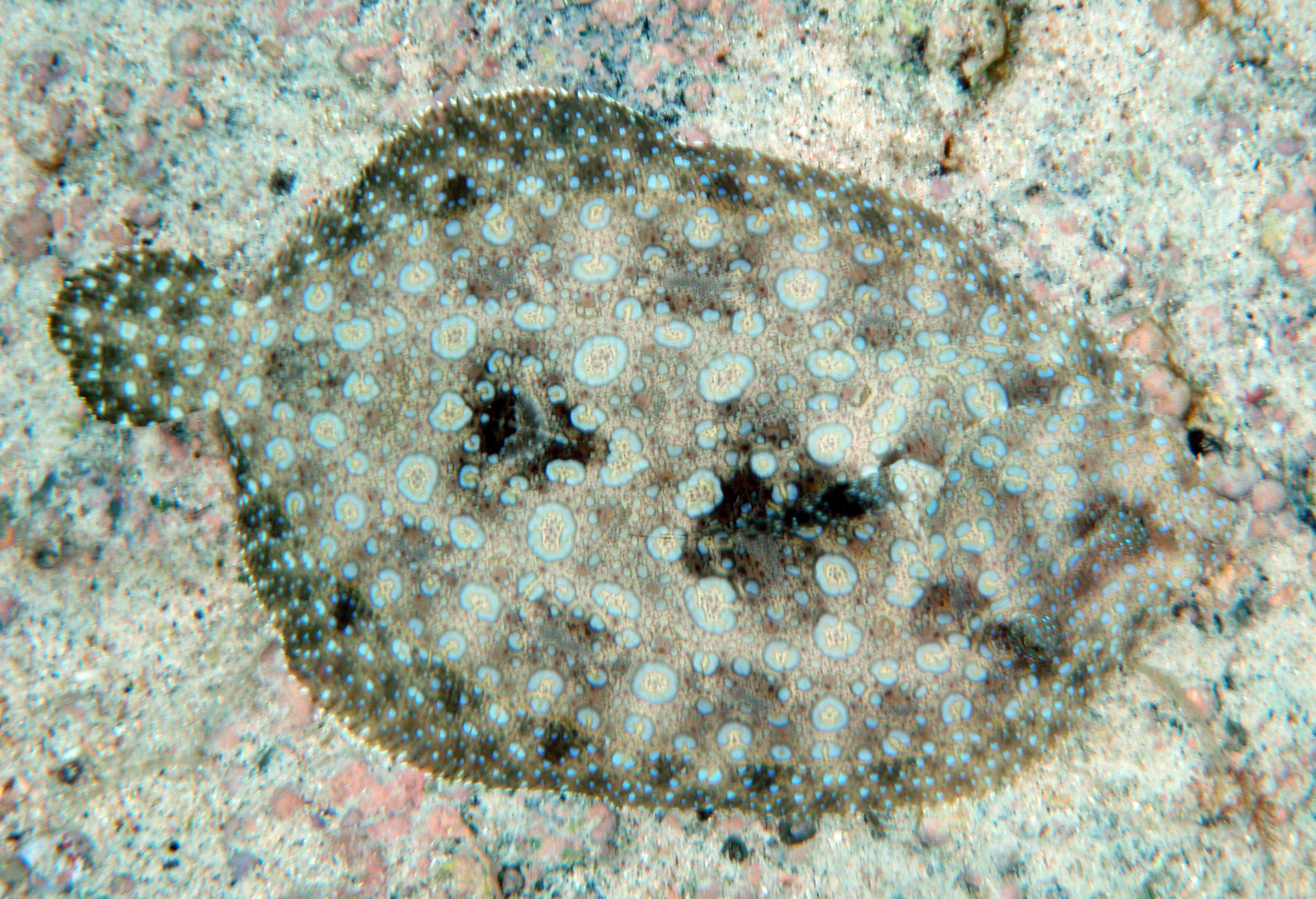
The flowery flounder Bothus mancus is the type-host of Microcotyle bothi

The type-host is the flowery flounder Bothus mancus. The type-locality is off Hawaii. Yamaguti described two other species of Microcotyle from Hawai: Microcotyle polymixiae and Microcotyle emmelichthyops, from different host-fish.
