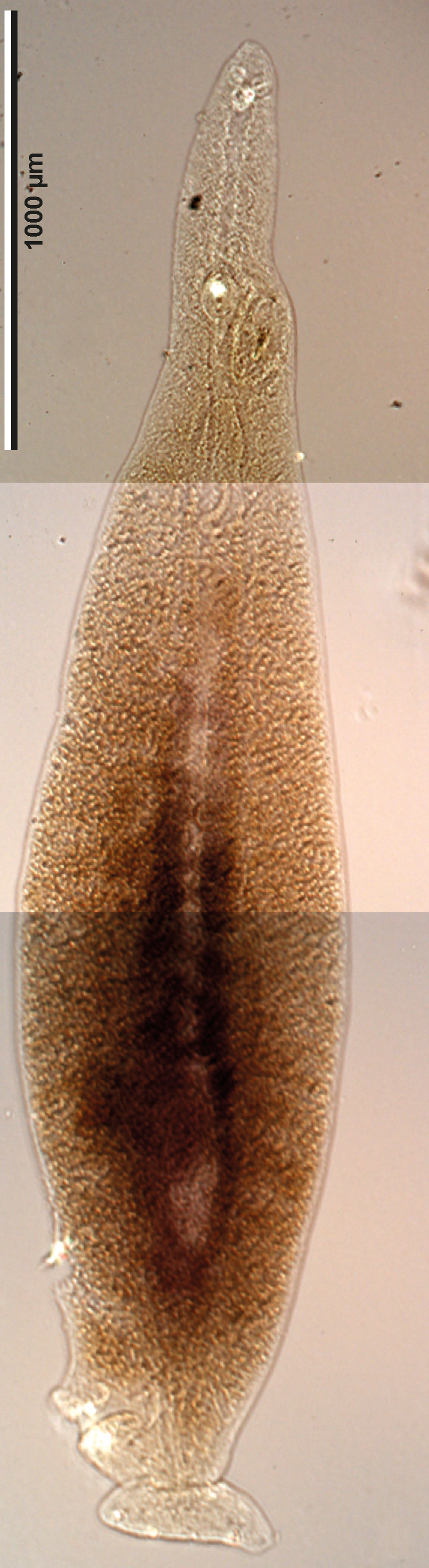
- Holotype of Lethacotyle fijiensis Manter & Prince, 1953

Scientific classification
- Kingdom: Animalia
- Phylum: Platyhelminthes
- Class: Monogenea
- Order: Mazocraeidea
- Family: Protomicrocotylidae
- Genus: Lethacotyle; Manter & Price, 1953

Species
- Lethacotyle fijiensis; Lethacotyle vera

= Lethacotyle =

Genus of flatworms

Lethacotyle is a genus of polyopisthocotylean monogeneans, included in the family Protomicrocotylidae.
The genus includes only two species: Lethacotyle fijiensis Manter & Price, 1953 , the type-species of the genus, and Lethacotyle vera Justine, Rahmouni, Gey, Schoelinck, & Hoberg, 2013 . Both species are parasitic on the gills of jacks in the Pacific Ocean. They are known only from three localities: off Fiji, Andaman Islands, and New Caledonia.
The genus Lethacotyle is special in that its members have no clamps on their posterior attachment organ or haptor, in contrast to most polyopisthocotylean Monogenean which have clamps. This is reflected in the etymology of the name, which, according to Manter & Price is "from letha = forgetting, and cotyle = cup, and refers to the absence of clamps".
