= Microcotyle emmelichthyops =

Scientific classification
- Kingdom: Animalia
- Phylum: Platyhelminthes
- Class: Monogenea
- Order: Mazocraeidea
- Family: Microcotylidae
- Genus: Microcotyle
- Species: M. emmelichthyops

Binomial name
- Microcotyle emmelichthyops Yamaguti, 1968

Species of worms

Microcotyle emmelichthyops is a species of monogenean, parasitic on the gills of a marine fish in Hawaii. It belongs to the family Microcotylidae.

== Description ==
The species was described from 23 specimens. Microcotyle emmelichthyops has the general morphology of all species of Microcotyle, with a flat body, 2.3-11 mm in length, comprising an anterior part which contains most organs and a posterior part called the haptor. The haptor is symmetrical and bears 62-115 clamps, arranged as two rows, one on each side. The clamps of the haptor attach the animal to the gill of the fish. There are also two small buccal suckers at the anterior extremity. The digestive organs include an anterior, terminal mouth, a muscular pharynx, and a posterior intestine with two lateral blind-ending branches. Each adult contains male and female reproductive organs. The reproductive organs include an anterior genital atrium, with spines, a dorsal vagina, a single ovary, and 20-46 testes which are posterior to the ovary.

Yamaguti considered that the species "differed from the most closely related Microcotyle cepolae Yamaguti, 1937 in the genital atrium consisting of a larger anterior and a smaller posterior chamber and in the number of testes (20-46 vs 15-20)".

== Hosts and localities ==
The type-host is an unidentified fish of the genus Emmelichthyops. The type-locality is off Hawaii. Yamaguti described two other species of Microcotyle from Hawai: Microcotyle polymixiae and Microcotyle bothi, from different host-fish.
