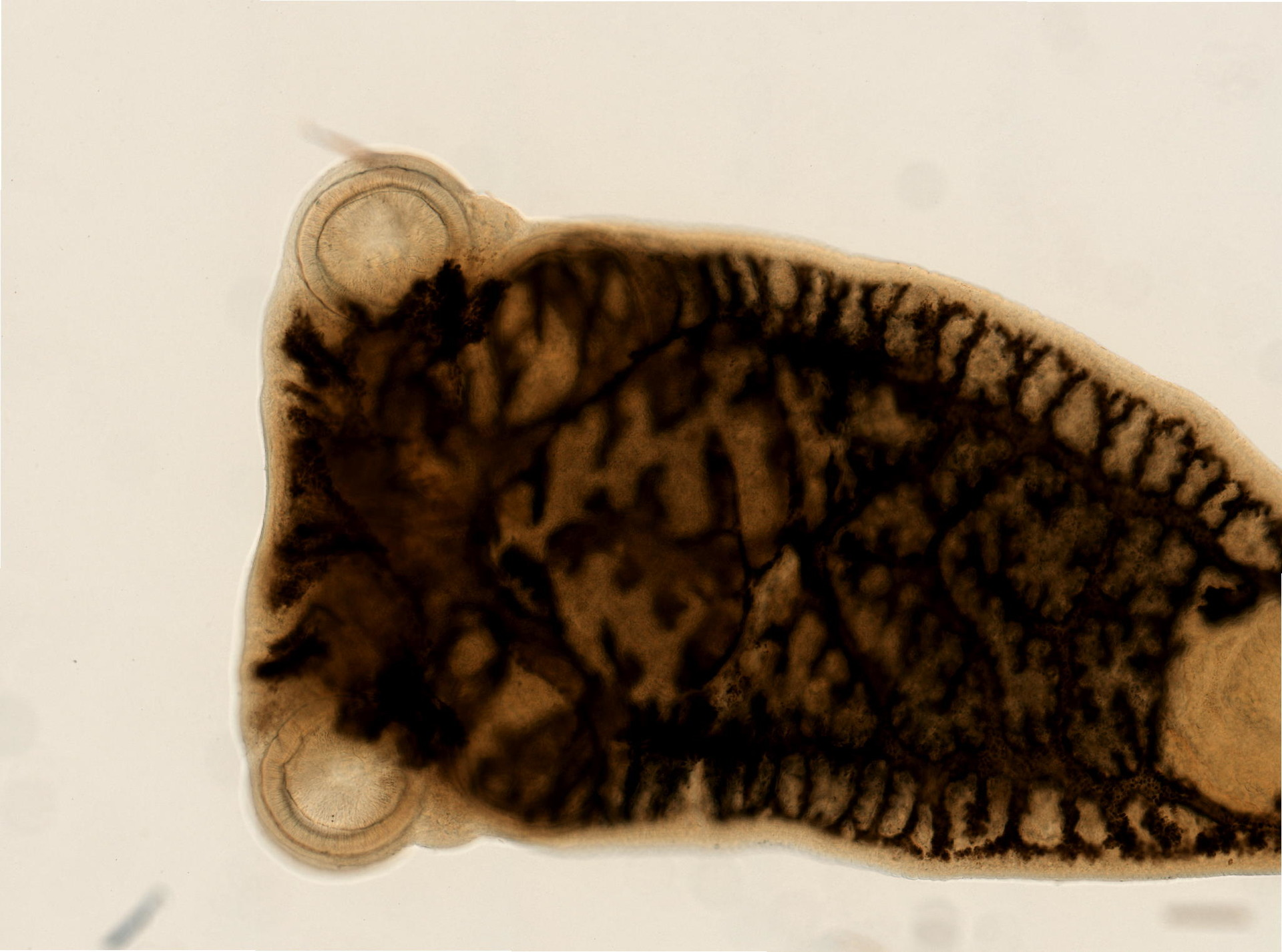

Scientific classification
- Kingdom: Animalia
- Phylum: Platyhelminthes
- Class: Monogenea
- Order: Polystomatidea
- Family: Polystomatidae
- Genus: Polystoma
- Species: P. integerrimum

Binomial name
- Polystoma integerrimum (Frölich, 1791)

= Polystoma integerrimum =

Species of flatworm

Polystoma integerrimum is a flatworm (platyhelminth) from the class Monogenea found in amphibians in Asia and Europe. It is an endoparasite of frogs and toads and has an unusual life cycle which synchronises with that of its host.

== Description ==
P. integerrimum is a leaf-like flatworm that can grow to a maximum length of about 3 cm (1.2 in). At the anterior (head) end are the mouth and a pair of suckers, and at the posterior end is the main device by which the parasite attaches to its host, the opisthaptor, with its three pairs of suckers, a pair of hooked anchors and marginal hooks. The flatworm's mouth is connected to a muscular pharynx, an oesophagus and a gut, but it has no anus.

== Ecology ==
P. integerrimum inhabits the bladder of a frog or toad where it feeds on blood, mucus and the sloughed cells of its host. Unlike many species of flatworm, the adults are either male or female, with functional testes or ovaries. The eggs are produced throughout the year but are stored in the host's bladder and only pass out into the water when the amphibian returns there to breed; in this way, the flatworms synchronise their reproductive cycle with that of their amphibian hosts. After hatching, the flatworm larvae, called oncomiracidia, make their way to the gills of developing tadpoles, where they attach. Here they stay until the tadpoles undergo metamorphosis, at which time they crawl over their hosts' bodies and enter their bladders through their cloacas.

Some of the flatworm larvae develop in a different way, particularly when developing on younger tadpoles, becoming prematurely sexually mature while still attached to the gills of the tadpole. These neotenic individuals are capable of producing viable eggs which pass out into the water and develop in the normal way.
