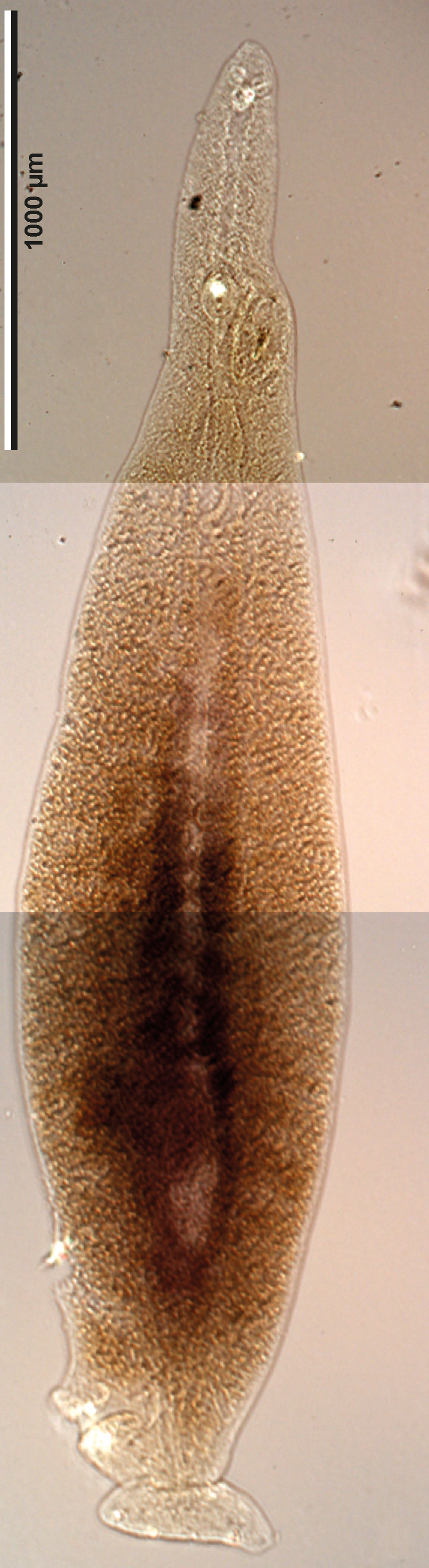
- Lethacotyle fijiensis

Scientific classification
- Kingdom: Animalia
- Phylum: Platyhelminthes
- Class: Monogenea
- Order: Mazocraeidea
- Family: Protomicrocotylidae; Johnston & Tiegs, 1922

Genera
- See text

= Protomicrocotylidae =

Family of flatworms

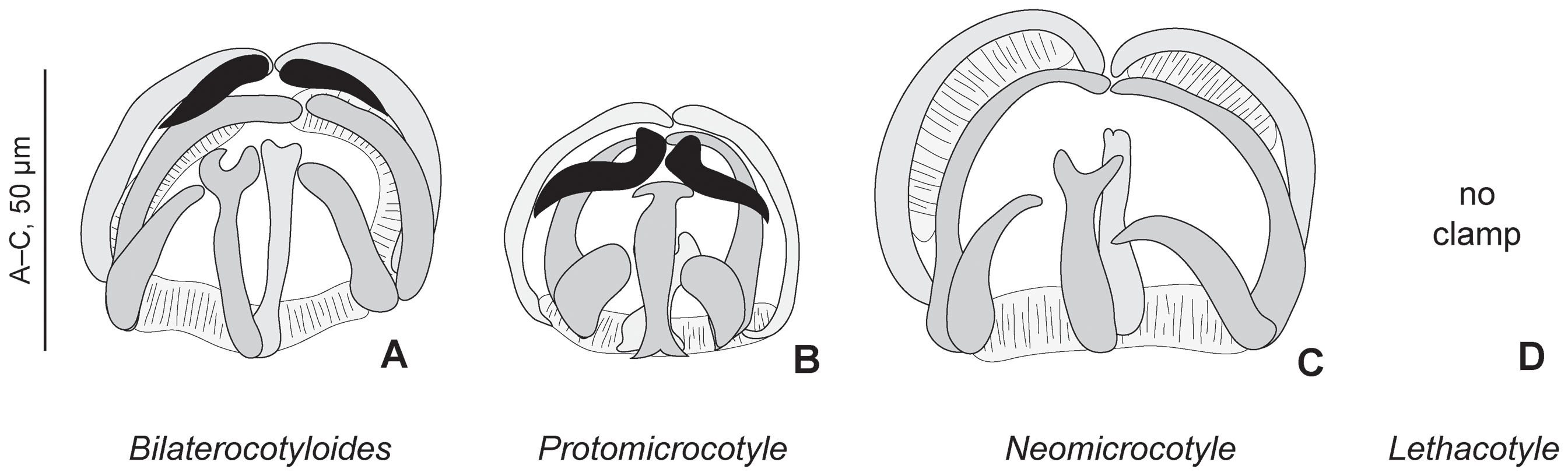
Clamps in various genera of Protomicrocotylidae: accessory sclerites (black) are present in Bilaterocotyloides and Protomicrocotyle, and absent in Neomicrocotyle. Clamps are absent in Lethacotyle.

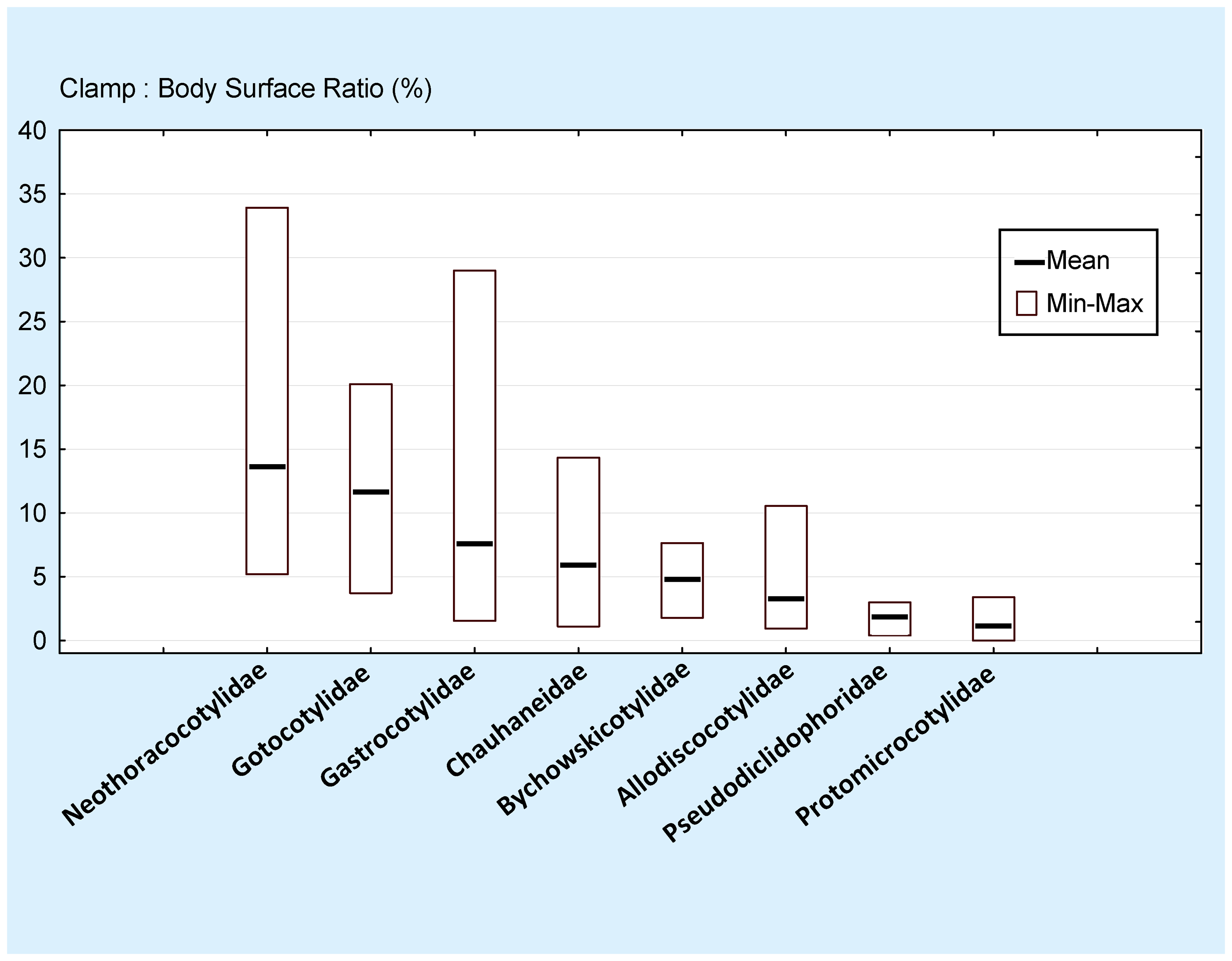
Ratio between clamp surface and body surface in eight families of gastrocotylinean monogeneans: the lowest ratio is in the protomicrocotylids

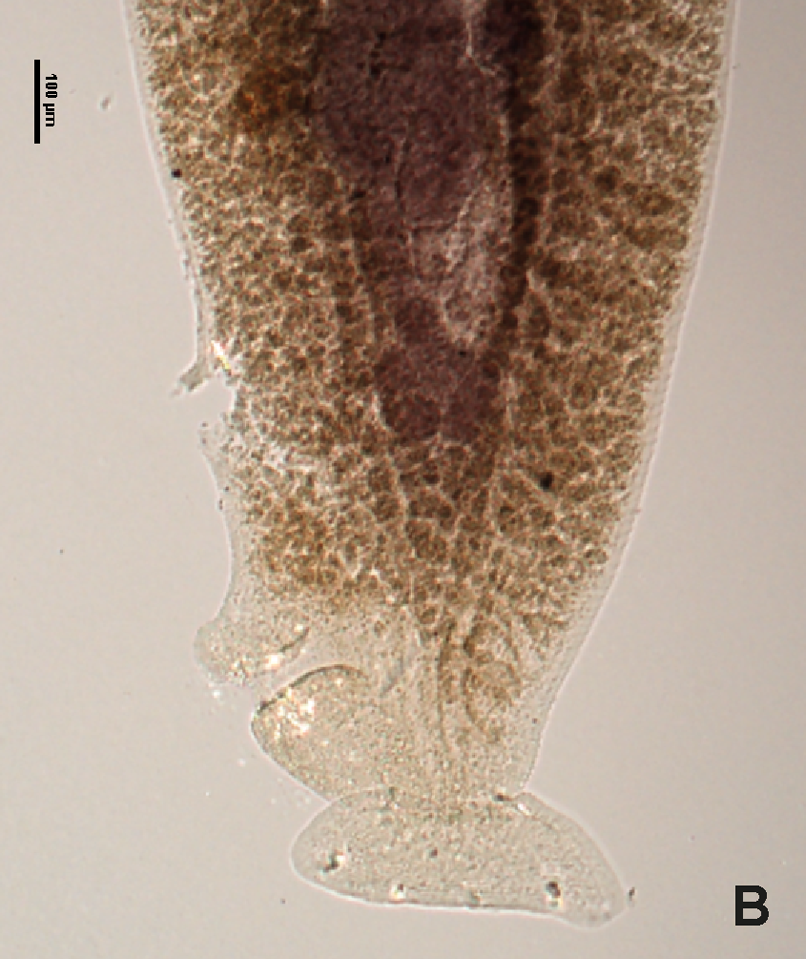
Posterior part of a protomicrocotylid, showing bilateral asymmetry

Protomicrocotylidae is a family of monogenean parasites in the order Mazocraeidea.

The type-genus of the family is Protomicrocotyle. The genus was created in 1922 by Thomas Harvey Johnston and Oscar Werner Tiegs for a worm previously described under the name Acanthodiscus mirabile by MacCallum in 1918. The worm was parasitic on a crevalle jack of the New York Aquarium. Johnston & Tiegs originally proposed to create the subfamily Protomicrocotylinae, which was later raised to family level.

Members of this family are elongate, flat, and long of 1 to several millimetres. The reproductive system includes many testes, located in the anterior region of the body between the ceca, and a single posterior ovary. The male copulatory organ usually has spines. The posterior attachment organ or haptor, which attaches the worm to the host, is asymmetrical and has three pairs of small hooks.

As most other polyopisthocotyleans, members of the family Protomicrocotylidae have posterior clamps on their haptor. These clamps are of the gastrocotylid type, i.e. they include two accessory sclerites in addition to the other sclerites, but in some genera the clamps are simplified as microcotylid type, i.e. they have only five sclerites, and are even absent in members of the genus Lethacotyle.

Justine et al. observed that protomicrocotylids had specialized structures associated with their attachment organ, such as lateral flaps and transverse striations, which were not known in other monogeneans. They hypothesized that the clamps in protomicrocotylids were sequentially lost during evolution, coinciding with the development of other attachment structures. To test the hypothesis, they calculated the surfaces of clamps and body in 120 species of gastrocotylinean monogeneans. The ratio of clamp surface: body surface was the lowest in protomicrocotylids. They concluded that clamps in protomicrocotylids were vestigial organs, and that occurrence of gastrocotylid and simpler microcotylid clamps within the same family were steps in an evolutionary sequence, leading to the absence of these attributes in species of Lethacotyle.

Protomicrocotylids are all parasitic on gills of teleost fish, of only two families, the Carangidae (jacks) and Sphyraenidae (barracudas).
MacCallum (1918) found many worms on the gills of a crevalle jack and noted that he had "no doubt that at times the species may be a serious menace to the life of the fish".

== Genera ==
According to the World Register of Marine Species

- Bilaterocotyle Chauhan, 1945
- Bilaterocotyloides Ramalingam, 1961
- Chauhanocotyle Khoche & Dad, 1975
- Lethacotyle Manter & Price, 1953
- Neomicrocotyle Ramalingam, 1960
- Protomicrocotyle Johnston & Tiegs, 1922
- Vallisiopsis Subhapradha, 1951
- Youngiopsis Lebedev, 1972
