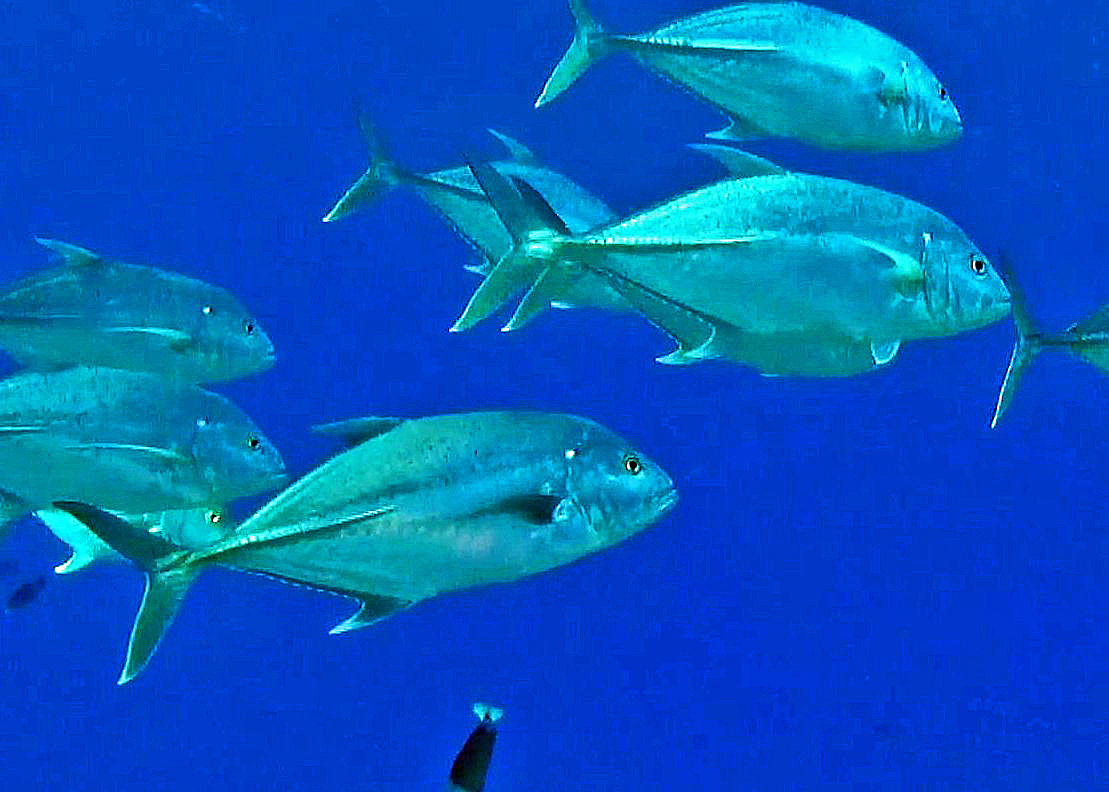
- Caranx papuensis from French Polynesia

Conservation status
- Least Concern (IUCN 3.1)

Scientific classification
- Kingdom: Animalia
- Phylum: Chordata
- Class: Actinopterygii
- Order: Carangiformes
- Suborder: Carangoidei
- Family: Carangidae
- Genus: Caranx
- Species: C. papuensis

Binomial name
- Caranx papuensis Alleyne & W. J. Macleay, 1877
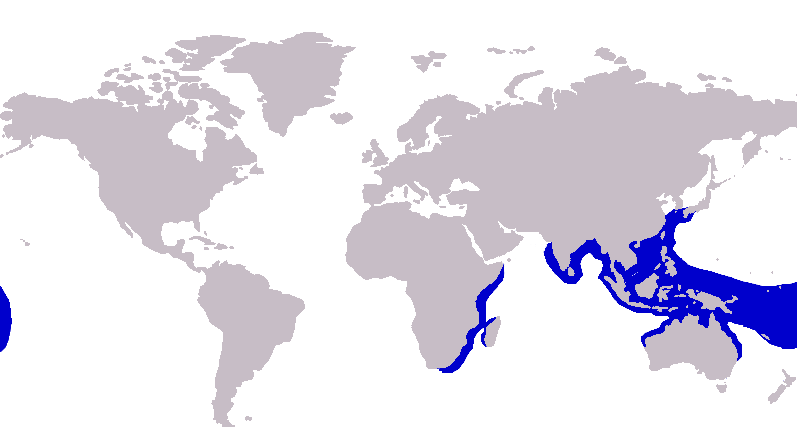
- Approximate range of the brassy trevally

Synonyms
- Caranx regularis Garman, 1903; Caranx celetus Smith, 1968

= Brassy trevally =

Species of fish

The brassy trevally, Caranx papuensis (also known as the brassy kingfish, Papuan trevally, tea-leaf trevally, and green back trevally) is a species of large marine fish classified in the jack family, Carangidae.

== Taxonomy and naming ==
The brassy trevally is classified within the genus Caranx, one of a number of groups known as the jacks or trevallies. Caranx itself is part of the larger jack and horse mackerel family Carangidae, which in turn is part of the order Carangiformes.

The species was first scientifically described by the Australian zoologists Haynes Gibbes Alleyne and William John Macleay in 1877 based on a specimen collected from Hall Sound off Papua New Guinea, which was designated to be the holotype. They named the species Caranx papuensis, with the specific epithet taking its name from Papua New Guinea where the holotype was taken. They referred the species to the genus Caranx, where it has remained. The species was independently redescribed twice; the first by Samuel Garman, who applied the name Caranx regularis and then by J. L. B. Smith with the name Caranx celetus. The species was apparently widely confused with the now dubious Caranx sansun, a move which resulted in Smith trying to resolve the taxon by renaming the species that had been identified as C. sansun, which led to several now defunct junior synonyms.

The species is commonly referred to as the brassy trevally, tea-leaf trevally, or greenback trevally in reference to its colouration, while Papuan trevally is used in reference to the specific epithet.

== Description ==
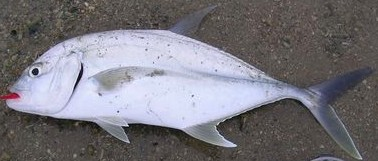
Caranx papuensis

The brassy trevally is a large species of fish, growing to a known maximum of 88 cm in length and 6.4 kg in weight. As its name suggests, the brassy trevally is a brassy to yellow greenish colour dorsally, becoming silvery white on the underside. Juveniles generally lack the brassy tinge, being silver all over. The species' head and body above the lateral line is scattered with small black spots, with few spots occasionally much lower near the pectoral fins. These spots become more numerous with age. The species also has a conspicuous pale silvery-white spot with black margins shoulder near the upper opercle. The fins are yellow to dusky with the exception of the caudal fin, which has a dusky upper lobe and a dusky to yellow lower lobe and distinctive narrow white band on the trailing edge. It is often confused with the giant trevally, Caranx ignobilis, but is best distinguished by its lighter dorsal colouring and abundant black spots.

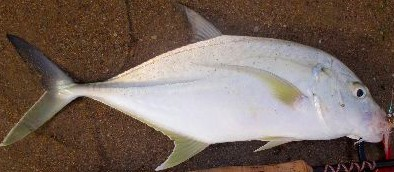
The dusky upper caudal fin lobe is a distinctive feature.

It is similar in general appearance to most jacks in the genus, having a compressed, oblong body, with the dorsal profile more convex than the ventral profile, particularly anteriorly. The dorsal fin is in two distinct parts; the first consisting of eight spines and the second of one spine and 21 to 23 soft rays. The anal fin consists of two anteriorly detached spines followed by one spine and 16 to 19 soft rays, while the pelvic fins have one spine followed by 19 to 20 soft rays. The lateral line is moderately arched anteriorly, with 53 to 61 scales in this section, while the straight section contains none to three scales and 31 to 39 strong scutes. The breast is naked ventrally with the exception of a small patch of scales before the pelvic fin. The species has weakly developed adipose eyelids, while its dentition consists of an outer row of widely spaced canines and an inner band of villiform teeth in the upper jaw with a row of widely spaced conical teeth on the lower jaw. The brassy trevally has 26 to 30 gill rakers and 24 vertebrae.

== Distribution ==
The brassy trevally is widespread throughout the tropical and subtropical waters of the Indian and West Pacific Oceans. Its range extends from South Africa and Madagascar north along the East African coast, but no records of the species are known from the Red Sea or Persian Gulf. Records resume from India eastward throughout Southeast Asia, the Indonesian Archipelago and numerous Indian Ocean and East Pacific island groups. The species is known from as far south as Sydney, Australia and as far north as the Ryukyu Islands of Japan. Its range extends eastward to the Marquesas Islands in the central Pacific.

== Habitat ==
The brassy trevally inhabits both inshore and offshore environments, predominantly inhabiting the seaward side of reef complexes or deepwater pinnacles as an adult. Other habitats the species is known from include rock outcrops in sandy bays and lagoons, while juveniles are often found in tidal mangrove-lined creeks in turbid waters. Juveniles are also found in estuaries throughout their range, occasionally extending to the upper reaches of rivers.

== Biology ==
The brassy trevally is a predatory fish, traveling either individually or in small schools, where it hunts down a variety of prey including small fish, squid, prawns, and crabs. Studies on the species in Natal estuaries found juveniles take predominantly crustaceans as prey, switching to teleosts as they mature. Other aspects of the species biology are poorly understood, including reproduction and movements, although catch data indicate higher numbers occur in South Africa in summer.

As other fish, the brassy trevally is the host of various parasites. Internal parasites include the bucephalid digenean Prosorhynchoides lamprelli in the intestine and external parasites include the protomicrocotylid monogenean Lethacotyle vera on the gills.

== Relationship with humans ==
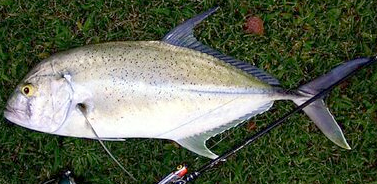
The brassy trevally is often taken by anglers.

The brassy trevally is not of high importance to commercial fisheries, often finding its way to market as bycatch in various netting and hook-and-line fisheries. Catch statistics are not kept for the species. The species is of some importance to recreational fishermen, and is considered a good gamefish and is often taken by various fish baits, as well as lures and flies. Despite this, it is rarely targeted by anglers, who overlook it for larger relatives such as giant trevally and bluefin trevally, with the species often being an incidental catch, and rarely kept. The species is also commonly taken by spearfishermen. Brassy trevally is considered to be an excellent table fish. The species has been held in large saltwater aquaria, with studies at the Reunion Island Aquarium reporting the species adjusts to aquarium life, but needs a large tank. The IGFA all tackle world record for the species stands at 7.90 kg (17 lb 7 oz) caught off of Bazaruto Island, Mozambique in 2008.
