= Sclerite =

Hardened body part

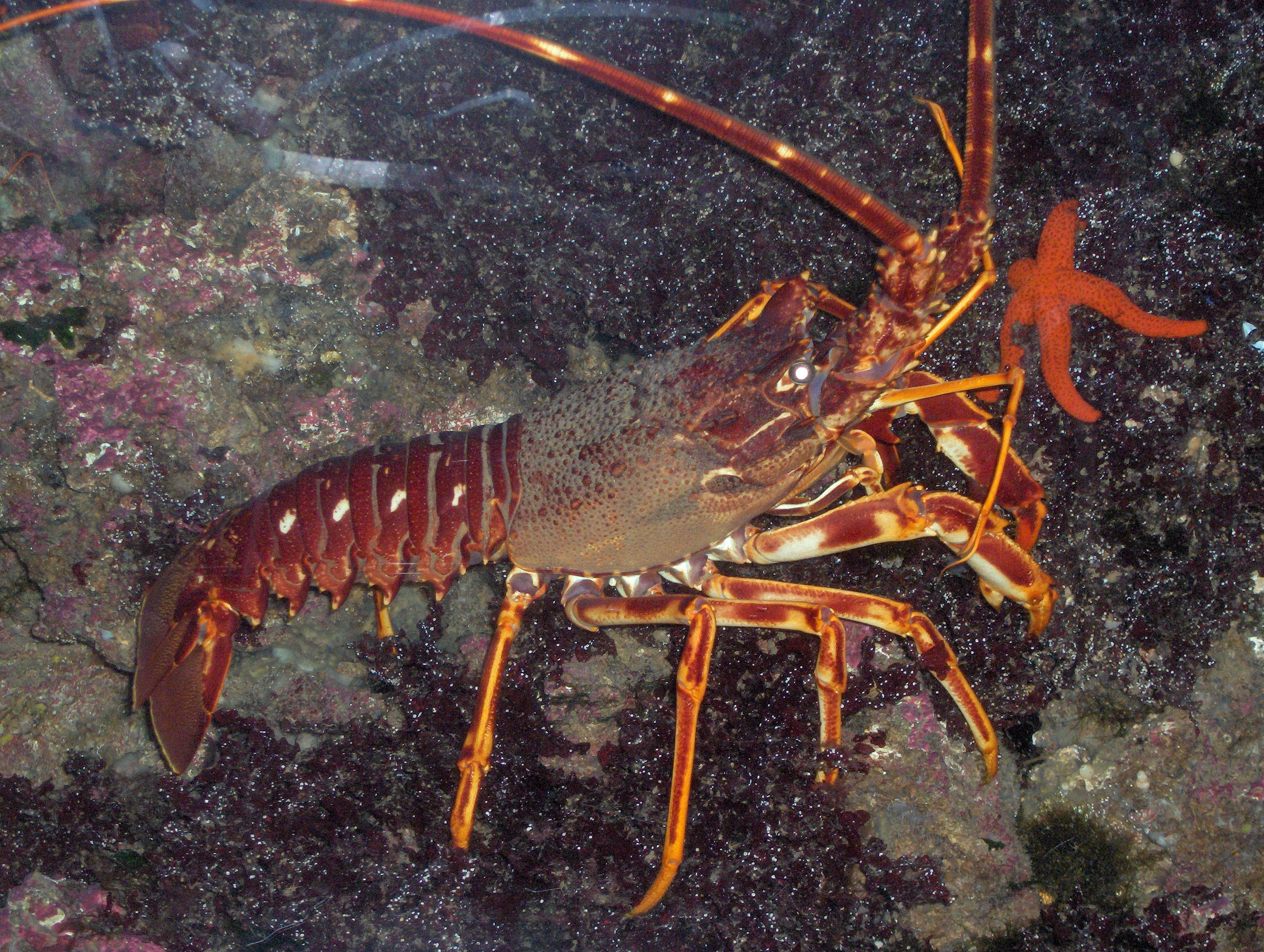
The exoskeleton of a spiny lobster is made of a series of sclerites, connected by flexible joints.

A sclerite (Greek σκληρός, sklēros, meaning "hard") is a hardened body part. In various branches of biology the term is applied to various structures, but not as a rule to vertebrate anatomical features such as bones and teeth. Instead it refers most commonly to the hardened parts of arthropod exoskeletons and the internal spicules of invertebrates such as certain sponges and soft corals. In paleontology, a scleritome is the complete set of sclerites of an organism, often all that is known from fossil invertebrates.

== Sclerites in combination ==
Sclerites may occur practically isolated in an organism, such as the sting of a cone shell. Also, they can be more or less scattered, such as tufts of defensive sharp, mineralised bristles as in many marine polychaetes. Or, they can occur as structured, but unconnected or loosely connected arrays, such as the mineral "teeth" in the radula of many Mollusca, the valves of chitons, the beak of a cephalopod, or the articulated exoskeletons of Arthropoda.

When sclerites are organised into an unarticulated structure, that structure may be referred to as a scleritome, a term largely used in paleontology.

== Arthropods ==
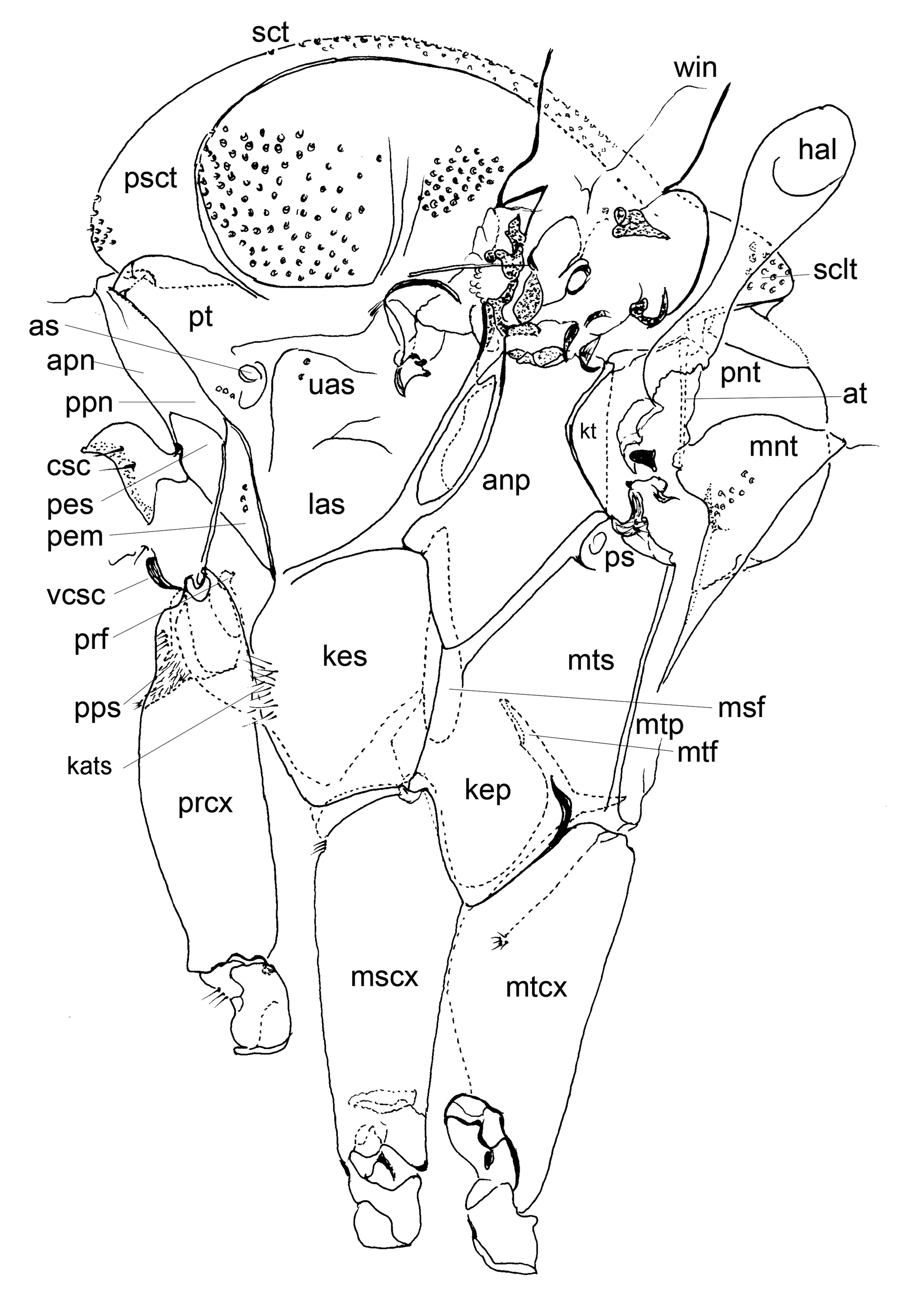
Sclerites of cervix and thorax of Phlebotominae

In Arthropoda, the hardening that produces sclerites is accomplished either by the cross-linking of protein chains in the exocuticle, a process called sclerotization, or by incorporation of minerals such as calcium carbonate into regions of the exoskeleton, or both. Thus, the arthropod exoskeleton is divided into numerous sclerites, joined by less-sclerotized, membranous regions or sutures.

Dorsal sclerites of a body segment, often plate-like, are known as tergites. Similarly the ventral sclerites of a body segment are referred to as sternites. Separate sclerites on the lateral aspects of body segments, the pleura, are called pleurites.

== Invertebrates other than arthropods ==
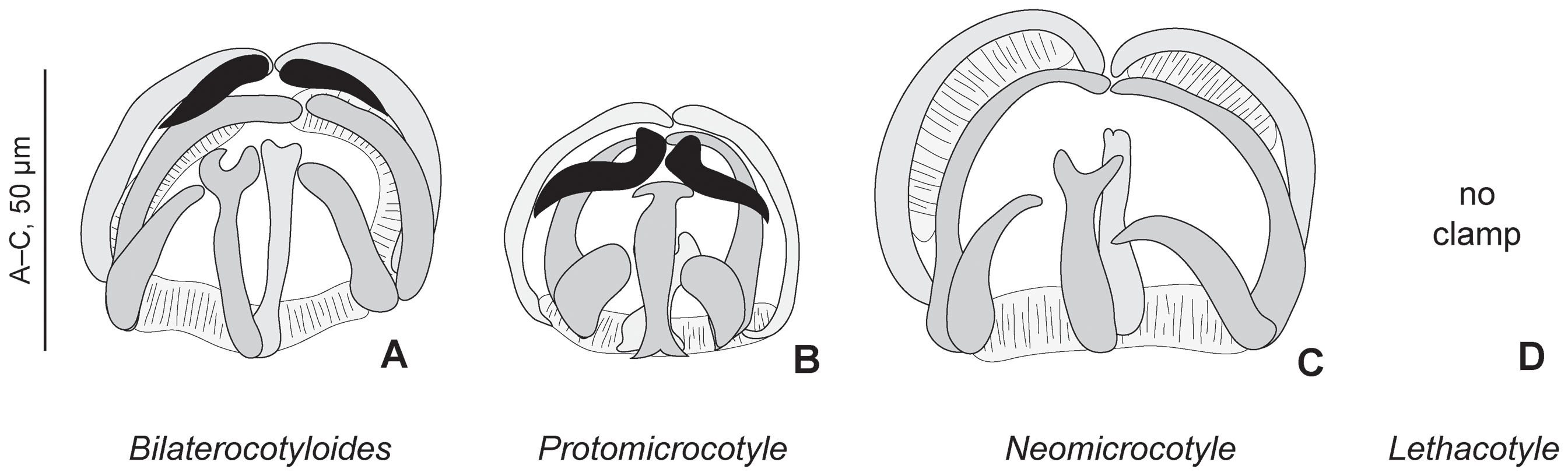
Sclerites in clamps in polyopisthocotylean monogeneans; various sclerites are in grey and black

Wide ranges of sclerites of various kinds occur in various invertebrate phyla, including Polychaeta and Mollusca. Two taxa that routinely have the term applied however, are the soft corals and the Porifera. In both those groups certain of their structures contain mineralised spicules of silica or calcium carbonate that are of importance structurally and in defense.

Many other invertebrates grow a few hard parts, largely mineralised, as statoliths and similar structures, but those are not generally referred to as sclerites.

Clamps, the main attachment structure of the parasitic polyopisthocotylean monogenean flatworms, are composed of various sclerites and associated musculature, located on a posterior organ called the haptor. Clamps are specialized structures attached to the host fish, generally to its gill.

== Prehistory ==
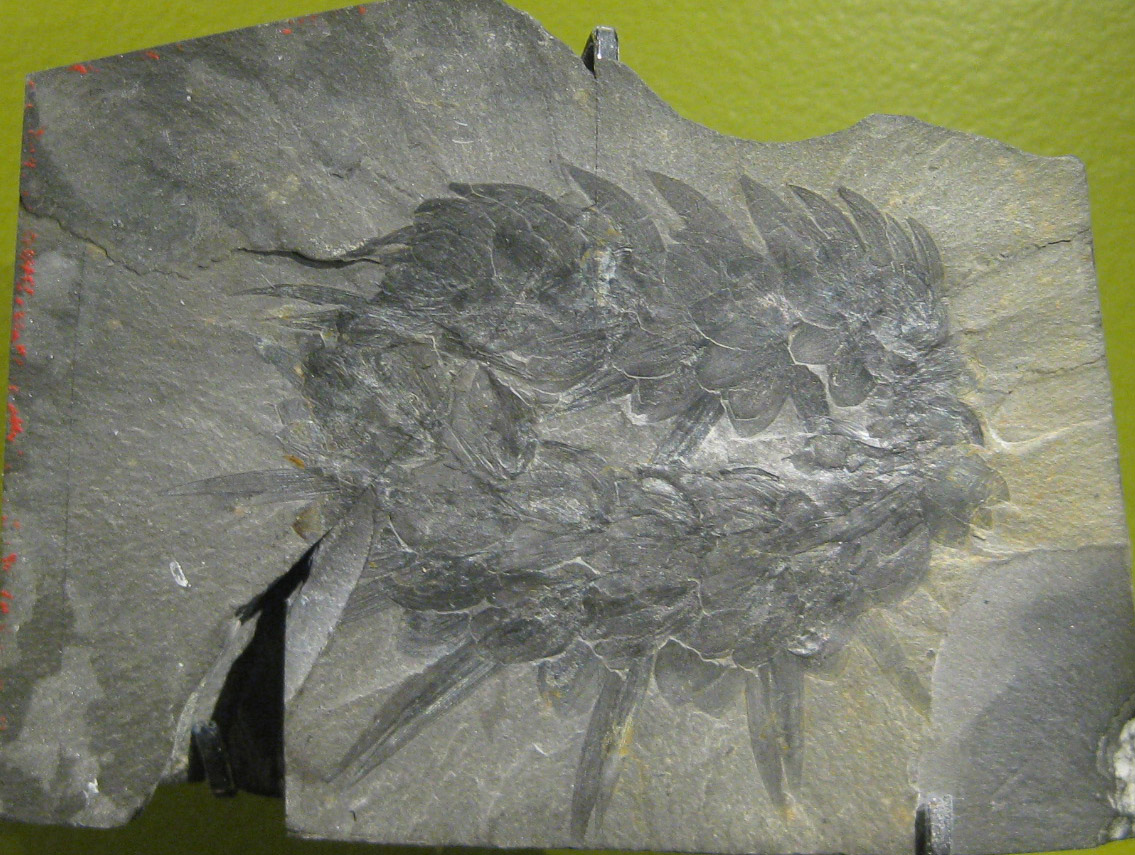
The fossilized scleritome of Wiwaxia corrugata

A scleritome is a skeleton made of isolated elements, like the scales of organisms such as the halwaxiids, the teeth in a radula, spicules in a sponge skeleton, or the elements in a conodont apparatus. The term was coined by the palaeontologist Stefan Bengtson.

Although sclerites are of considerable importance in the study of extant animals, in palaeontology they are of far greater relative importance because they often are the only parts of an animal that fossilize at all, let alone well or clearly. Many extinct groups are known only from sclerites, leaving moot the question of what their gross anatomy might have looked like.

An example of the use of the term in paleontology is to describe hollow calcium carbonate, calcium sulfate or calcium phosphate plates grown as body armor by a number of Early Cambrian animals. Unlike sponge spicules, Early Cambrian sclerites appear to be external armor rather than internal structural elements. Sclerites are found on a curious collection of early animals including a common spongelike animal called Chancelloria; an armored slug-like form Wiwaxia; an armored worm with a pair of brachiopod-like shells Halkieria; and another armored worm Microdictyon that is generally considered to be a lobopod/onychophore.

It has been suggested that the sclerites of the Cambrian Wiwaxia are homologous with the bristles of annelid worms. At least one modern gastropod mollusc living near deep sea hydrothermal vents has structures made of iron sulfides similar to some Cambrian sclerites.

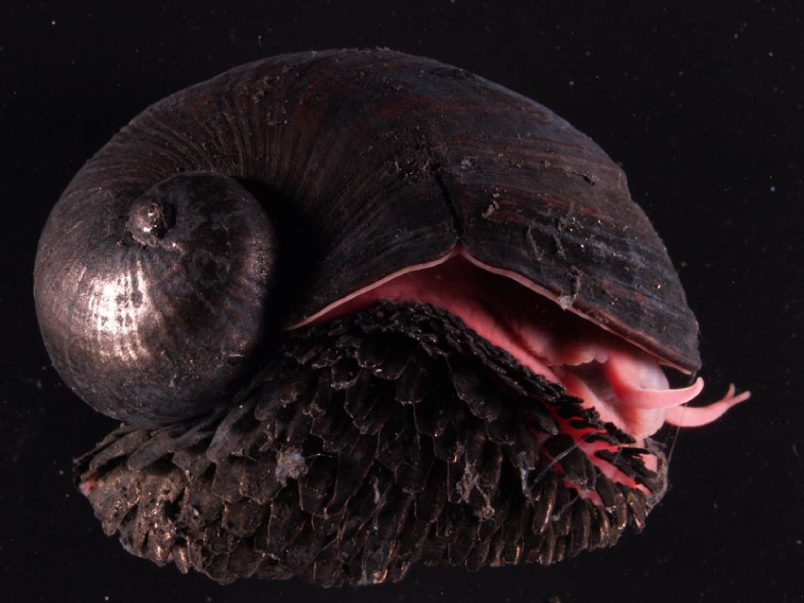
The scaly-foot gastropod is the only gastropod with sclerites.
