= Polystomatidae =

Scientific classification
- Kingdom: Animalia
- Phylum: Platyhelminthes
- Class: Monogenea
- Subclass: Polyopisthocotylea
- Order: Polystomatidea; Lebedev, 1988
- Family: Polystomatidae; Gamble, 1896

Family of flatworms

Polystomatidae is a family of flatworms belonging to the class Monogenea.

== Genera ==
Genera:

- Apaloneotrema Du Preez & Verneau, 2020
- Aussietrema Du Preez & Verneau, 2020
- Concinnocotyla Pichelin, Whittington & Pearson, 1991
