= Polyopisthocotylea =

- Silhouettes of bodies of various polyopisthocotylean monogeneans

Scientific classification
- Domain: Eukaryota
- Kingdom: Animalia
- Phylum: Platyhelminthes
- Class: Monogenea
- Subclass: Polyopisthocotylea

Orders
- See text

Subclass of parasitic flatworms in the class Monogenea

Polyopisthocotylea is a subclass of parasitic flatworms in the class Monogenea.

== Classification ==
There are only two subclasses in the class Monogenea:

- Monopisthocotylea. The name means "a single posterior sucker" - the attachment organ (the haptor) is simple.
- Polyopisthocotylea. The name means "several posterior suckers" - the attachment organ (the haptor) is complex, with several clamps or suckers.

The subclass Polyopisthocotylea contains the four following orders:

- Order Chimaericolidea
- Order Diclybothriidea
- Order Lagarocotylidea
- Order Mazocraeidea
- Order Polystomatidea

== Examples of species ==
- Microcotyle visa, one of the numerous species which are parasitic on gills of marine fish.
- Diplozoon paradoxum, famous for its perfect monogamy, with the two individuals of the pair fused together
- Lethacotyle vera, a parasite of the brassy trevally (Caranx papuensis), "the monogenean which lost its clamps"
- Polystoma integerrimum, a parasite of frogs which synchronises its breeding with that of its host
- Protocotyle euzetmaillardi, a parasite of the bigeyed sixgill shark Hexanchus nakamurai
- Chimaericola leptogaster, a parasite of the gills of the chimaera Chimaera monstrosa.
