= Clamp (zoology) =

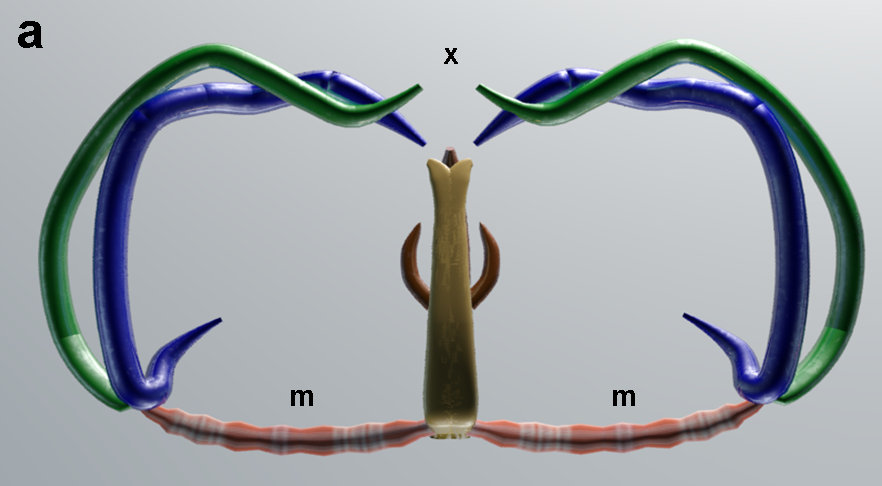
Computer model of the sclerites in the clamp of a microcotylid monogenean

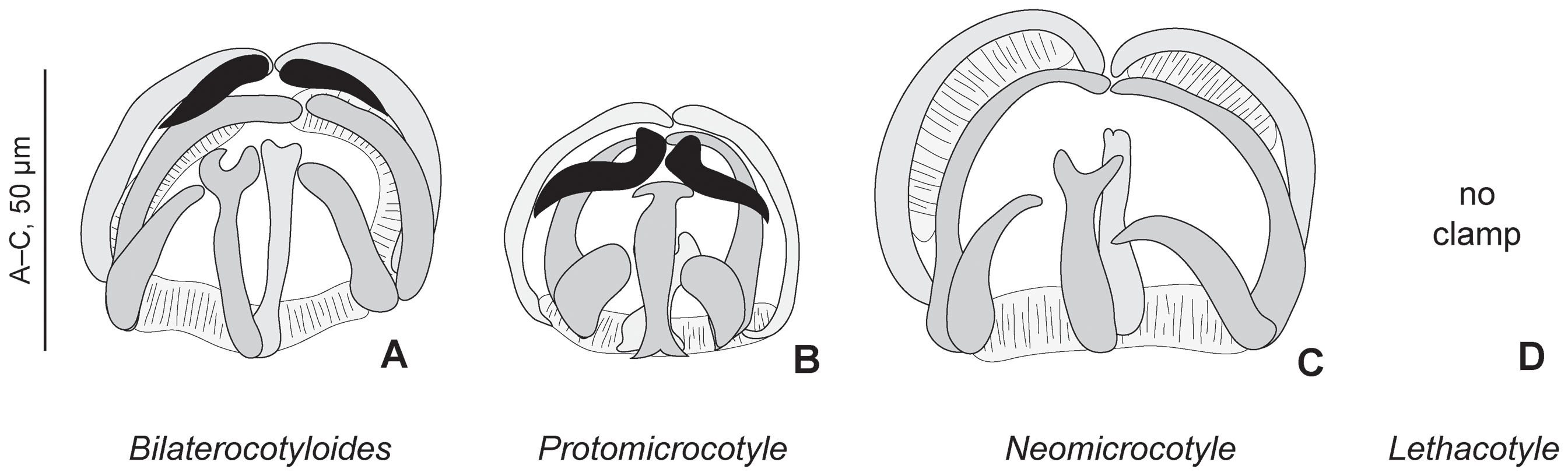
Clamps in various Polyopisthocotylean monogeneans of family Protomicrocotylidae

Clamps are the main attachment structure of the Polyopisthocotylean monogeneans.
These ectoparasitic worms have a variable number of clamps on their haptor (the posterior attachment organ); each clamp is attached to the host fish, generally to its gill. Clamps include sclerotised elements, called the sclerites, and muscles. The structure of clamps varies according to the groups within the Polyopisthocotylean monogeneans; microcotylids have relatively simple clamps, whereas gastrocotylids have more complex clamps.
