= Haptor =

Attachment organ of monogenean flatworms

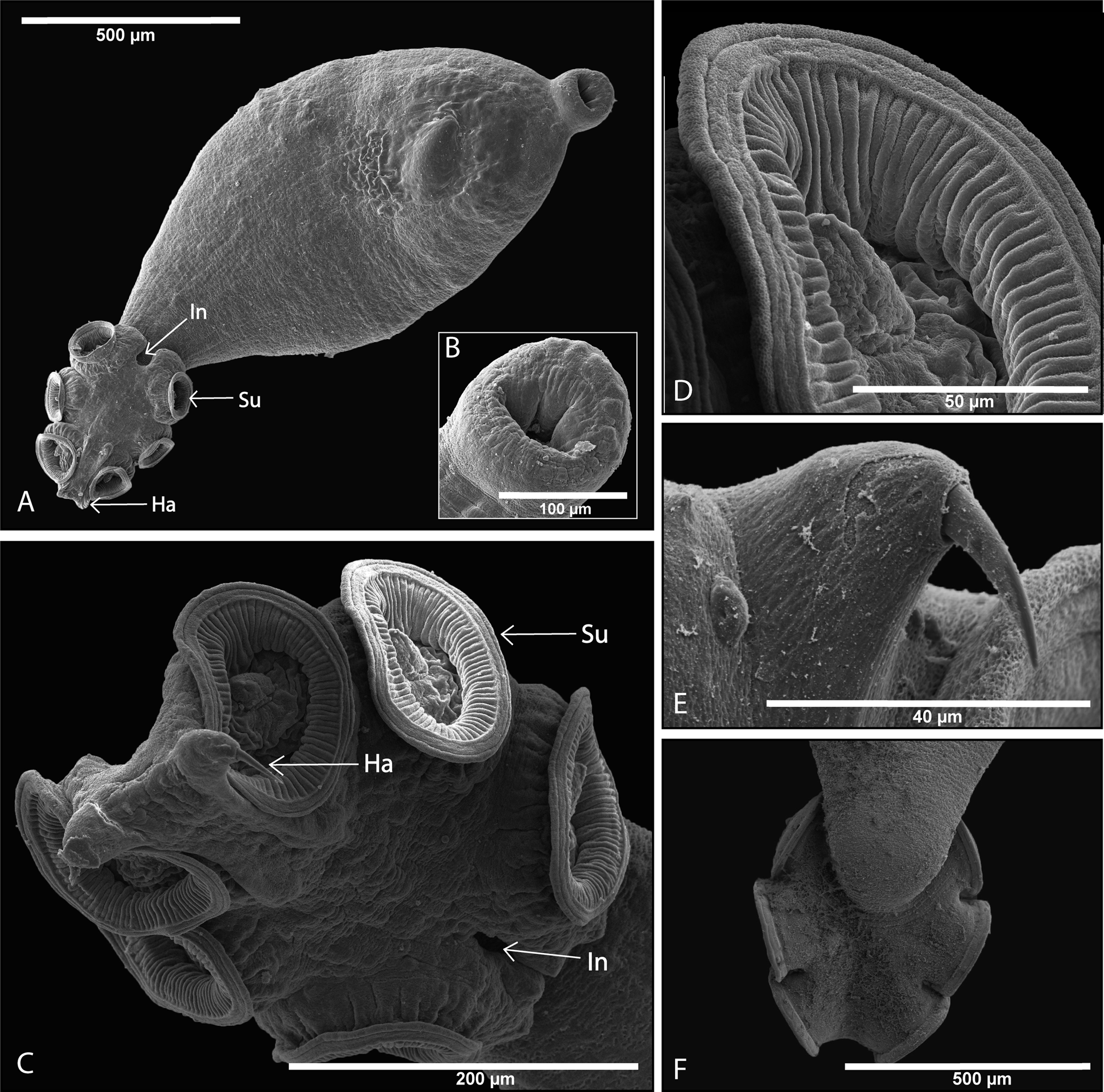
Scanning electron microscopy of Protopolystoma xenopodis, a polyopisthocotylean monogenean. Haptor, Ha.

Silhouettes of bodies of polyopisthocotylean monogeneans. The haptor is the posterior part of the body (at the bottom of each silhouette)

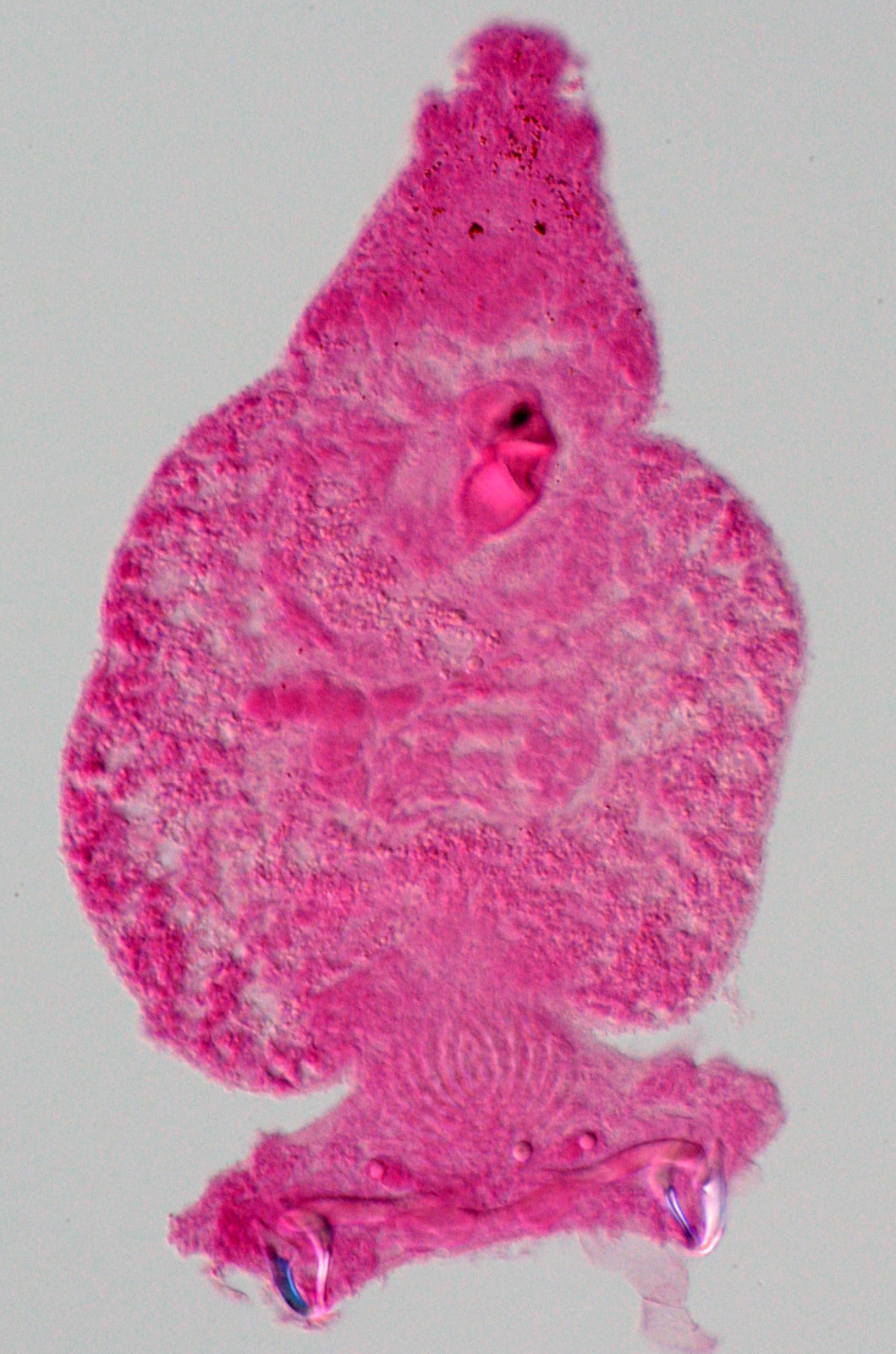
Body of a monopisthocotylean monogenean. The haptor is the posterior part of the body (bottom, after the slender part)

The haptor is the attachment organ of the monogeneans, a group of parasitic Platyhelminthes. The haptor is sometimes called opisthaptor (from opistho-: behind) to emphasize that it is located in the posterior part of the body, and to differentiate it from the prohaptor (from pro-: in front), a structure including glands located at the anterior part of the body. According to Yamaguti (1963), the chief adhesive organ of the monogeneans, the haptor, is posterior, more or less discoid, muscular, may be divided into alveoli or loculi, is usually provided with anchors, has nearly always marginal larval hooklets, or is in a reduced form with anchors. The haptor may consist of symmetrical or asymmetrical, sessile or pedunculate, muscular suckers or clamps with or without supporting sclerites; accessory adhesive organs may be present in form of armed plaques, lappets or appendices.

The structure of the haptor is different in the two major groups constituting the Monogenea, namely the Polyopisthocotylea and the Monopisthocotylea, and is an important part of the diagnosis in both groups.

- In the Polyopisthocotylea, the haptor usually bears several clamps or suckers, and is often asymmetrical.
- In the Monopisthocotylea, the haptor comprises a single, symmetrical attachment unit, and has never haptoral clamps. In the family Diplectanidae, the haptor bears special structures (one ventral and one dorsal) called squamodiscs or lamellodiscs.
