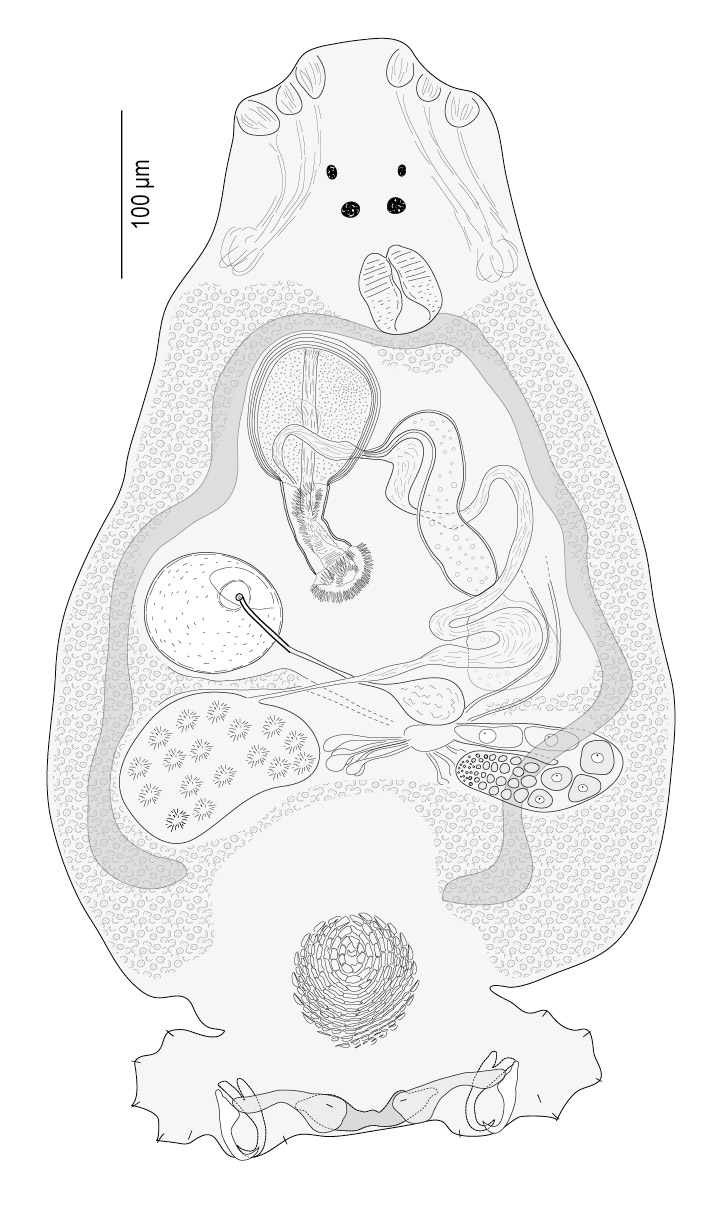
- Echinoplectanum laeve

Scientific classification
- Kingdom: Animalia
- Phylum: Platyhelminthes
- Superclass: Neodermata
- Class: Monogenea; Carus, 1863

Subgroups
- See text.

= Monogenea =

Class of ectoparasitic flatworms

Monogeneans, members of the class Monogenea (/ˌmɒnəˈdʒiːniːə/ MON-ə-JEE-nee-ə), are a group of ectoparasitic flatworms commonly found on the skin, gills, or fins of fish. They have a direct lifecycle and do not require an intermediate host. Adults are hermaphrodites, meaning they have both male and female reproductive structures.

Some monogeneans are oviparous (egg-laying) and some are viviparous (live-bearing). Oviparous varieties release eggs into the water. Viviparous varieties release larvae, which immediately attach to another host. The genus Gyrodactylus is an example of a viviparous variety, while the genus Dactylogyrus is an example of an oviparous variety.

== Signs and symptoms ==
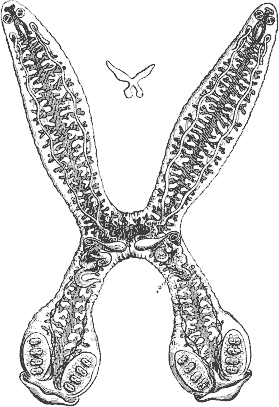
Diplozoon paradoxum

Freshwater fish that become infected with this parasite become lethargic and end up swimming towards the surface of the water. In addition, some may be seen rubbing the bottom or sides of their skin where the parasite is located. Infected skin where the parasite is attached may show areas of scale loss and may produce a pinkish fluid. Gills that are infected may appear swollen and pale. "Pipping", which is gulping for air at the water surface, could indicate severe respiratory distress.

In salt water fish, Monogeneans can infect the skin and gills, resulting in irritations to the host. Heavy infections could result in erratic swimming behavior. Affected gills may become irritated and swollen.

== Characteristics ==
Monogenea are small parasitic flatworms mainly found on skin or gills of fish. They are rarely longer than about 2 cm. A few species infecting certain marine fish are larger, and marine forms are generally larger than those found on freshwater hosts. Monogenea are often capable of dramatically elongating and shortening as they move. Biologists need to ensure that specimens are completely relaxed before measurements are taken.

Monogeneans lack respiratory, skeletal, and circulatory systems but they do have posterior attachment structures in the form of adhesives, clamps, hamuli and suckers. Like other flatworms, Monogenea have no true body cavity (coelom). They have a simple digestive system consisting of a mouth opening with a muscular pharynx and an intestine with no terminal opening (anus).

Monogenea are Platyhelminthes, so are among the lowest invertebrates to possess three embryonic germ layers—endoderm, mesoderm, and ectoderm. In addition, they have a head region that contains concentrated sense organs and nervous tissue (brain).

Like all ectoparasites, monogeneans have well-developed attachment structures. The anterior structures are collectively termed the prohaptor, while the posterior ones are collectively termed the opisthaptor, or simply haptor. The posterior opisthaptor with its hooks, anchors, clamps etc. is typically the major attachment organ.

Generally, monogeneans also are hermaphroditic with functional reproductive organs of both sexes occurring in one individual. Most species are oviparous, but a few are viviparous.

== Phylogeny ==
The following cladogram depicts the phylogenetic relationships of the different monogenean orders:

- Monogenea
  - Monopisthocotylea Polyonchoinea
    - Monocotylidea
    - - Capsalidea
      - - - Lagarocotylidea
          - Montchadskyellidea
        - - Gyrodactylidea
          - Dactylogyridea
  - Polyopisthocotylea Heteronchoinea
    - Polystomatidea
    - Oligonchoinea
      - Chimaericolidea
      - - Diclybothriidea
        - Mazocraeidea

== Systematics and evolution ==
The ancestors of Monogenea were probably free-living flatworms similar to modern Turbellaria. According to the more widely accepted view, "rhabdocoel turbellarians gave rise to monogeneans; these, in turn, gave rise to digeneans, from which the cestodes were derived. Another view is that the rhabdocoel ancestor gave rise to two lines; one gave rise to monogeneans, which gave rise to digeneans, and the other line gave rise to cestodes".

About 50 families and thousands of species are described.

Some parasitologists divide the Monogenea into two (or three) subclasses based on the complexity of their haptor: the Monopisthocotylea have one main part to the haptor, often with hooks or a large attachment disc, whereas the Polyopisthocotylea have multiple parts to the haptor, typically clamps. These groups are also known as Polyonchoinea and Heteronchoinea, respectively. Polyopisthocotyleans are almost exclusively gill-dwelling blood feeders, whereas monopisthocotyleans may live on the gills, skin, and fins.

Monopisthocotylea include:

- Genus Gyrodactylus has no eyespots and is viviparous.
- Genus Dactylogyrus has four eyespots and is oviparous. This is one of the largest metazoan genera, with at least 970 species.
- Genus Neobenedenia much larger and lives on the skin of many tropical marine species, causing problematic infections in marine aquaria.

All of these can cause epizootics in freshwater fish when raised in aquaculture.

Polyopisthocotylea include:

- Genus Diclidophora is primarily found in marine fish and primitive freshwater fish such as sturgeons and paddlefish.
- Genus Protopolystoma is found in aquatic clawed toads (Xenopus species).

== Ecology and lifecycle ==
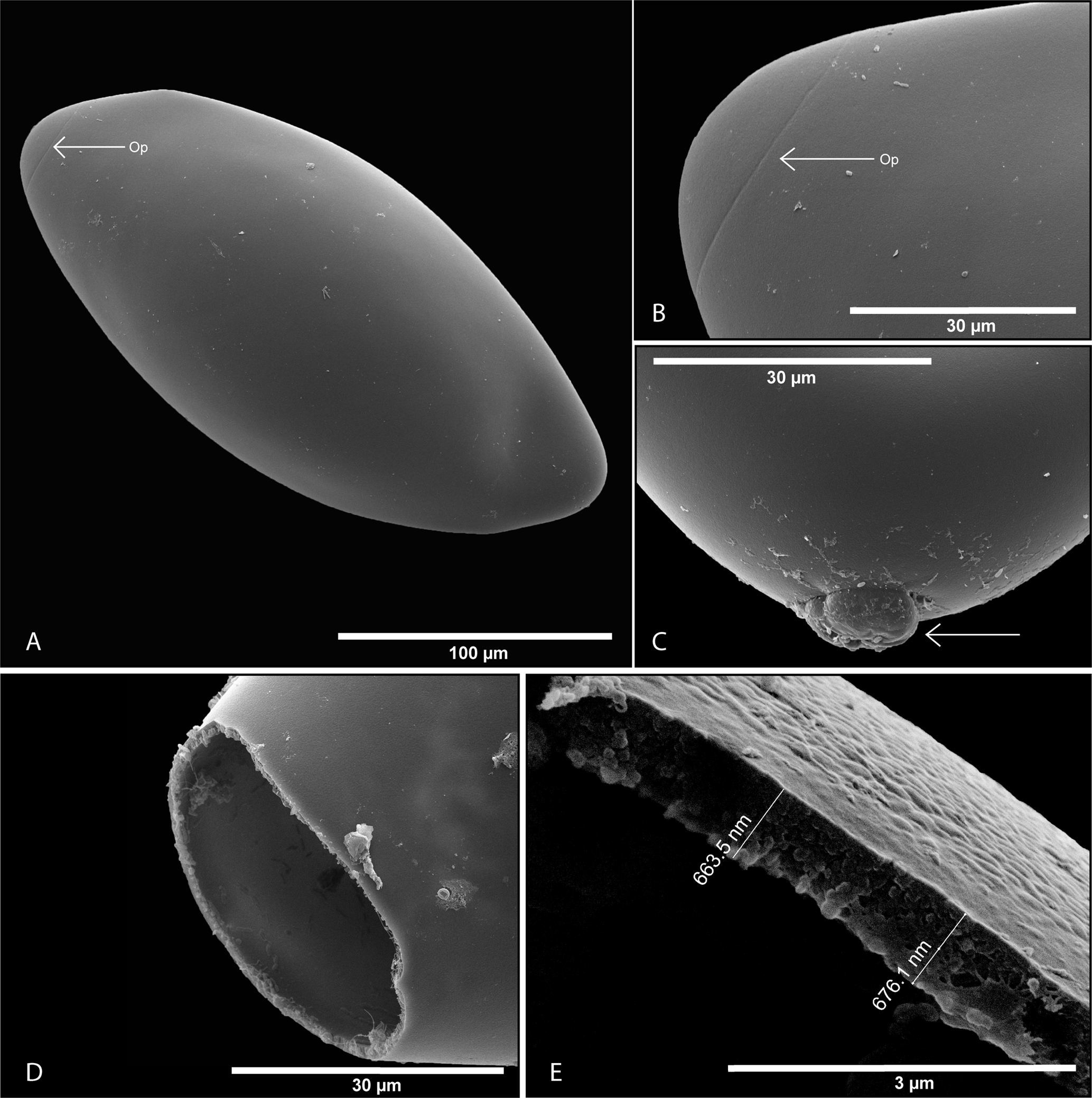
Eggs of the monogenean Protopolystoma xenopodis, a parasite of the African clawed frog Xenopus laevis

Monogeneans possess the simplest lifecycle among the parasitic platyhelminths. They have no intermediate hosts and are ectoparasitic on fish (seldom in the urinary bladder and rectum of cold-blooded vertebrates). Although they are hermaphrodites, the male reproductive system becomes functional before the female part. The eggs hatch releasing a heavily ciliated larval stage known as an oncomiracidium. The oncomiracidium has numerous posterior hooks and is generally the life stage responsible for transmission from host to host.
No known monogeneans infect birds, but one (Oculotrema hippopotami) infects mammals, parasitizing the eye of the hippopotamus.

== See also ==
Gastrocotylinae – Family of worms
