= Pseudorhabdosynochus stigmosus =

Scientific classification
- Kingdom: Animalia
- Phylum: Platyhelminthes
- Class: Monogenea
- Order: Dactylogyridea
- Family: Diplectanidae
- Genus: Pseudorhabdosynochus
- Species: P. stigmosus

Binomial name
- Pseudorhabdosynochus stigmosus Justine & Henry, 2010

Species of flatworm

Pseudorhabdosynochus stigmosus is a species of diplectanid monogenean that is parasitic on the gills of the brownspotted grouper Epinephelus chlorostigma. It was described in 2010.

== Description ==
Pseudorhabdosynochus stigmosus is a small monogenean, 0.2-0.3 mm in length. The species has the general characteristics of other species of Pseudorhabdosynochus, with a flat body and a posterior haptor, which is the organ by which the monogenean attaches itself to the gill of is host. The haptor bears two squamodiscs, one ventral and one dorsal. The sclerotized male copulatory organ, or "quadriloculate organ", has the shape of a bean with four internal chambers, as in other species of Pseudorhabdosynochus.

The vagina includes a sclerotized part, which is a complex structure.

== Etymology ==
According to the authors of the taxon, the specific epithet, stigmosus, Latin for marked, refers to the specific name of the host species, chlorostigma.

== Hosts and localities ==
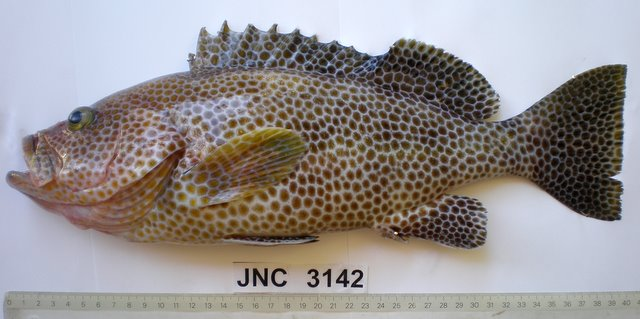
The brownspotted grouper Epinephelus chlorostigma is the type-host of P. stigmosus

The type-host and only recorded host of P. stigmosus is the brownspotted grouper Epinephelus chlorostigma. The type-locality and only recorded locality is external slope of the barrier reef off Nouméa, New Caledonia. In New Caledonia where it was investigated, this fish species harbours on its gill a series of seven species of monogeneans, including the ancyrocephalid Haliotrema sp., the capsalid Allobenedenia cf. epinepheli Yamaguti, 1968, and five diplectanids, namely Pseudorhabdosynochus epinepheli (Yamaguti, 1938), Pseudorhabdosynochus cyanopodus Sigura & Justine, 2008, Pseudorhabdosynochus podocyanus Sigura & Justine, 2008, Pseudorhabdosynochus stigmosus Justine & Henry, 2010, Pseudorhabdosynochus exoticoides Justine & Henry, 2010, and Diplectanum femineum Justine & Henry, 2010.
