= Allobenedenia convoluta =

Scientific classification
- Kingdom: Animalia
- Phylum: Platyhelminthes
- Class: Monogenea
- Order: Capsalidea
- Family: Capsalidae
- Genus: Allobenedenia
- Species: A. convoluta

Binomial name
- Allobenedenia convoluta (Yamaguti, 1937) Yamaguti, 1963

Synonyms
- Allobenedenia conyoluta (Yamaguti, 1937) in Egorova (1997); Benedenia convoluta (Yamaguti, 1937) Price, 1939; Entobdella convoluta (Yamaguti, 1937) Meserve, 1938; Epibdella convoluta Yamaguti, 1937

Species of parasitic flatworm

Allobenedenia convoluta is a species of parasitic monogenean in the family Capsalidae. It has been found in the Seto Inland Sea as well as off the coast of Kagoshima Prefecture and as far as off the coast of Xiamen. It has been found infecting the Hong Kong grouper and the convict grouper.
