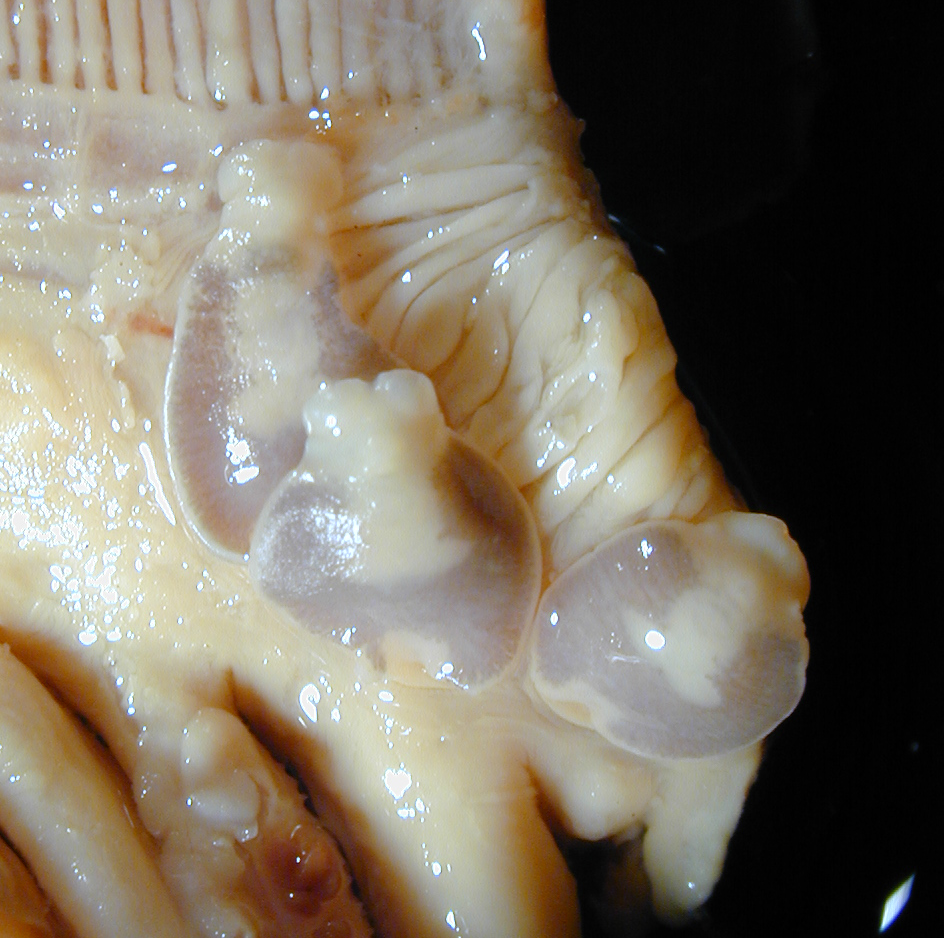
- 3 Lagenivaginopseudobenedenia sp. on the gill of a deepwater longtail red snapper

Scientific classification
- Kingdom: Animalia
- Phylum: Platyhelminthes
- Class: Monogenea
- Order: Capsalidea
- Family: Capsalidae
- Genus: Lagenivaginopseudobenedenia; Yamaguti, 1966

= Lagenivaginopseudobenedenia =

Genus of flatworms

Lagenivaginopseudobenedenia is a genus of monopisthocotylean monogenean (a group of ectoparasitic flatworms), included in the family Capsalidae. The type-species of the genus is Lagenivaginopseudobenedenia etelis Yamaguti, 1966. The genus includes only 2 species, which are both parasitic on the gills of marine fish of the family Lutjanidae.

== Morphology ==
Species of the genus Lagenivaginopseudobenedenia are, like most monogeneans of the family Capsalidae, flat with a posterior disc-shaped haptor which attaches to the gill of their host. Their distinctive feature is a “vagina lageniform, between uterus and right intestinal limb, opening almost midventrally behind cirrus pouch”.

== Etymology ==
Lagenivaginopseudobenedenia, with 27 letters and 17 syllables, is possibly the longest valid generic name of the zoological nomenclature for a non-fossil organism.

In 1966, parasitologist Satyu Yamaguti wrote that the “compound generic name Lagenivaginopseudobenedenia refers to the lageniform vagina and close relationship to Pseudobenedenia”. The name of the genus Pseudobenedenia Johnston, 1931 itself was previously formed from the prefix ‘Pseudo-’ and the genus name Benedenia by Thomas Harvey Johnston in 1931. ‘Pseudo-’ (from Greek ψευδής, pseudes, "lying, false") is commonly used in creating new scientific names for a taxon that superficially appears to be a taxon, but actually is another. Benedenia Diesing, 1858 was a name created by the Austrian zoologist Karl Moriz Diesing in 1858 to honour the Belgian helminthologist Pierre-Joseph van Beneden.

== Hosts ==
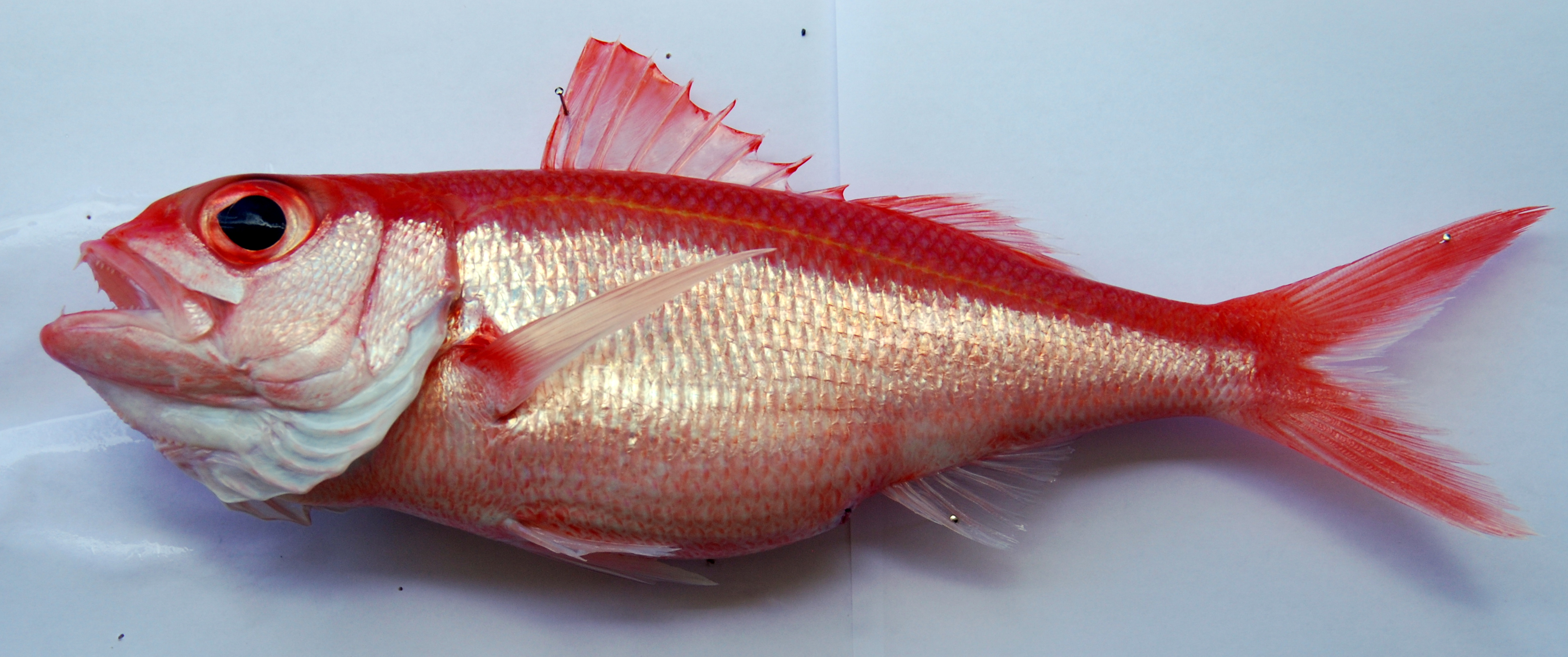
Deep-sea fish of the genus Etelis are host of species of Lagenivaginopseudobenedenia

Hosts of species of monogeneans of the genus Lagenivaginopseudobenedenia are parasitic on fish which are members of the genus Etelis (family Lutjanidae), found in deep-sea in the Pacific Ocean.

== Species ==
Only two species are currently known in this genus.

- Lagenivaginopseudobenedenia etelis Yamaguti, 1966, parasite of the deep-water red snapper Etelis carbunculus off Hawaii and of the deepwater longtail red snapper Etelis coruscans off New Caledonia.
- Lagenivaginopseudobenedenia tinrowi Timofeeva, 1995 parasite of the deep-water red snapper Etelis carbunculus in the Pacific Ocean (26°41' N, 135°22' E).
