= Neobenedenia =

Scientific classification
- Kingdom: Animalia
- Phylum: Platyhelminthes
- Class: Monogenea
- Order: Capsalidea
- Family: Capsalidae
- Genus: Neobenedenia; Yamaguti, 1963

Genius of flatworms

Neobenedenia is a genius of monopisthocotylean monogenean flatworm parasites.

The most common species, Neobenedenia melleni, causes problematic disease in public aquariums. It was named after ichthyologist Ida May Mellen (1877–1970), who worked at the New York Aquarium from 1916 to 1929.

== Species ==
Neobenedenia contains the following species according to the World Register of Marine Species:

- Neobenedenia adenea (Meserve, 1938) Yamaguti, 1963
- Neobenedenia girellae (Hargis, 1955) Yamaguti, 1963
- Neobenedenia isabellae (Meserve, 1938) Yamaguti, 1963
- Neobenedenia longiprostata Bravo-Hollis, 1971
- Neobenedenia melleni (MacCallum, 1927) Yamaguti, 1963
- Neobenedenia muelleri (Meserve, 1938) Yamaguti, 1963
- Neobenedenia pacifica Bravo-Hollis, 1971
- Neobenedenia pargueraensis Dyer, Williams & Bunkley-Williams, 1992
