= Allobenedenia dischizosepta =

Scientific classification
- Kingdom: Animalia
- Phylum: Platyhelminthes
- Class: Monogenea
- Order: Capsalidea
- Family: Capsalidae
- Genus: Allobenedenia
- Species: A. dischizosepta

Binomial name
- Allobenedenia dischizosepta (Suriano, 1975) Bagnato, Bullard & Cremonte, 2017

Synonyms
- Tetrasepta dischizosepta Suriano, 1975

Species of parasitic flatworm

Allobenedenia dischizosepta is a species of parasitic monogenean in the family Capsalidae. It has been found in waters off the coast of Argentina. It has been found infecting species of fish in the genus Acanthistius, such as the Argentine seabass.

== Description ==
The body of Allobenedenia dischizosepta is opaque in life. Its body margins are smooth and equally rounded. It has two pairs of eyespots, of which the posterior pair is larger than the anterior. Its attachment organs exhibit bilateral symmetry, each having three glandular pads and two submarginal suckers. Its haptor is disc-like in shape, with five loculi formed by three anterior and two posterior septa with a marginal membrane. The posterior-most locule is flanked by sclerites. There are 14 haptoral hooklets, with six per side of the haptor along with one pair between the haptoral sclerites. Accessoral sclerites are bifid, with the distal end coming to a sharp point that is slightly bent to the side, protruding from the ventral haptor surface. Among its hamuli, the anterior hamuli are the largest, and are curved backwards for most of their length. The posterior hamuli are triangular with a hook at their distal end. The pharynx is egg-shaped and papillate. Its esophagus is indistinct. The intestinal ceca extend towards the posterior, and have extensive laterally directed diverticula, which are difficult to trace when coursing through the vitellarium.

It has two testes that are irregularly shaped but generally spheroid; they're longer than they are wide and between the ceca, juxtaposed near the middle of the body. The vasa efferentia comprise paired ducts that extend to the middle of the body from the anterior margin of the testes, which unite between the testes. The vas deferens extend towards the anterior and left of the ovary and vitelline reservoir, looping several times along the reservoir's margin and coursing between the ootype and proximal vagina before arching towards the right around the ootype, turning and coursing along the right side before penetrating the penis sac and meeting with the ejaculatory duct. The penis sac envelops the male accessory gland reservoir, the ejaculatory duct, and the penis, directing left between the pharynx and the uterus, before opening at the level of the pharynx within a common genital atrium. The male genital pore is anterior to the female pore within the atrium. The male accessory gland reservoir is sphere-like and constricted distrally where it connects with the ejaculatory duct. The ejaculatory duct is straight when the penis is extruded, and convoluted when it is withdrawn. The penis is appendix-like and elongated.

The ovary occupies the space between the male accessory gland reservoir and the testes. It is between the ceca and sphere-like in shape, and encloses the germarium. The oviduct emanates from the anterior margin of the ovary and extends along its midline to the vitelline reservoir. The vitelline duct extends from the reservoir and connects with the oviduct at the level of the male accessory gland reservoir to form the ovo-vitelline duct. The ovo-vitelline duct continues along the midline before connecting with the ootype. The ootype occupies the space between the penis sac and vitelline reservoir, and is surrounded by the Mehlis gland. The uterus extends to the left of the anterior and is dilated proximally, opening within a common genital atrium. There is one vaginal pore, posterior to the common genital opening. The vagina is a simple duct extending from the vaginal pore, comprising a tube-like distal portion and a laterally expanded proximal portion. The proximal part of the vagina is thick-walled. The vitellarium is coextensive with the intestine, distributed throughout the body from the pharynx to the haptor. The egg is tetrahedral in shape and has a proximal filament.
