= Alloencotyllabe =

Scientific classification
- Kingdom: Animalia
- Phylum: Platyhelminthes
- Class: Monogenea
- Order: Capsalidea
- Family: Capsalidae
- Genus: Alloencotyllabe; Khalil & Abdul-Salam, 1988
- Species: A. caranxi

Binomial name
- Alloencotyllabe caranxi Khalil & Abdul-Salam, 1988

Species of parasitic flatworm

Alloencotyllabe is a genus of parasitic monogenean in the family Capsalidae. It is monotypic, containing the sole species Alloencotyllabe caranxi. The specific epithet was derived from the type host of the species, which was fish belonging to the genus Caranx. It has been found from type specimens in the Persian Gulf.

== Description ==
Alloencotyllabe caranxi is found on the pharyngeal plate of its host. The body of the species is elongated, around 13.5–15.1 mm (0.53–0.59 in) long. Its maximum width is 1.74–2.22 mm (0.069–0.087 in) in the region of the testes. The body gradually tapers to the muscular peduncle, ending with the opisthaptor, which is deeply embedded in the host's tissue. The prohaptor consists of two small lobes that each bear one round, muscular sucker. The lobes are connected by the hood, which is covered with rows of spines directed forward. The muscular suckers are 0.17–0.25 mm (0.0067–0.0098 in) in diameter. Ocelli are not observed in adults. The spines are large and arranged in an inverted "U" pattern; they guard the entrance to the ventral anterior pouch, where the mouth, pharynx and genital opening are located. The function of these spines is unknown, but it is presumed to be for the purpose of dislodging epithelial cells. The opisthaptor is bell-shaped, 1.06–1.21 mm (0.042–0.048 in) in diameter, with a folded marginal membrane and no radial septa. The opisthaptor is armed with hamuli, with one pair of large hamuli 0.35–0.43 mm (0.014–0.017 in) long, and one pair of small hamuli 0.026–0.031 mm (0.0010–0.0012 in) long. Additionally, it has 14 marginal hooklets around 9–11 μm (0.00035–0.00043 in) long. Its mouth opening is in its anterior pouch and leads into the pharynx; it is about 0.34–0.42 by 0.43–0.48 mm (0.013–0.017 by 0.017–0.019 in). It has a large pharynx. It has intestinal ceca with lateral branches.

The species has two side-by-side testes, oval in shape, about 0.42–0.56 by 0.29–0.37 mm (0.017–0.022 by 0.011–0.015 in) in size. The vasa efferentia arise from the anterior side of the testes and join the vas deferens. The vas deferens pass on the left side of the ovary to open at the base of the penis; before entering the penis it becomes convoluted and swollen, acting as a seminal vesicle. Its penis is large and robust, with two parts: a sac-like posterior and a cone-like anterior, with the anterior covered with about 20–24 rows of large spines directed towards the posterior. The penis is in the anterior pouch. The prostatic reservoir is inside the penis, and the prostatic duct joins the ejaculatory duct to open at the tip of the penis. Its ovary is generally round, about 0.23–0.32 mm (0.0091–0.0126 in) in diameter, and encloses the small seminal receptacle. The vitellarium extends from the level of the vitelline reservoir; a pair of vitelline ducts form the vitelline reservoir. The vaginal pore is large and guarded by two sets of large denticulate glands. The vagina is pouch-like, with two sets of external glands. The pouch leads into a large oblique pouch under the vitelline reservoir. Ducts from external glands near the vagina extend to open into the vaginal pouch. The uterus is a large triangular sac; the metraterm is slender and tubular, and extends along the left side of the penis to open into the anterior pouch. The vitelline reservoir is large and anterior to the ovary. Its eggs are tetrahedral, about 75–86 by 65–79 μm (0.0030–0.0034 by 0.0026–0.0031 in) with three filaments that are long and twisted. Only one egg is seen in the uterus at a time.

== Hosts ==
Alloencotyllabe caranxi is known to infect members of the genus Caranx. The type specimen was found in the pharyngeal cavity of a species of the genus, in groups ranging from nine to fifteen specimens attached together on the lower pharyngeal plate. The lining of the pharynx was found to be growing around the opisthaptor; specimens of the parasite were deeply embedded in the tissue and could only be released after careful dissection.
