= Hamour =

Name for various fish

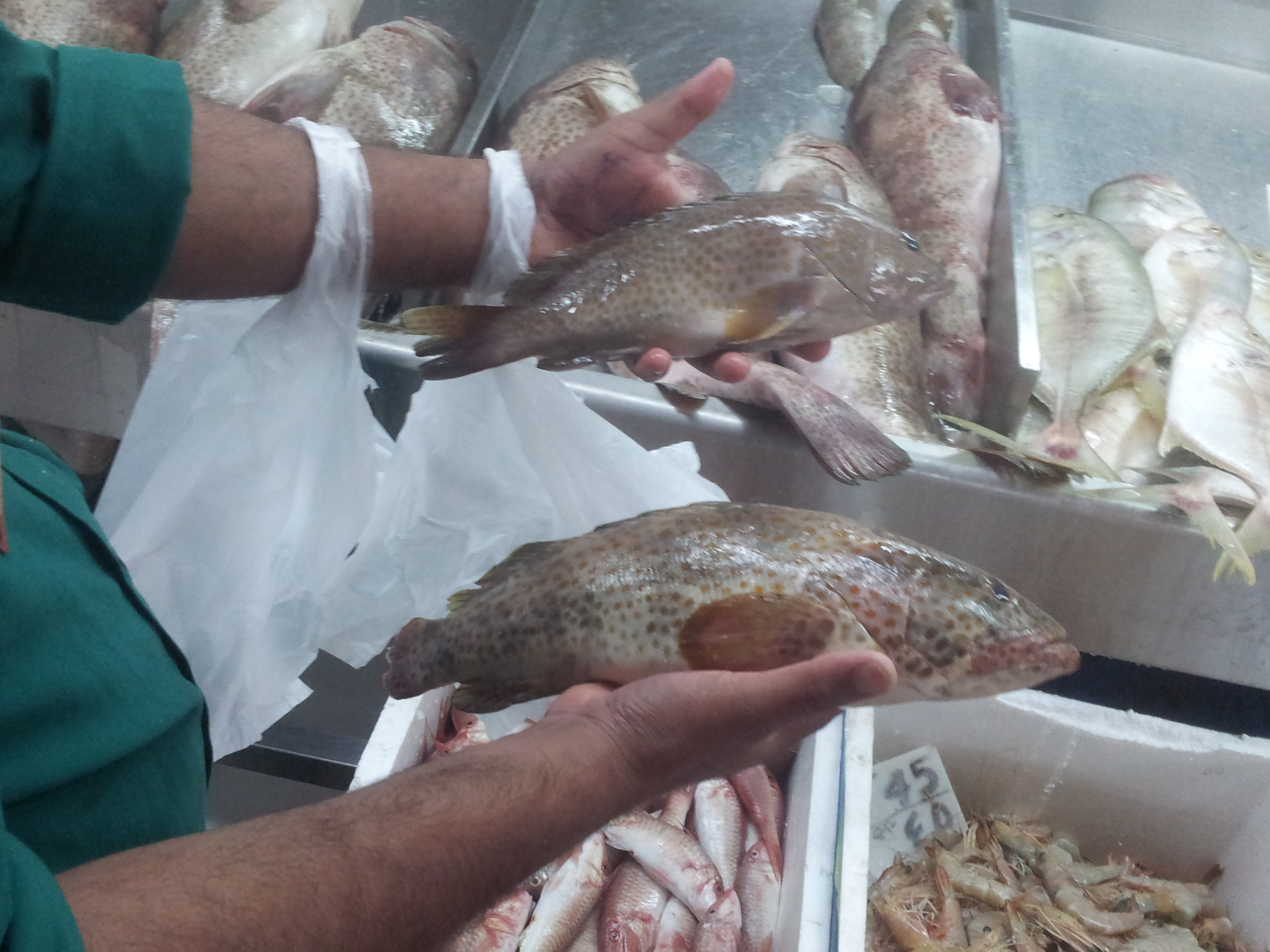
Varieties of hamour fish from Gulf fish market

The hamour or hammour (Arabic: هَامُّوْر, romanized: hāmmūr) is any of a number of fish, notably the goldspotted rockcod (Epinephelus coioides) and brown spotted reef cod (Epinephelus chlorostigma), as well as other closely related species of the Persian Gulf.

== GCC ==
The Gulf Cooperation Council keeps fishery records on the fish caught in their territorial waters. Of the estimated 540 species of fish in the Persian Gulf, 11 different species are commonly referred to as "hamour". In records kept by the state of Qatar, there is a clear indication that the amount of "hamour" being caught is rapidly declining, and has dropped sharply since 2008. The decline of the culturally important and prized hamour fish prompted Qatar to start a program to farm the fish species, focusing on the most highly valued Epinephelus coioides. Yet the same states keep record on a "hamour group", roughly relating to the catch-all term "grouper". This includes the brown spotted reef cod, known in the Persian Gulf states as "souman", but also as "hammour".

== Iran ==
The words "hamour" and "soman" (Persian: سومان) are also used in Iran to describe similar species of fish, for example the Hamour-e Khaldar-e Qahvei (Persian: هامور خالدار قهوه‌ای), which is the Persian name for the brown-spotted reef cod, but which is known in Arabic simply as "hamour".

== Bibliography ==
- Heemstra, P. C.; Randall, J. E. (1993). Groupers of the World (Family Serranidae, Subfamily Epinephelinae). An annotated and illustrated catalogue of the grouper, rockcod, hind, coral grouper and lyretail species known to date. FAO Species Catalogue. Vol. 16. FAO Fish. Synop.
