= Allomegalocotyla =

Scientific classification
- Kingdom: Animalia
- Phylum: Platyhelminthes
- Class: Monogenea
- Order: Capsalidea
- Family: Capsalidae
- Genus: Allomegalocotyla; Yamaguti, 1963

Genus of flatworms

Allomegalocotyla is a genus of monopisthocotylean monogeneans, included in the family Capsalidae. All species in this genus are parasitic.

== Species ==
These species are currently recognized in the genus:

- Allomegalocotyla gabbari Buhrnheim, Gomes & Varela, 1973
- Allomegalocotyla johnstoni (Robinson, 1961) Yamaguti, 1963
