= Microcotyle pomatomi =

Scientific classification
- Kingdom: Animalia
- Phylum: Platyhelminthes
- Class: Monogenea
- Order: Mazocraeidea
- Family: Microcotylidae
- Genus: Microcotyle
- Species: M. pomatomi

Binomial name
- Microcotyle pomatomi Goto, 1899

Synonyms
- Paramicrocotyle pomatomi (Goto, 1899) Caballero & Bravo-Hollis, 1972; Microcotyle (Microcotyle) pomatomi (Goto, 1899) Unnithan1971; Microcotyle australiensis MacCallum, 1921; Microcotyle debueni Mané-Garzón, 1959; Microcotyle temnodontis Sandars, 1945

Species of worms

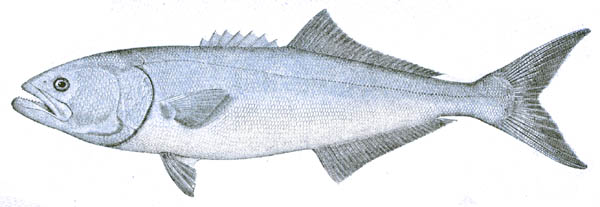
The bluefish Pomatomus saltatrix is the type host of Microcotyle pomatomi

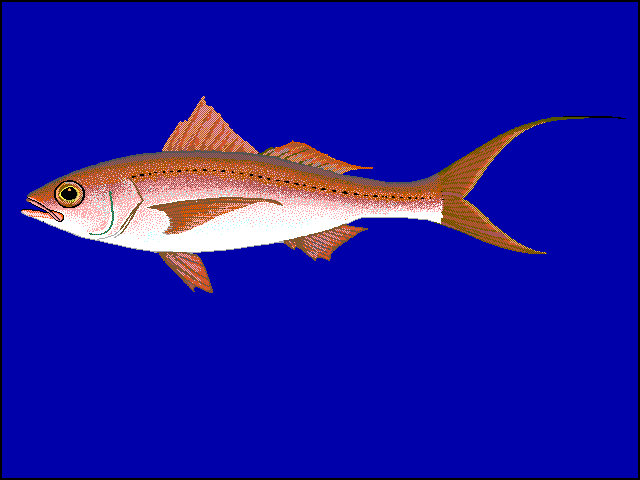
The deepwater longtail red snapper Etelis coruscans is also a host of Microcotyle pomatomi

Microcotyle pomatomi is a species of monogenean that is parasitic on the gills of a marine fish. It belongs to the family Microcotylidae.

== Taxonomy ==
Microcotyle pomatomi was described by Goto in 1899 from the gills of the bluefish Pomatomus saltatrix (Pomatomidae) collected at Newport off Rhode Island, United States. It was redescribed by Lebedev et al., (1969) from Pomatomus saltatrix off south-western Africa and by Williams (1991) on the base of 7 specimens from the gills of Pomatomus saltatrix off western Australia.

Williams (1991) compared Microcotyle collected from Pomatomus saltatrix off Western Australia with M. pomotomi, M. australiensis, M. temnodontis and M. debueni from the same host and noted important problems with the parasite taxonomy. The only significant morphological difference detected in the material examined by William was the distribution of spines of the genital atrium in specimens from Western Australia vs specimens from South Africa . However, this differences was considered insufficient to separate these specimens as different species. William (1991) concluded that M. australiensis, M. temnodontis, and M. debueni were erroneously described as distinct species, and considered all of them junior synonyms of M. pomatomi due to the overall similarity in morphology and overlap in measurements, not to mention that those species were described from the same host without any comparison with M. pomatomi.

In 1972, Caballero y Caballero and Bravo-Hollis erected the genus Paramicrocotyle to describe Paramicrocotyle tampicensis and Paramicrocotyle atriobursata off Mexico; they placed within this genus 16 species previously assigned to the genus Microcotyle. including M. temnodontis and M. pomatomi. Unnithan (1971) placed M. pomatomi in the nominal subgenus Microcotyle as Microcotyle (Microcotyle) pomatomi and M. australiensis in the new genus and subgenus Caenomicrocotyle and Notaster as Caenomicrocotyle (Notaster) australiensis. However, these two species were returned to the genus Microcotyle by Mamaev who considered Paramicrocotyle a junior subjective synonym of Microcotyle.

Due to the confusion of the nomenclature surrounding the validity of Caenomicrocotyle-Notasterand Paramicrocotyle, these species were also synonymised with M. pomatomi and retained in the genus Microcotyle until a detailed revision of the Microcotylidae.

The specific epithet pomatomi is derived from the generic name of the type host Pomatomus saltatrix (Pomatomidae).

== Description ==
Microcotyle pomatomi has the general morphology of all species of Microcotyle, with a flat syn1metrical elongated body comprising an anterior part which contains most organs and a posterior part called the haptor. The haptor is symmetrical and bears 70 pairs of clamps, arranged as two rows, one on each side. The clamps of the haptor attach the animal to the gill of the fish. There are also two small buccal suckers at the anterior extremity. The digestive organs include an anterior, terminal mouth, a muscular pharynx, a moderate length oesophagus ending a little behind the genital atriuml pore, and a posterior intestine with two branches provided with numerous lateral diverticula on the inner and outer sides except for the terminal portion of the branche. Each adult contains male and female reproductive organs. The reproductive organs include an anterior genital atrium opening a little in front of the hind end of the oesophagus and armed with slightly recurved conical spines, a dorsal vagina opening much behind the posterior end of the oesophagus as the common genital opening is before it, a single irregularly S-shaped ovary, and 50 small testes which are posterior to the ovary, extending from the hind end of the ovary to near the hind end of the body proper.

The sequence of the species' ITS2 rDNA gene has been published.

=== Pathology ===
The species has been reported as causing mortality in the bluefish and the striped bass.

== Hosts and localities ==
The type host of Microcotyle pomatomi is the bluefish Pomatomus saltatrix (Pomatomidae). It was also reported on the Smooth weakfish Cynoscion leiarchus (Sciaenidae), the deepwater longtail red snapper Etelis coruscans (Lutjanidae), the Striped bass Morone saxatilis (Moronidae), and from the gills of mulloway Argyrosomus japonicus. The type-locality is off Rhode Island, United States. Microcotyle pomatomi was recorded off western Australia, Egypt, Brazil, Japan, Turkey, New York, and off south-western Africa.
