= Etelis boweni =

Scientific classification
- Kingdom: Animalia
- Phylum: Chordata
- Class: Actinopterygii
- Order: Acanthuriformes
- Family: Lutjanidae
- Genus: Etelis
- Species: E. boweni

Binomial name
- Etelis boweni Andrews, Fernandez-Silva, Randall & Ho, 2021

Species of fish

Etelis boweni, known as Bowen's snapper or giant ruby snapper, is a species of ray-finned fish, a snapper belonging to the family Lutjanidae. It was discovered in deeper waters in the Indo-West Pacific region by a team of marine biologists from the United States, Spain, and Taiwan. It was named on March 9, 2021, after Brian Bowen, a researcher at the University of Hawaii.

== Morphology ==
Etelis boweni has a fusiform, orange red body that gradually becomes pink midway down its body and silvery white on its underbelly. E. boweni is similar to Etelis carbunculus, but has several key differences. E. boweni has a much larger adult body size at nearly twice the size as E. carbunculus. E. boweni also has a protruding lower jaw, black tip on the top of the tail fin and larger snout length than that of E. carbunculus.

== Distribution ==
Etelis boweni has been collected from the Red Sea and Western Australia. Genetic samples of E. boweni have also been collected from Seychelles, Christmas Island, New Caledonia, Wallis and Futuna, Fiji, Tonga, and Samoa. Although the distribution of E. boweni' is largely sympatric with that of E. carbunculus, E. boweni is unlikely to be found in the Hawaiian Archipelago.

Etelis boweni has been found at depths from 209-319m.

== Environmental Threats ==
Etelis boweni is threatened with overfishing. From 2016 to present, E. boweni has been in the 50 most abundant species found in the deepwater demersal fisheries of Southern Indonesia. Catch data suggests that the majority of E. boweni caught have not had the opportunity to reproduce or reach maturity before capture. However, fisheries trends indicate that overfishing risks in the area are improving.
