= E. R. Sanborn =

Elwin Roswell Sanborn (1869 - December 19, 1947) was the first official photographer for the New York Zoological Park, now known as the Bronx Zoo. A self-taught photographer, Sanborn learned to photograph wildlife by doing it. He recorded nearly every species that came into the Bronx Zoo during the first three decades of the twentieth century using black and white photography.

== Career ==
Elwin Roswell Sanborn began his career at the Bronx Zoo in 1899, the same year it opened to the public on 265 acres in the northwestern area of the Bronx.

Prior to opening, the Bronx Zoo had its share of uninvited visitors curious about the new park. Sanborn, seeking out animals to sketch, was among them. The Bronx Zoo's first director, William Temple Hornaday, saw and recruited the young artist to help him meet a press deadline for the park's first guidebook for opening day in November 1899. It launched a lifetime career for Sanborn with the organization.

Sanborn was among the original staff of Bronx Zoo. His first role with guidebook production led to an array of responsibilities as Hornaday's right-hand man.

Sanborn first appeared on the books as a clerk and gatekeeper making fifty dollars a month. He scrupulously monitored Bronx Zoo staff and visitors as they arrived on horse-drawn carriages by way of cobblestone streets. Once in the park, he sold them guidebooks and photographs taken by freelancers that had been hired by Hornaday. It was the director's belief that there was not enough work for a full-time photographer, a notion that was dispelled as the call for creative services increased.

With no known formal education beyond the grade school he attended in Bradford, Pennsylvania, chief assistant Sanborn met the challenge.

Sanborn's signature on deliveries of freelancers’ negatives read “Curator in Charge of Negatives.” It was an assumed title, but Sanborn kept it. He went on to establish the Bronx Zoo's first photo department in 1901 and become its official photographer and assistant editor under Hornaday. Sanborn expanded his titles to include official photographer of the New York Aquarium when it became part of the New York Zoological Society (now the Wildlife Conservation Society) in 1902. Recognizing Sanborn's attention for detail, Hornaday handed over his own title of editor to Sanborn in 1909. Sanborn became editor of The Bulletin of the New York Zoological Society, along with other journals and publications.

A slight, energetic man, Sanborn was a perfectionist at his acquired professions and in his dress, and his eccentricities led to legends. According to one, Sanborn kept eighteen complete changes of clothing in his Bronx Zoo darkroom.

The gear Sanborn used was larger than most of the wildlife he photographed. Heavy cameras and glass plate negatives moved with him from location to location. Action shots were not the demand; instead, Sanborn sought to produce clear, sharp shots that showed the animals exactly as they appeared and with an attractive background. He established his own style by creating camera setups that captured the likes of monkeys, jaguars, and especially fish. When extra light was needed, he illuminated his subjects by igniting flash powder that flared brightly then covered all in a cloud of gray smoke. It was difficult on any day, but there were no incidents until the winter of 1926-1927. His use of flash powder led to an explosion in his darkroom. It left Sanborn badly burned and unable to work for some time. Based on his diminished output following the accident, it is possible he never fully recovered.

== Expeditions ==
In addition to his regular duties as official photographer and editor, Sanborn traveled the globe on several New York Zoological Society expeditions to cover conservation efforts.

In the early 1900s, massacres of the American bison had brought the iconic species to near extinction. The Bronx Zoo, led by Hornaday and the American Bison Society raised a small herd for reintroduction to their home range. In 1907, Sanborn accompanied H. R. Mitchell, chief clerk for the Bronx Zoo, and the bison during their shipment via railroad from the Bronx to Cache, Oklahoma. He documented the event.

In 1928, Sanborn journeyed with Charles H. Townsend, director of the New York Aquarium, to the Galapagos Islands. He photographed the activities as they unfolded. The team brought back 100 giant tortoises to protect the vanishing breed.

== Contributions and legacy ==
Sanborn was a distinctive artist in his trades. He gained world recognition as an editor of science publications and as a photographer. His work appeared in numerous publications and prints.

Sanborn laid the foundation of the NYZP photo collection with 14,216 negatives of his subjects including mammals, birds, reptiles, and fish as well as the park's buildings and scenes, and his expeditions.

He retired in 1934 after 35 years of service, still holding the title of official photograph and editor.

He was an unpredictable individualist to the end. Around 1914, he refused participation in the Bronx Zoo's newly established pension plan, only to ask for concession to join in later life. At a last turn, he left his estate to the same fund in his final will.

Sanborn died at age 78 on December 19, 1947.
