= Pseudorhabdosynochus satyui =

Scientific classification
- Kingdom: Animalia
- Phylum: Platyhelminthes
- Class: Monogenea
- Order: Dactylogyridea
- Family: Diplectanidae
- Genus: Pseudorhabdosynochus
- Species: P. satyui

Binomial name
- Pseudorhabdosynochus satyui Justine, 2009

Species of flatworm

Pseudorhabdosynochus satyui is a species of diplectanid monogenean that is parasitic on the gills of the Hong Kong grouper (Epinephelus akaara). It was described in 2009.

== Description ==
Pseudorhabdosynochus satyui is a small monogenean, 0.5-0.7 mm in length. The species has the general characteristics of other species of Pseudorhabdosynochus, with a flat body and a posterior haptor, which is the organ by which the monogenean attaches itself to the gill of is host. The haptor bears two squamodiscs, one ventral and one dorsal.

The sclerotized male copulatory organ, or "quadriloculate organ", has the shape of a bean with four internal chambers, as in other species of Pseudorhabdosynochus.

The vagina includes a sclerotized part, which is a complex structure.

The species was found in 2009 among specimens of other species of diplectanid monogeneans, on two slides made in 1936 par the Japanese parasitologist Satyu Yamaguti and deposited in the Meguro Parasitological Museum in Tokyo, Japan. Only two specimens of the species were found. Jean-Lou Justine wrote "the author is aware that describing a new species from only two specimens is not optimal. However, P. satyui has a sclerotised vagina and measurements which enable its differentiation from other species, and the specimens are already deposited on two slides of good quality".

== Etymology ==
The species Pseudorhabdosynochus satyui was named in honor of "Satyu Yamaguti, a parasitologist of immense reputation, who collected the type-specimens".

== Hosts and localities ==
The type-host and only recorded host of P. satyui is the Hong Kong grouper (Epinephelus akaara). The type-locality and only recorded locality is Off Tarumi, Inland Sea of Japan.
