= Epinephelus geoffroyi =

Conservation status
- Least Concern (IUCN 3.1)

Scientific classification
- Kingdom: Animalia
- Phylum: Chordata
- Class: Actinopterygii
- Order: Perciformes
- Suborder: Percoidei
- Family: Epinephelidae
- Genus: Epinephelus
- Species: E. geoffroyi

Binomial name
- Epinephelus geoffroyi (Klunzinger, 1870)

Synonyms
- Serranus celebicus var. multipunctatus Kossmann & Räuber, 1877; Serranus geoffroyi Klunzinger, 1870

Species of fish

Epinephelus geoffroyi, the Red Sea spotted grouper, is a species of marine fish in the genus Epinephelus in the grouper family. The species was first described in 1870. E. geoffroyi was previously considered a synonym of Epinephelus chlorostigma, but Randall et al. recognized it as a valid species in 2013.

== Distribution and habitat ==
Epinephelus geoffroyi has a scattered distribution in the northwestern Indian Ocean. This species is found throughout the Red Sea and the Gulf of Aden. In 2015, a wandering individual was recorded in the eastern Mediterranean, having entered it via the Suez Canal from the Red Sea as a Lessepsian migrant. Adults live around coral reefs and reefs on sandy bottoms, ranging in depth from 3 to 32 m (10 to 105 ft).

== Description ==
Adult E. geoffroyi has a maximum size of more than 50 cm (20 in). They begin to mature when they reach a length of about 28 cm (11 in) and are 3 years old; The average total length when switching sex is 48 cm (19 in). The body is elongated, oval, has a beige colour with rounded black-brown spots covering the head and body (except for the abdomen), including on the fins (spots on the lower body are orange). The caudal fin is rounded. The posterior edge of the caudal fin contains a row of dark spots. The pupil is surrounded by a ring bordered with yellow.

Number of spines in the dorsal fin: 11; The number of soft-fin rays in the dorsal fin: 16 - 18; Number of spines in anal fin: 3; Number of soft-fin rays in anal fin: 8; Number of spines in the ventral fins: 1; Number of soft-fin rays in ventral fins: 5.

Epinephelus geoffroyi feeds on smaller fish, molluscs and crustaceans. They live alone. E. geoffroyi is a target of commercial fisheries.
