= Ida Mellen =

American ichthyologist

Ida May Mellen
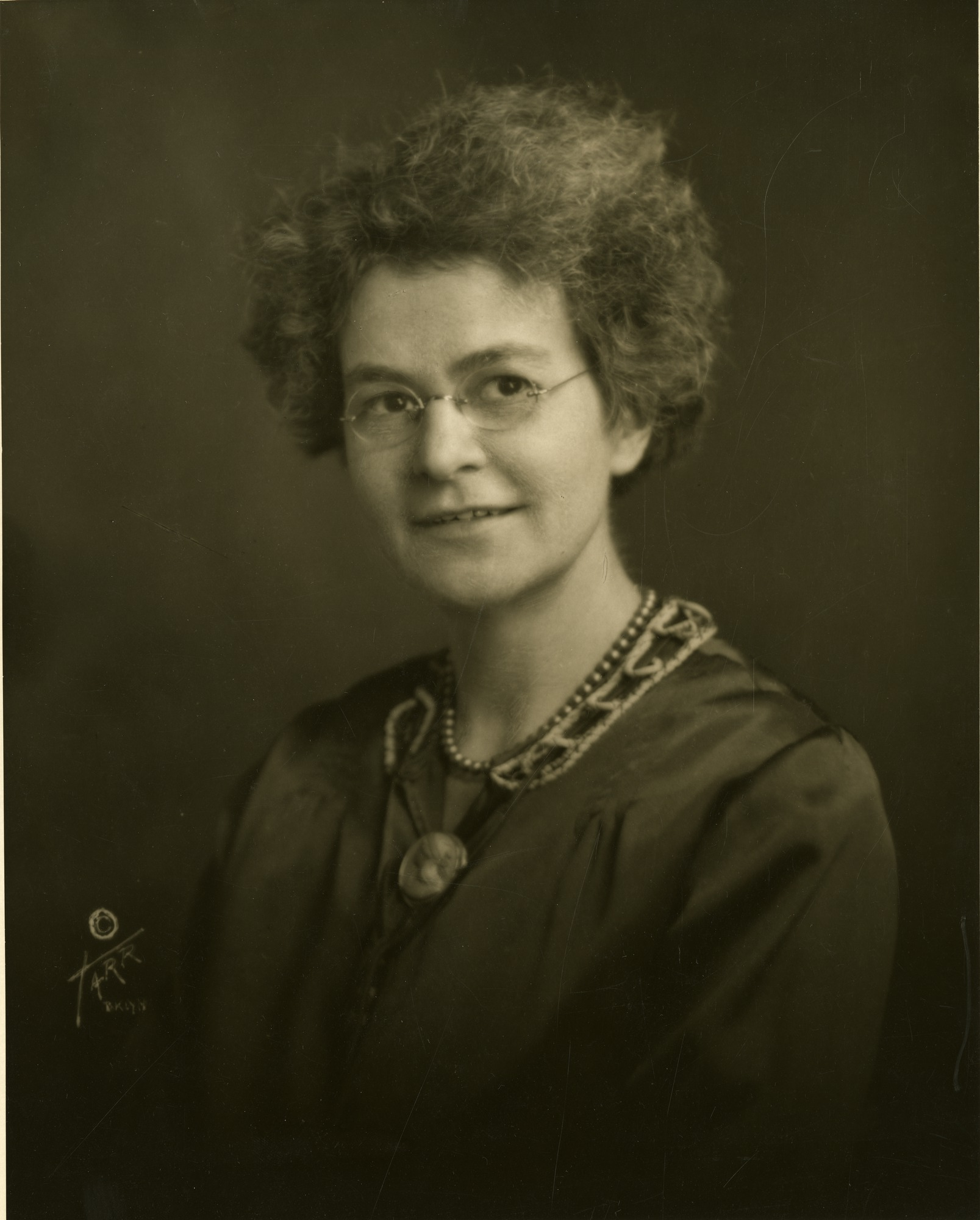
- Born: 1877
- Died: 1970 (aged 92–93)
- Other names: pseudonyms George Otis and Esmeralda de Mar
- Education: Lockwood Academy, Browne's Business School
- Scientific career
- Fields: Biology, Ichthyology
- Workplaces: Marine Biological Lab at Wood's Hole, New York Aquarium

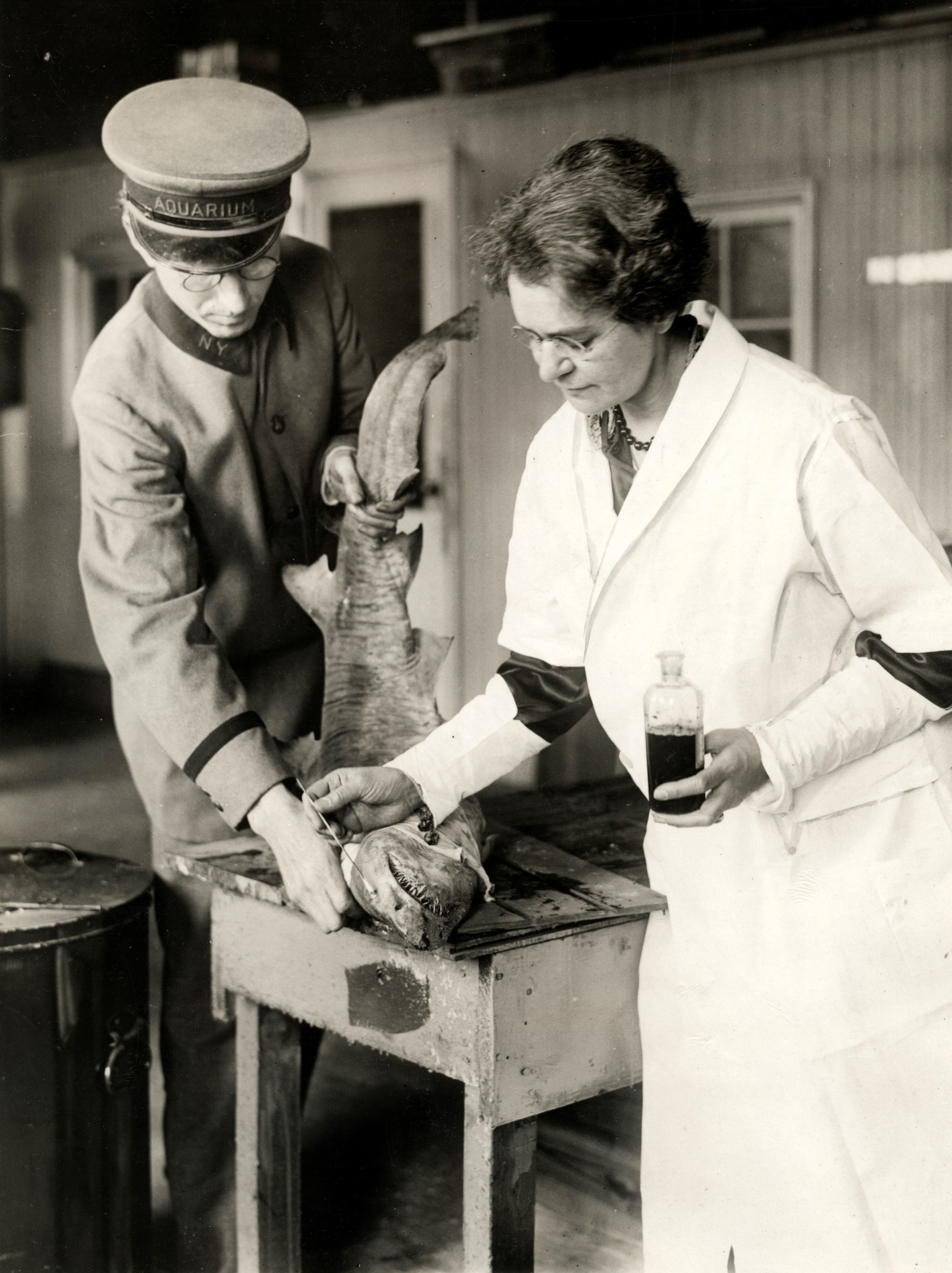
Mellen caring for a baby shark at New York Aquarium in 1927

Ida May Mellen (1877–1970) was an American ichthyologist and biologist. She worked at the New York Aquarium from 1916 to 1929.

She was born in New York City to Mary Davis and Andrew Jackson Mellen in 1877. After graduating from the Lockwood Academy in Brooklyn, Mellen attended Browne’s Business School, 76 Court Street, Brooklyn, from which she graduated in 1900.

She spent several years as a law reporter in New York while she also studied at the Marine Biological Laboratory at Woods Hole (1908–1910). She joined the New York Aquarium in 1916 as secretary to Aquarium Director Charles H. Townsend, and later became involved in the scientific work of the Aquarium.

Within a short time, she was writing articles for the Bulletin of the New York Zoological Society, which operated the Aquarium. Her first article, “Some Babies of the Sea,” appeared in the Bulletin in March 1917. She frequently contributed to the Bulletin and published several books, including Fishes in the Home (1927).

In 1929, she left the New York Aquarium. The reason for her departure is unclear. But over the years, she continued her own research and writing on a variety of topics, not just fish, and she published both fiction and nonfiction. She adopted the pseudonyms George Otis and Esmeralda de Mar for some of her work.

Mellen died in 1970. The fish platyhelminth parasite Neobenedenia melleni of aquarium fish was named in her honor.

== Selected publications ==
- Fishes in the Home (1927)
- The Young Folks' Book of Fishes (1927)
- Roof Gardening (1929)
- 1001 Answers to Questions about Aquarium Fishes (1935)
- The Science and Mystery of the Cat (1940)
- Twenty Little Fishes (1942)
- The Natural History of the Pig (1952)
