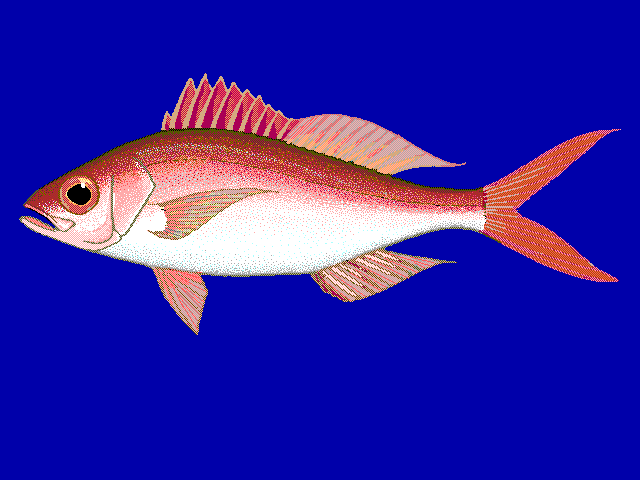

Conservation status
- Data Deficient (IUCN 3.1)

Scientific classification
- Kingdom: Animalia
- Phylum: Chordata
- Class: Actinopterygii
- Order: Acanthuriformes
- Family: Lutjanidae
- Genus: Etelis
- Species: E. oculatus

Binomial name
- Etelis oculatus (Valenciennes, 1828)

Synonyms
- Serranus oculatus Valenciennes, 1828; Erythrobussothen gracilis Parr, 1933

= Queen snapper =

Species of fish

The queen snapper (Etelis oculatus), also known as the night snapper or brim snapper, is a species of ray-finned fish, a snapper belonging to the family Lutjanidae. It is native to the western Atlantic Ocean, and is the only species in the genus Etelis found outside the Indo-Pacific region.

== Description ==
The queen snapper has an elongated, fusiform, slender body. It has a flat intraorbital area, large eyes and a short snout with the lower jaw slightly protruding. The jaws have bands of small conical teeth, the outer row consisting of larger teeth which are more widely spaced. There are 1-2 pairs of canine teeth in the front of the jaws. The vomerine teeth are arranged in a V-shaped patch, which is sometimes very triangular. The dorsal fin has 10 spines and 11 soft rays, while the anal fin contains 3 spines and 8 soft rays, the rearmost ray on each fin being the longest. The dorsal and anal fins are both scaleless. The caudal fin is deeply forked and its lobes lengthen as the fish grows. It has long pointed pectoral fins which contain 19 or 17 rays. The body is covered with medium-sized scales and the dorsal scale rows run parallel to the lateral line. The maximum recorded total length is 100 cm (39 in), although a total length of 67 cm (26 in) is more typical. This species has a reddish deep pink back and upper flanks fading towards the abdomen. The fins other than the spiny part of the dorsal, and the caudal fin which are brilliant red, are pink. The large eyes are yellow with a red iris.

== Distribution ==
The queen snapper is found in the warmer waters of the western Atlantic Ocean. Its range extends from North Carolina south along the Atlantic coast of the United States, through the Gulf of Mexico and the Caribbean Sea to South America as far south as São Paulo in Brazil. It is also found at Bermuda and at Brazil's Fernando de Noronha and Atol das Rocas Islands.

== Habitat and biology ==
The queen snapper is a bathydemersal species which is found at depths between 100 and 450 m (330 and 1,480 ft). Adults are found over rock substrates where they feed mainly on fish and squid. The juveniles are found in mid-water and will feed on crustaceans. Spawning takes place through most of the year, peaking towards the end of the year; spring seems to be when these fish are not reproductively active.

== Taxonomy ==
The queen snapper was first formally described in 1828 by the French zoologist Achille Valenciennes as Serranus oculatus with the type locality given as Martinique. The specific name oculatus means "eyed" and is based on the local name for this species on Martinique, gros-yeux which means "bigeyes".

== Fisheries ==
The queen snapper is a quarry for commercial fisheries throughout its range. They are caught using hand lines, longlines and traps. When they are brought to the surface they suffer from irreversible barotrauma, meaning that most cannot be returned. They are subjected to severe fishing pressure and it is almost certain that some populations are declining. The juveniles are taken as a by-catch by trawlers. This species is regarded as an excellent food fish and the fish caught are sold fresh and frozen.

In the waters off the south eastern United States the queen snapper is managed by the South Atlantic Fish Management Council. They apply a minimum size of 30 cm (12 in) total length and a catch limit of 10 snappers of any species for both commercial and recreational Allowable Catch Limits. The Gulf of Mexico Fish Management Council also includes this species within the 10 snapper per person aggregate limit in the U.S. Gulf of Mexico, but does not set a minimum size limit or a season.
