= Allobenedenia =

Scientific classification
- Kingdom: Animalia
- Phylum: Platyhelminthes
- Class: Monogenea
- Order: Capsalidea
- Family: Capsalidae
- Genus: Allobenedenia; Yamaguti, 1963

Synonyms
- Allosprostonia Lawler & Hargis, 1968; Megalocotyloides Bychowsky & Nagibina, 1967; Tetrasepta Suriano, 1975

Genus of flatworms

Allobenedenia is a genus of monopisthocotylean monogeneans, included in the family Capsalidae. All species in this genus are parasitic on external surfaces of marine teleosts.

According to Yang et al., (2004) species of Allobenedenia are characterised by a haptor with 5 radial loculi formed by 5 radial septa; the central loculus is usually absent.

== Species ==
These species are currently recognized in the genus:

- Allobenedenia convoluta (Yamaguti, 1937) Yamaguti, 1963
- Allobenedenia dischizosepta (Suriano, 1975) Bagnato, Bullard & Cremonte, 2017
- Allobenedenia epinepheli (Bychowsky& Nagibina, 1967)
- Allobenedenia patagonica (Evdokimova, 1969) Yang, Kritsky& Sun, 2004
- Allobenedenia pedunculata Raju & Rao, 1980
- Allobenedenia pseudomarginata (Bravo-Hollis, 1958) Yang, Kritsky& Sun, 2004
- Allobenedenia sebastodi (Egorova, 1994) Yang, Kritsky& Sun, 2004
- Allobenedenia yamagutii (Egorova, 1994) Yang, Kritsky& Sun, 2004
- Allobenedenia zhangi Yang, Kritsky& Sun, 2004
