= Etelis carbunculus =

Conservation status
- Least Concern (IUCN 3.1)

Scientific classification
- Kingdom: Animalia
- Phylum: Chordata
- Class: Actinopterygii
- Order: Acanthuriformes
- Family: Lutjanidae
- Genus: Etelis
- Species: E. carbunculus

Binomial name
- Etelis carbunculus Cuvier, 1828

Synonyms
- Eteliscus marshi Jenkins, 1903; Etelis marshi (Jenkins, 1903)

Species of fish

Etelis carbunculus, the deep-water red snapper, ruby snapper, longtail snapper, or ehu, is a species of ray-finned fish, a snapper belonging to the family Lutjanidae. It is found in the Indo-Pacific region.

== Description ==
Etelis carbunculus is an elongated fish with a small head and a large eye, the space between the eyes is flat. The mouth extends back as far as the middle of the eye and the jaws are each equipped with a single row of conical teeth with one or two pairs of enlarged canines at the front. The vomerine teeth are arranged in a slender V-shaped patch. The forked caudal fin has relatively short lobes in comparison to congeners. It has a continuous dorsal fin which has a deep notch at the junction of its spiny part and the ultimate soft ray of both the dorsal and anal fins extends beyond the membrane, being longer than the penultimate ray. The dorsal fin contains 10 spines and 11 soft rays while the anal fin has 3 spines and 8 soft rays, both fins lacking scales. The pectoral fins are long, almost equal to the head length. The maximum recorded fork length is 127 cm (50 in), although a total length of 65 cm (26 in) is more typical. The overall colour of this species is reddish to pinkish with a whitish abdomen. There are red margins to the dorsal fin and the caudal fin which has a white tip to its lower lobe.

== Distribution ==
Etelis carbunculus has a wide distribution and can be found throughout the Indian and Pacific Oceans. It occurs from the Red Sea south to Mozambique on the coast of East Africa to the Persian Gulf, across the Indian Ocean into the Pacific Ocean. In the Pacific its range extends north to Japan, south to Australia and east to Hawaii. It has also been found around Manawatāwhi / Three Kings Islands off northern New Zealand. In Australia it is found from Geraldton in Western Australia east into the Arafura Sea to the northeast of Darwin in the Northern Territory onto the outer Great Barrier Reef off Queensland, maybe also occurring farther south. It also occurs at Lord Howe Island in the Tasman Sea as well as at Christmas Island and Cocos (Keeling) Islands.

== Habitat and biology ==
Etelis carbunculus is found over rock substrates and rocky reefs at depths between 90 and 400 m (300 and 1,310 ft), in or around the benthos. It has been reported forming aggregations. It is a predatory species feeding on fishes, squid, crustaceans and zooplankton. They breed all year round in Vanuatu, spawning peaking there in November.

=== Parasites ===
The monopisthocotylean monogenean of the genus Lagenivaginopseudobenedenia are known to parasitise E. carbunculus. These parasites have what is possibly the longest valid generic name of the zoological nomenclature for a non-fossil organism.

== Taxonomy ==
Etelis carbunculus was first formally described in 1828 by the French zoologist Georges Cuvier with the type locality given as Mahé in the Seychelles. At the time it was the only species in the genus Etelis so it is the type species of that genus. The specific name carbunculus is a "ruby red precious stone", a reference to the reddish colour of this fish.

== Fisheries ==
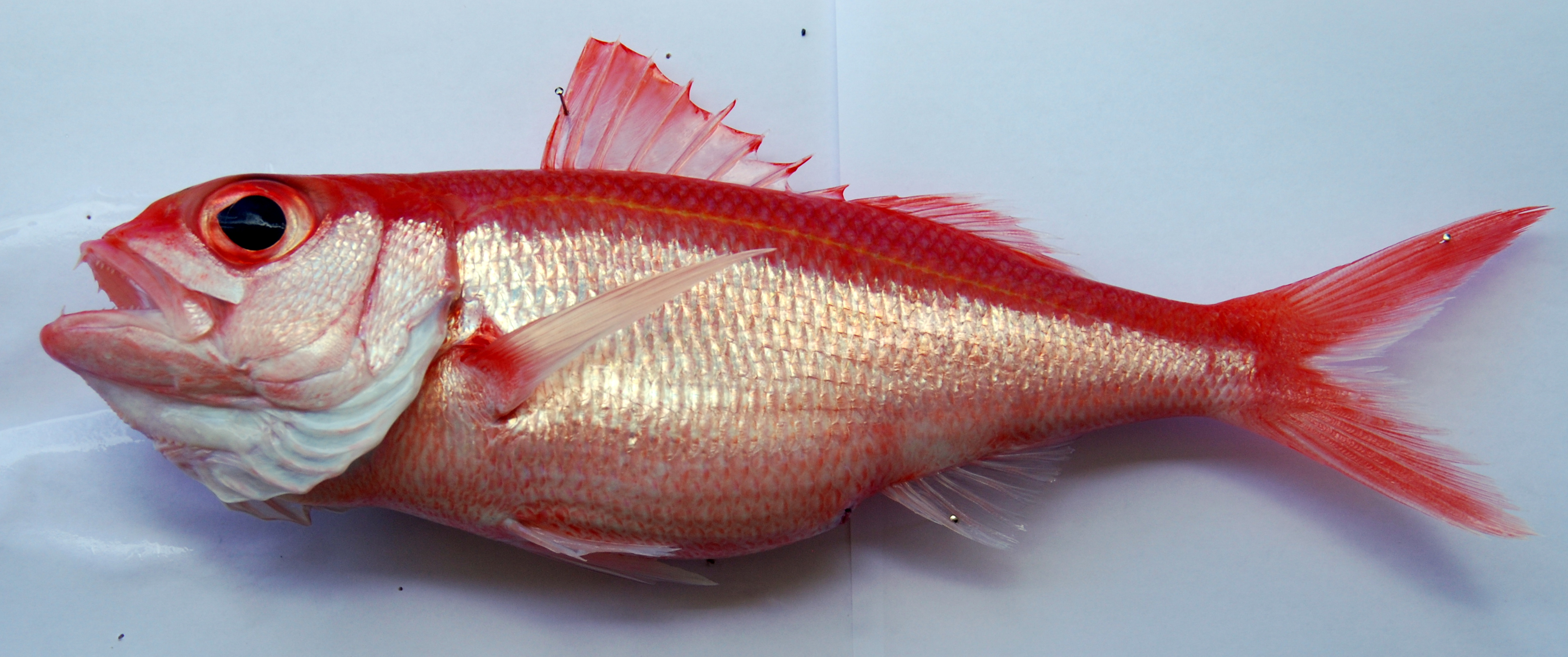
Etelis carbunculus collected near Nouméa, New Caledonia

Etelis carbunculus is a target for fisheries throughout its range and the stocks have been reported to be declining in some regions. It is caught using bottom longlines and deep handlines and is an important food fish. In Australia its stock is managed under the Western Deep Water Fishery. The caught fish are sold fresh or frozen.
