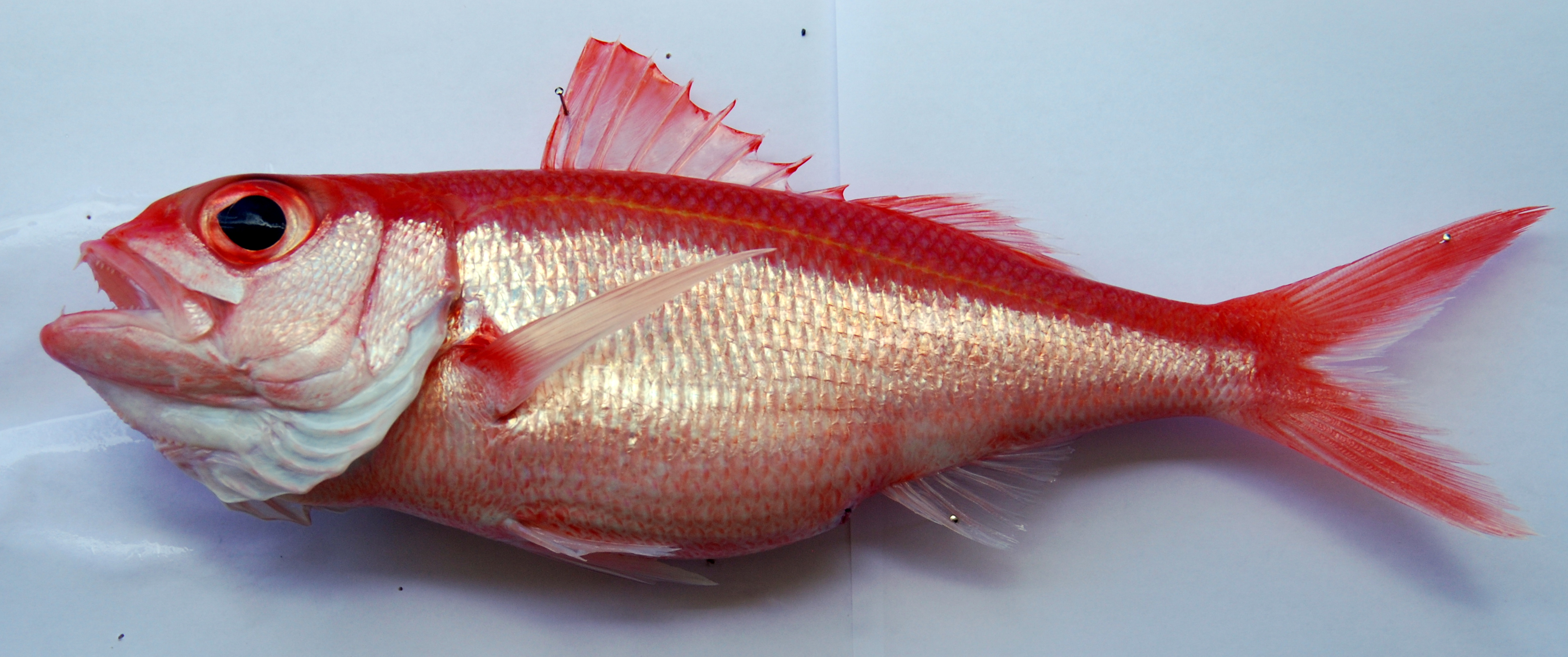
- Etelis carbunculus

Scientific classification
- Kingdom: Animalia
- Phylum: Chordata
- Class: Actinopterygii
- Order: Acanthuriformes
- Family: Lutjanidae
- Subfamily: Etelinae
- Genus: Etelis; G. Cuvier, 1828

Type species
- Etelis carbunculus G. Cuvier, 1828

Synonyms
- Elastoma Swainson, 1839; Hesperanthias R. T. Lowe, 1843; Macrops A. M. C. Duméril, 1856; Etelinus D. S. Jordan, 1911; Erythrobussothen A. E. Parr, 1933

= Etelis =

Etelis Temporal range: Late Miocene–present

Genus of fishes

Etelis is a genus of marine ray-finned fish belonging to the family Lutjanidae, the snappers. They are mostly native to the Indian and Pacific oceans with one species (E. oculatus) native to the western Atlantic Ocean.

== Taxonomy ==
Etelis was named by the French zoologist Georges Cuvier in 1830 with Etelis carbunculus as its only species and, therefore, its type species. The name of the genus was taken from Aristotle by Cuvier, who said that Aristotle had used it for a fish he did not give a description for.

The currently recognized species in this genus are:

- Etelis boweni Andrews, Fernandez-Silva, Randall & H.-C. Ho, 2021 (Bowen’s snapper)
- Etelis carbunculus G. Cuvier, 1828 (deep-water red snapper)
- Etelis coruscans Valenciennes, 1862 (deepwater longtail red snapper)
- Etelis oculatus (Valenciennes, 1828) (queen snapper)
- Etelis radiosus W. D. Anderson, 1981 (pale snapper)

A single fossil species, †Etelis bathypelagicus Aguilera et al., 2025, is known from a nearly complete fossil skeleton recovered from the Late Miocene-aged Chagres Formation from the Pacific coast of Panama. This species appears to have inhabited deep waters of the Central American Seaway just prior to its closure and the formation of the Isthmus of Panama.

== Characteristics ==
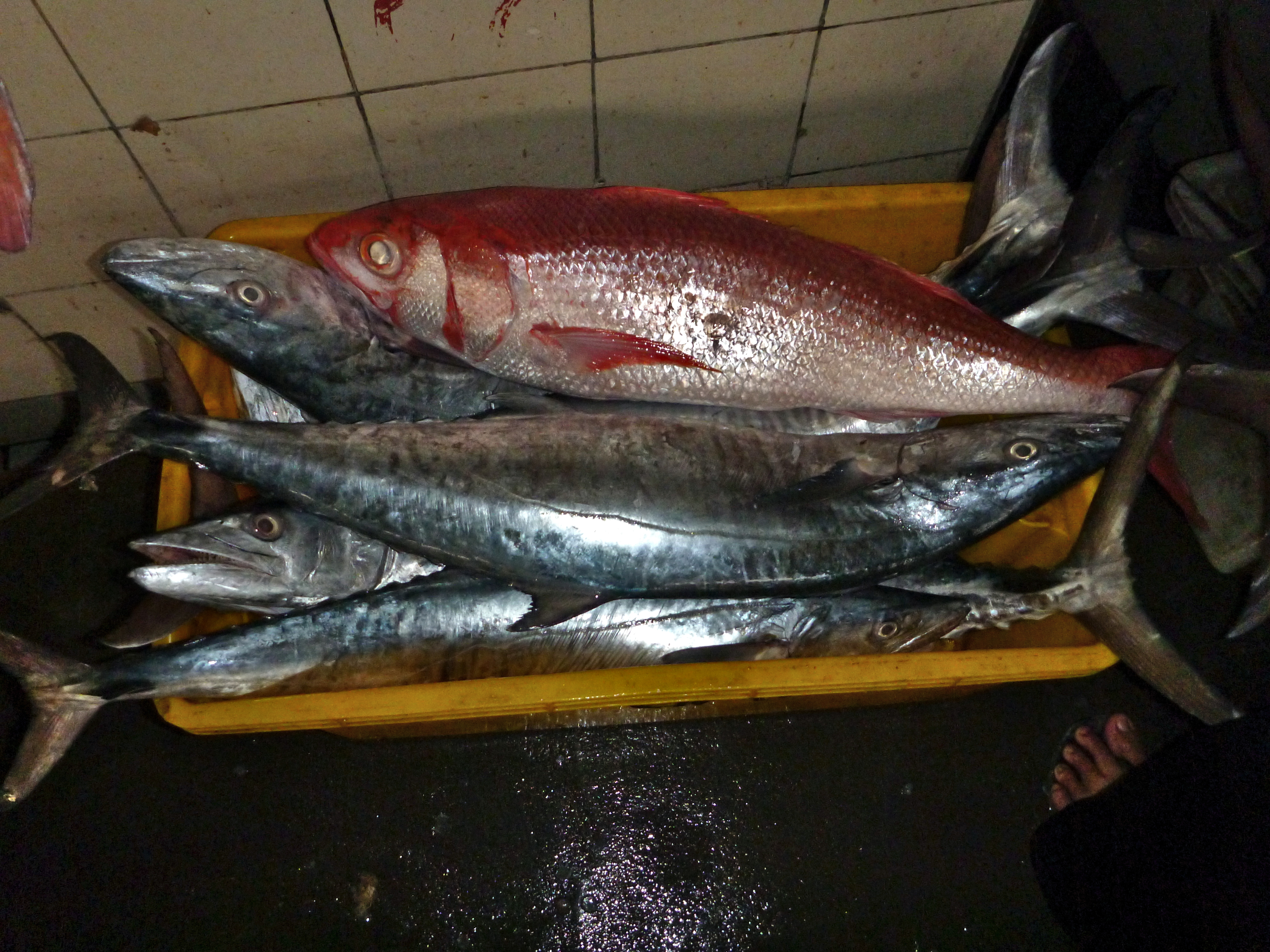
Etelis snapper with narrow-barred Spanish mackerel, in Malaysia

Etelis snappers are medium sized Lutjanids with slender, fusiform bodies. The jaws are equipped with small, conical teeth, the outer row being the largest and they have 1 or 2 pairs of enlarged canines at their front. The vomerine teeth are placed in a v-shaped or a crescent shaped patch. The space between the eyes is flattened. They have a continuous dorsal fin but there is a notch at the junction of the spiny part of the fin, this fin has 10 spines and 10 to 11 soft rays. The anal fin has 3 spines and 8 soft rays. Both the dorsal and anal fins lack scales and the last ray in each fin is elongated.compared to the neighbouring ray The pectoral fins are long, just shorter than the head and contain 15 to 17 rays. The caudal fins are forked. These snappers are coloured in a variety of red or pink shades changing to silvery or whitish on lower flanks and abdomen.

== Distribution ==
Etelis species are found mainly in the Indian Ocean and western Pacific Ocean, with one species the queen snapper (E. oculatus) being found in the tropical western Atlantic Ocean.

== Habitat and biology ==
Etelis snappers are found at moderate depths, between 90 and 450 m (300 and 1,480 ft), over rock substrates. They may be solitary or found in small groups. Their diet includes fishes, squid and crustaceans.

== Fisheries ==
Etelis species are important in many areas as food fish, especially among the archipelagos of the Indian and West Pacific Oceans. These fish are fished for mainly using bottom longlines and deep handlines. They are considered to be good quality food fish and the catch is mainly sold fresh.
