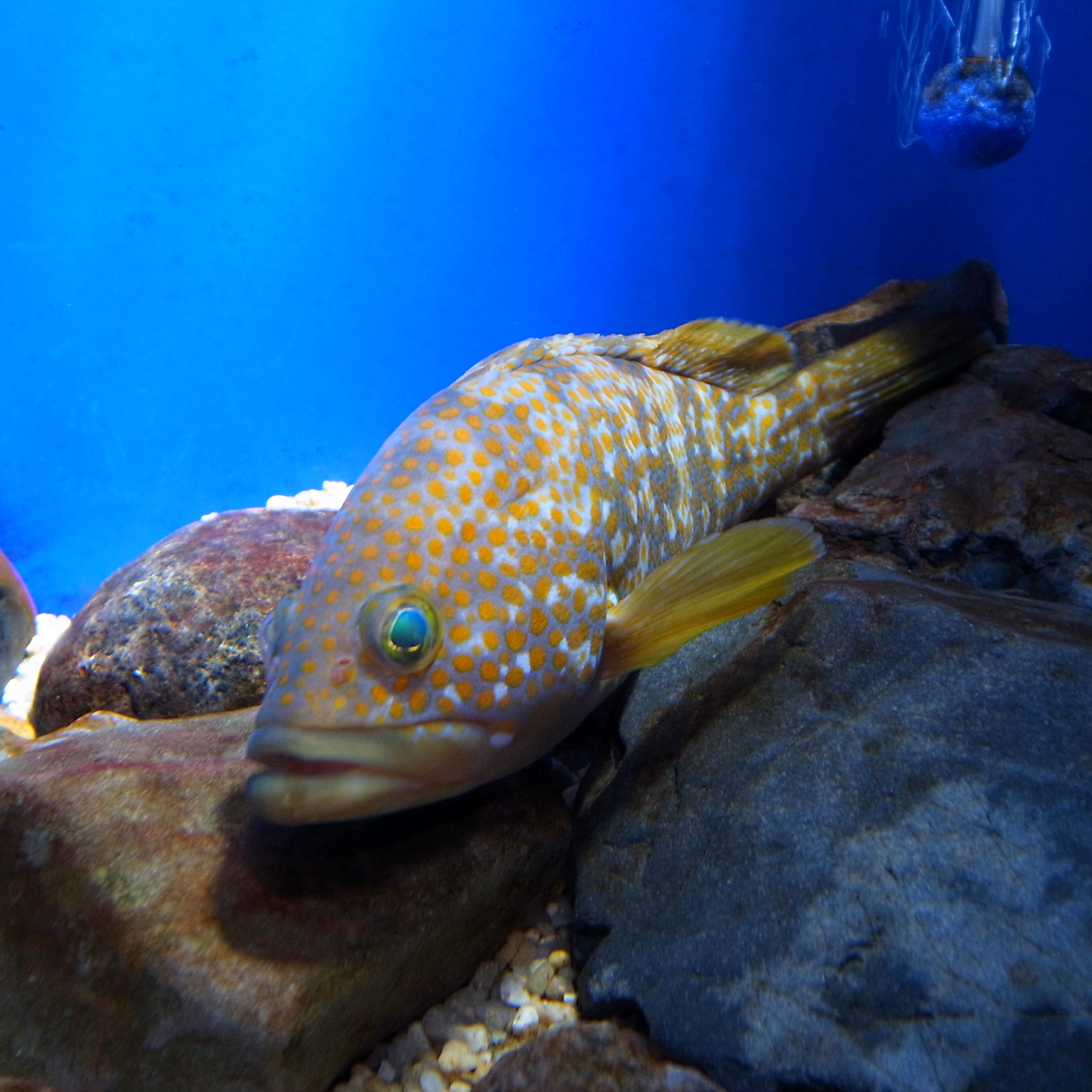

Conservation status
- Endangered (IUCN 3.1)

Scientific classification
- Kingdom: Animalia
- Phylum: Chordata
- Class: Actinopterygii
- Order: Perciformes
- Suborder: Percoidei
- Family: Epinephelidae
- Genus: Epinephelus
- Species: E. akaara

Binomial name
- Epinephelus akaara (Temminck & Schlegel, 1842)

Synonyms
- Serranus akaara Temminck & Schlegel, 1842; Serranus shihpan Richardson, 1846; Serranus variegatus Richardson, 1846; Epinephelus ionthas Jordan & Metz, 1913; Epinephelus lobotoides Nichols, 1913

= Hong Kong grouper =

Species of fish

The Hong Kong grouper (Epinephelus akaara), also known as bukbari, is a species of marine ray-finned fish, a grouper from the subfamily Epinephelinae which is part of the family Serranidae, which also includes the anthias and sea basses. It is found in eastern and southeastern Asian waters of the Western Pacific Ocean. Its natural habitats are shallow seas and coral reefs.

== Description ==
The Hong Kong grouper has a body which has a standard length which is around 2.7-3.2 times the depth of its body. The dorsal profile of the head is convex between the eyes. The preopercle is rounded and serrated with the serrations at its angle enlarged. The dorsal fin contains 11 spines and 15-17 soft rays while the anal fin has 3 spines and 8 soft rays. The caudal fin is rounded and the pelvic fin does not extend as far as the anus. There are 61-64 scales in the lateral line. The head and body have a pale brownish grey background colour, with the flanks and back covered with small red, orange or gold spots. There are 6 indistinct diagonal dark bars which can normally be seen on at least towards the back. The first bar is on the nape, the third bar runs through a dark brown or black blotch on the body at base of rearmost 3 spines of the dorsal fin while the final bar is on the caudal peduncle. These dark bars reach the base of dorsal fin. The margin of the dorsal fin is yellow or orange with a line of dusky yellow or orange spots along middle of spiny part of that dorsal fin and another along base of the fin. These rows have one spot on each membrane. The soft part of the dorsal fin as well as the caudal and anal fins have indistinct red or orange spots at their bases and dusky membranes faintly marked with small white spots. The maximum published total length for this species is 58 centimetres (23 in), although they are more common at around 30 centimetres (12 in), and the maximum published weight is 2.5 kilograms (5.5 lb).

== Distribution ==
The Hong Kong grouper is found in the Western Pacific Ocean. It is found in southern Japan where it occurs in the Tsugaru Strait, the strait between Honshu and Hokkaido south along both coasts. It is also found off Korea, China and Taiwan as far as the Gulf of Tonkin. It may be found off Vietnam but this needs to be confirmed as the lone reported specimen may be a misidentification of Epinephelus fasciatomaculosus. There are unsubstantiated records from India and the Philippines.

== Habitat and biology ==
The Hong Kong grouper is found in coral and rocky reefs down to depths of at least 55 metres (180 ft) while juveniles prefer shallower waters than the adults. Around Japan he species is common in rocky areas. Fishermen in Hong Kong report taking this species as spawning adults along the continental shelf in the East China Sea and South China Sea at depths of 27 to 55 metres (89 to 180 ft). Around the Byeonsan Peninsula of the Republic of Korea spawning has been observed in late July and early August. In this area hermaphrodites had a length of measured around 28 to 32 centimetres (11 to 13 in) while males were 40 centimetres (16 in). Spawning aggregations have not been confirmed in this species although there are anecdotal reports from Hong Kong of divers encountering groups of up to 50 fishes in close proximity on reefs in the summer, coinciding with the known spawning season.

As other fish, the Hong Kong grouper harbours parasites, including, among others, the diplectanid monogenean Pseudorhabdosynochus satyui and Pseudorhabdosynochus epinepheli, parasitic on the gills.

== Taxonomy ==
The Hong Kong grouper was first formally described as Serranus akaara in 1842 by the Dutch zoologist Coenraad Jacob Temminck (1778-1858) and his student, the German ichthyologist Hermann Schlegel (1804-1884), with the type locality given as Nagasaki.

== Utlisation ==
The Hong Kong grouper is regarded as a species of high commercial value in Hong Kong and Japan. It is usually caught by hand-line over rock strata and the species is often marketed live to increase the price paid. It has been bred in aquaculture but the survival of the hatched larvae is low. By the mid-1990s the wild population was exhausted as a viable fishery.

== Conservation ==
The Hong Kong grouper has no effectively managed stocks. In China there are limits on the gear which can be used but in Hong Kong the fishing is largely unregulated, except a small no take zone where the species may actually be increasing. Hatchery reared larvae are released in Japanese waters but there are no known conservation measures in other parts of its range.
