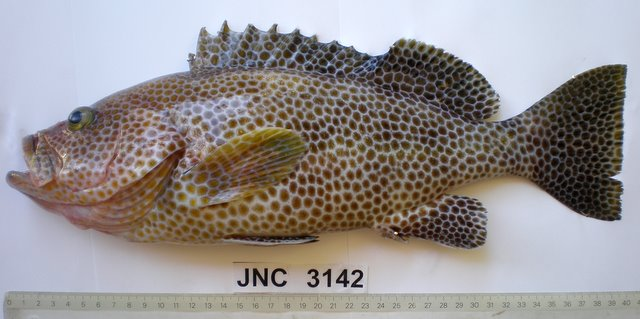
- Epinephelus chlorostigma from New Caledonia

Conservation status
- Least Concern (IUCN 3.1)

Scientific classification
- Kingdom: Animalia
- Phylum: Chordata
- Class: Actinopterygii
- Division: Teleostei
- Order: Perciformes
- Suborder: Percoidei
- Family: Epinephelidae
- Genus: Epinephelus
- Species: E. chlorostigma

Binomial name
- Epinephelus chlorostigma (Valenciennes, 1828)

Synonyms
- Serranus chlorostigma Valenciennes, 1828; Serranus areolatus japonicus Temminck & Schlegel, 1842; Serranus reevesii Richardson, 1846; Serranus celebicus multipunctatus Kossmann & Räuber, 1877; Serranus assabensis Giglioli, 1889

= Brownspotted grouper =

Species of fish

The brownspotted grouper (Epinephelus chlorostigma), also known as the brown spotted reef cod, brown-spotted rockcod, coral grouper or honeycomb cod, is a species of marine ray-finned fish, a grouper from the subfamily Epinephelinae which is part of the family Serranidae, which also includes the anthias and sea basses. It has an Indo-Pacific distribution but in the northern Indian Ocean this distribution is discontinuous. It forms part of a species complex with two closely related species in the genus Epinephelus.

== Description ==
The brownspotted grouper has a body with a standard length which is 2.8 to 3.3 times its depth. The preopercle is slightly angular and has 4 to 7 enlarged serrations at the angle. The upper margin of the gill cover is straight. The dorsal fin has 11 spines and 16-18 soft rays while the anal fin contains 3 spines and 8 soft rays. The caudal fin varies from truncate to slightly emarginate. The pelvic fins are slightly shorter than the pectoral fins. The lateral line has 48-53 scales. This is a pale species of grouper which is covered in a dense pattern of small brown spots apart from the lower part of the head, chest and lower abdomen which lack spotting. They can sometimes temporarily show large dark spots which overlay the normal body pattern. The maximum recorded total length attained is 80 centimetres (31 in), although a more common length is 50 centimetres (20 in), and the maximum published weight is 7 kilograms (15 lb).

== Distribution ==
The brownspotted grouper has an Indo-Pacific range which extends from the Red Sea and the eastern coast of Africa, as far south as KwaZulu-Natal in South Africa, to the Western Pacific Ocean where it extends north to southern Japan south to New Caledonia and east to American Samoa and Fiji. There are gaps in this distribution and there are no confirmed records from the Comoros, the continental shelf between Oman and Cambodia, the East Indies, Taiwan and mainland Australia. The claims of this species from the Persian Gulf are considered to be misidentifications of Epinephelus polylepis. In Australia this species is found only around offshore reefs off north western Australia in Western Australia and the Northern Territory.

== Habitat and biology ==
The brownspotted grouper occurs over a wide range of habitats such as seagrass beds and outer reef slopes, as well as over mud bottoms. It is a solitary species which is a predator on small fishes and crustaceans, mainly stomatopods and crabs. This species is a protogynous hermaphrodite and the change in sex from female to male takes place between 35–45 centimetres (14–18 in), although not all of the females undergo this change. The adults form spawning aggregations.

== Parasites ==
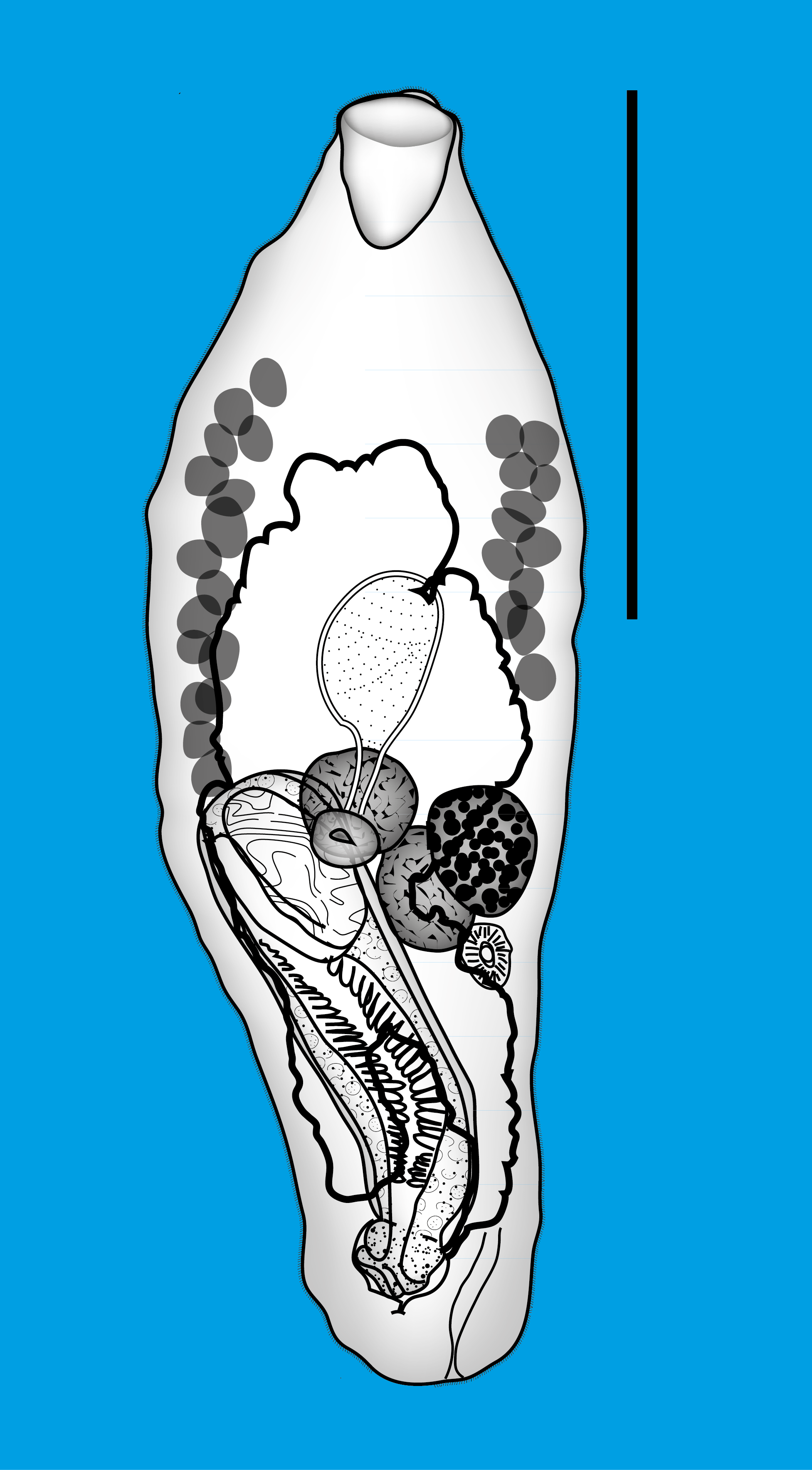
Neidhartia lochepintade Bray & Justine, 2013, an intestinal parasite of Epinephelus chlorostigma

As other fish, the Epinephelus cholorostigme has many parasites, including nematodes in its intestine, such as Cucullanus epinepheli, and several species of monogeneans on its gills, including Pseudorhabdosynochus cyanopodus, Pseudorhabdosynochus epinepheli, Pseudorhabdosynochus podocyanus, Pseudorhabdosynochus stigmosus, Pseudorhabdosynochus exoticoides and the digenean Neidhartia lochepintade in its intestine. This parasite species was named for the New Caledonian name of the fish, "loche pintade".

== Taxonomy ==
The brownspotted grouper was first formally described as Serranus chlorostigma in 1828 by the French zoologist Achille Valenciennes (1794-1865) with the type locality given as the Seychelles. E. chlorostigma is a member of a species complex comprising three species which are characterised by having a truncate or emarginate caudal fin, a body covered in dense spotting apart from their underparts, a slightly angular preopercle with slightly enlarged serrations at the angle, a straight upper edge to the gill cover and a similar count of gill rakers. The three species are E. chlorostigma, E. gabriellae and E. polylepsis. The fish in the Red Sea, northwestern Indian Ocean and the Gulf of Aden are now recognized as a valid species, Epinephelus geoffroyi.

== Utilisation ==
The brownspotted grouper is targeted by fisheries throughout its distribution.
