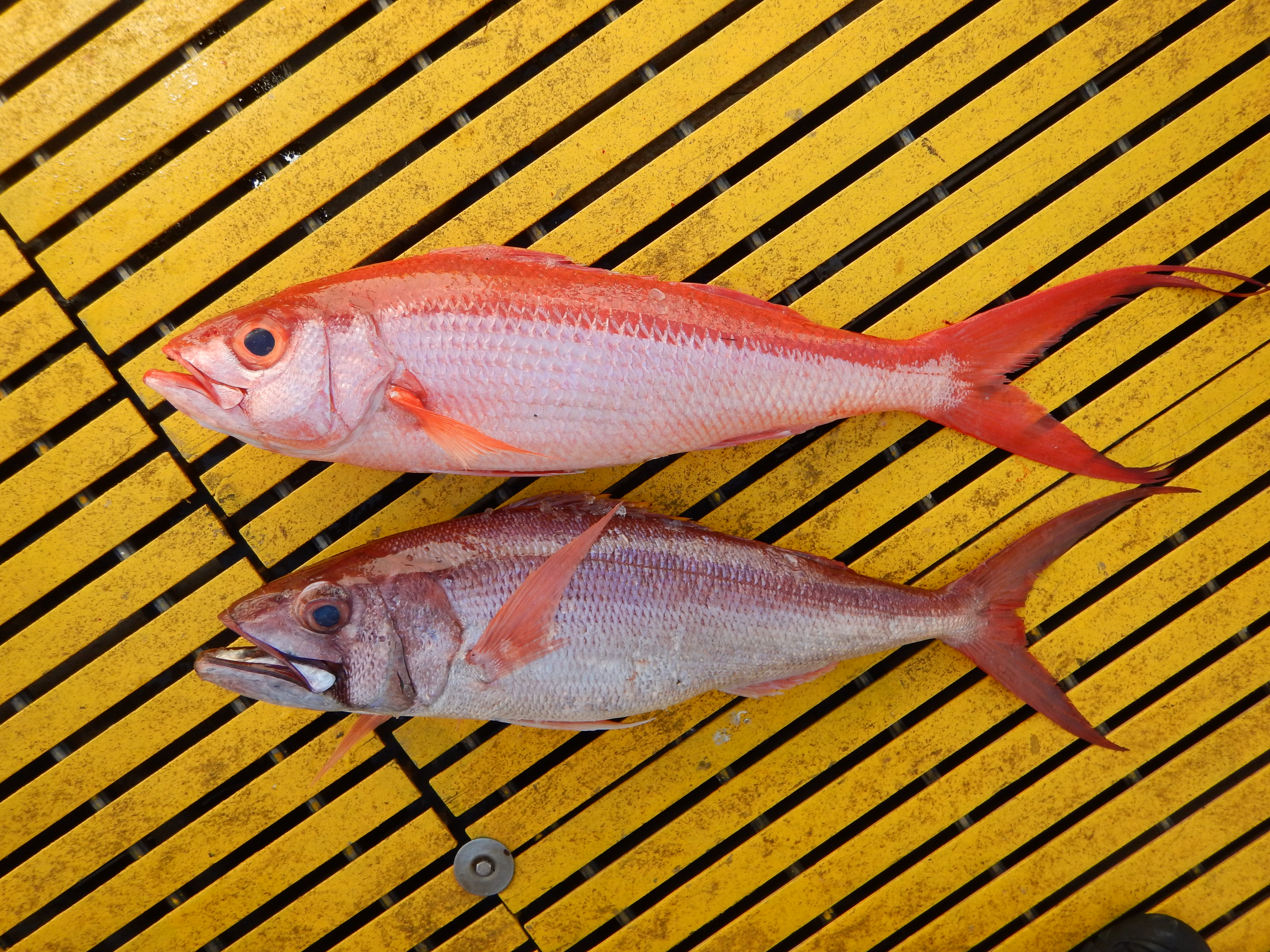
- Etelis coruscans (top); Aphareus rutilans (Bottom)

Conservation status
- Least Concern (IUCN 3.1)

Scientific classification
- Kingdom: Animalia
- Phylum: Chordata
- Class: Actinopterygii
- Order: Acanthuriformes
- Family: Lutjanidae
- Genus: Etelis
- Species: E. coruscans

Binomial name
- Etelis coruscans Valenciennes, 1862

= Etelis coruscans =

Species of ray-finned fish

Etelis coruscans is a species of snapper found in the Pacific and Indian oceans. It has many common names, including deepwater longtail red snapper, longtail snapper, and deep-water red snapper. It is a valuable commercial species, and lives quite deep – typically from 90 to 400 m (300 to 1,310 ft), (210 to 300 m (690 to 980 ft) in Hawaiʻi). It is a long-lived species that grows and matures slowly. In Hawaiʻi the fish is widely known as onaga. When eaten, it has a mild flavour and pale pink flesh.
