= New York Aquarium =

Aquarium in Brooklyn, New York

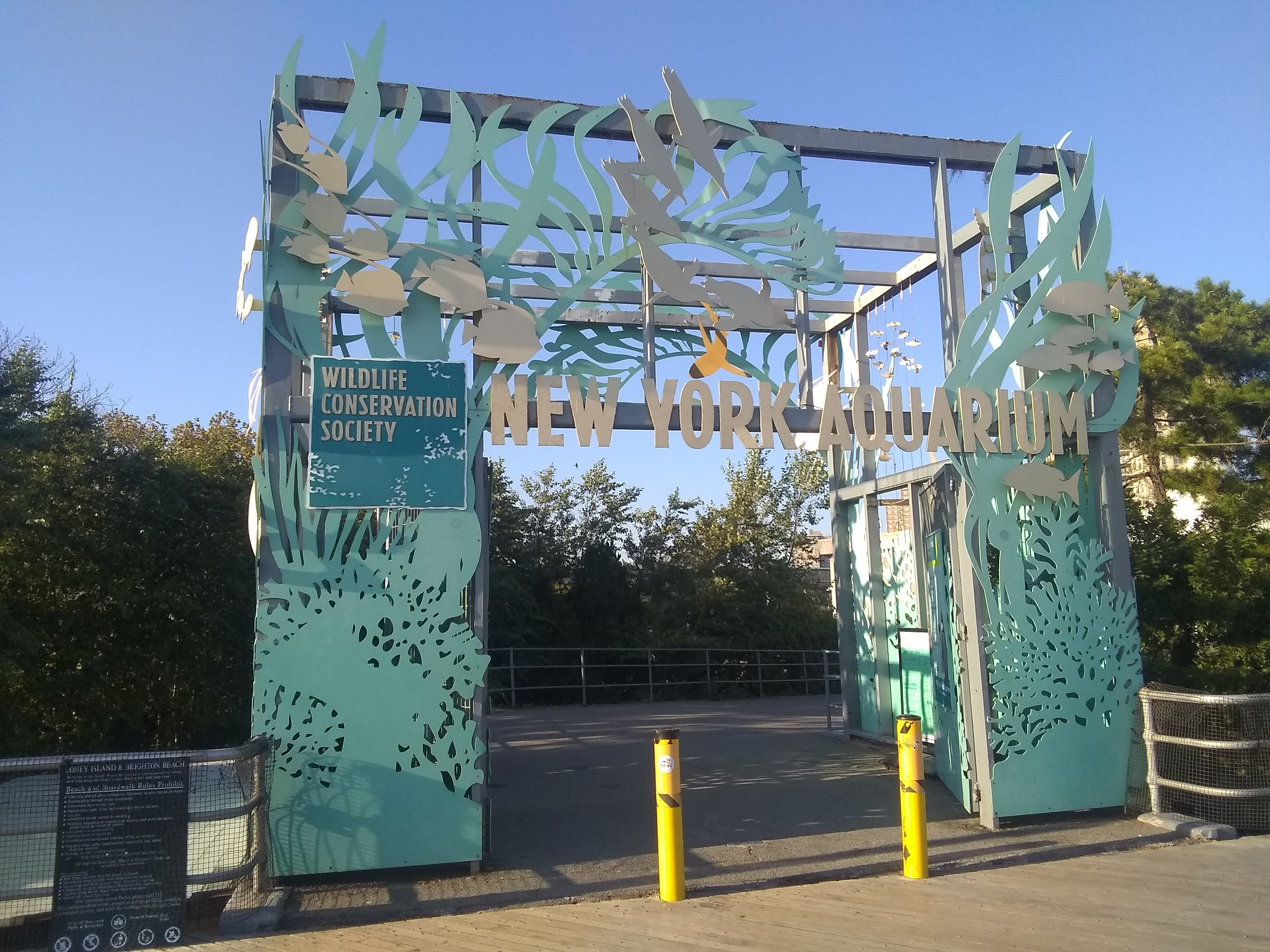
- Entrance to the aquarium.
- Interactive map of New York Aquarium
- 40°34′27″N 73°58′30″W
- Date opened: December 10, 1896
- Location: 602 Surf Avenue; Brooklyn, New York 11224; United States
- Land area: 14 acres (5.7 ha)
- Memberships: AZA
- Public transit: Subway: at West Eighth Street–New York Aquarium; Bus: B36
- Website: nyaquarium.com

The New York Aquarium is the oldest continually operating aquarium in the United States, located on the Riegelmann Boardwalk in Coney Island, Brooklyn, New York City. It was founded at Castle Garden in Battery Park, Manhattan, in 1896, and moved to Coney Island in 1957. The aquarium is operated by the Wildlife Conservation Society (WCS) as part of its integrated system of four zoos and one aquarium, most notably the Bronx Zoo. It is accredited by the Association of Zoos and Aquariums (AZA). As part of WCS, the aquarium's mission is to save wildlife and wild places worldwide through science, conservation action, education, and inspiring people to value nature.

The facility occupies 14 acres (5.7 ha) and boasts 266 species of aquatic wildlife. Its mission is to raise public awareness about issues facing the ocean and its inhabitants with special exhibits, public events and research. The New York Seascape program, based out of the aquarium, is WCS's local conservation program designed to restore healthy populations of marine species and protect New York waters, which are vital to the area's economic and cultural vitality.

== History ==
=== Battery Park location ===
==== Construction and early years ====
The New York City government had proposed converting Castle Garden, a former military fort and immigrant-processing station in Battery Park, into an aquarium in 1891. The following February, the New York State Legislature passed a bill allowing the city government to create an aquarium within Castle Garden. Julius F. Munckwitz Jr. drew up preliminary plans for an aquarium, which he presented to New York City's board of park commissioners in mid-1892. The state government voted to allocate $150,000 for the construction of an aquarium within Castle Garden. Local media reported in September 1896 that the aquarium was largely completed. At the time, the tanks contained 45 species, some of which had been in the aquarium for two years. Ultimately, it cost $175,000 to renovate Castle Garden into an aquarium.

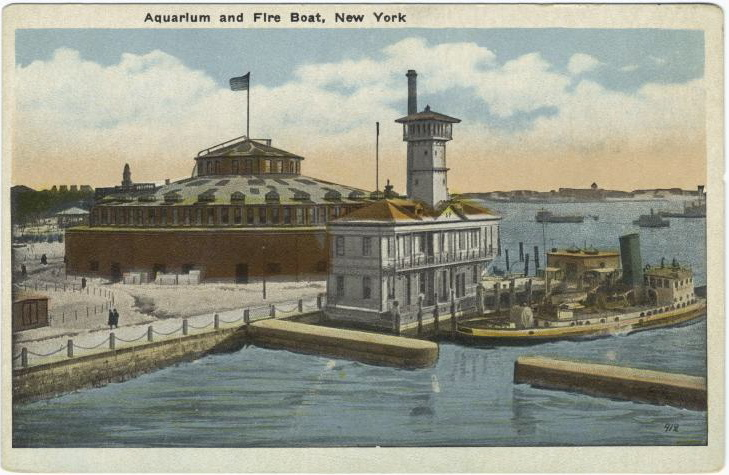
The aquarium used to be housed in Castle Clinton (left) in Battery Park (image before 1923).

The aquarium opened on December 10, 1896, following a soft opening the previous day. The aquarium attracted thousands of visitors on its opening day, and it averaged over 10,000 visitors per day during its first several months. Visitors were not charged admission, which may have contributed to the aquarium's popularity. The aquarium had two million guests within a year, and it had 5.5 million total guests by May 1900. In its early years, the New York Aquarium at Castle Garden typically had more visitors during the summer, and Sunday was the busiest day of the week. The aquarium's busiest day during this period was August 20, 1898, when over 47,000 people visited the aquarium.

The aquarium's first director was Tarleton Hoffman Bean, who was appointed in 1895. He was instrumental in helping to create similar wildlife organizations, especially aquaria. Bean was forced to resign in April 1898.

==== 1900s and 1910s ====
Interior of the Aquarium, NY City in 1905

In March 1902, New York state legislators proposed transferring operation of the New York Aquarium to the New York Zoological Society. The Board of Estimate authorized mayor Seth Low to lease the aquarium to the Zoological Society in July 1902, and the Zoological Society took over on October 31, 1902, with Charles Haskins Townsend as the aquarium's director. At the time, the Aquarium housed only 150 specimens of wildlife. Townsend enlarged the collections considerably, and the Aquarium attracted hundreds of thousands of visitors each year. Townsend served as the Aquarium's director for thirty years. After being appointed as director, Townsend soon made several modifications to Castle Garden's facilities, which cost over $30,000. The number of specimens at Castle Garden also increased; by 1903, the aquarium had 2,000 specimens from over 200 species. By 1907, the aquarium had over two million annual visitors, or an average of 6,000 per day.

By January 1911, officials instead planned to expand Castle Garden, adding semicircular wings to the west and east for over $1 million. Each wing was to contain three tiers of tanks and classroom space. The Zoological Society asked the Board of Estimate to allocate $1.75 million to the renovation, but the board still had not funded the renovation of Castle Garden by 1916. Townsend said the aquarium's mechanical facilities needed major upgrades.

==== 1920s to 1940s ====
In 1921, Townsend announced that the Zoological Society would construct an electric plant in the basement, replacing a steam plant on the south side of the aquarium building, and then install two tanks in the space formerly occupied by the steam plant. This work was funded by a bequest from Mrs. Russell Sage. By early 1923, the Zoological Society was carrying out the renovations at a cost of $86,000. In June 1923, the board voted to give $76,500 for the construction of an additional story above the building. The Zoological Society planned to add deeper tanks on the second floor, expanding exhibition space by 20 percent. By then, the aquarium had two million annual visitors. The expansion was largely completed by early 1924.

Townsend announced in 1926 that Castle Garden would undergo further modifications at a cost of $225,000. The plans included constructing a third story for workrooms and laboratory space, installing tanks behind the building, adding a new mechanical plant in the basement, and covering the facade with a gray cement finish. The Castle Garden Aquarium remained popular in the 1930s, with two million visitors per year, including 50,000 on a single day in 1934, a new record for the aquarium. Two laboratories were built on the structure's third story in 1940, and a new metal dome was installed above the building the same year. By then, the aquarium's acting director Charles M. Breder Jr. wished to develop a new building nearby, as he believed the aquarium had outgrown Castle Garden.

In February 1941, Triborough Bridge and Tunnel Authority Commissioner Robert Moses announced that he would demolish Castle Garden when the park was rebuilt during the Brooklyn–Battery Tunnel's construction. The city government closed the New York Aquarium and moved some fish and turtles to other aquariums in late 1941. Other fish remained on view at the Bronx zoo, while some species were released into the Atlantic Ocean.

=== Brooklyn location ===
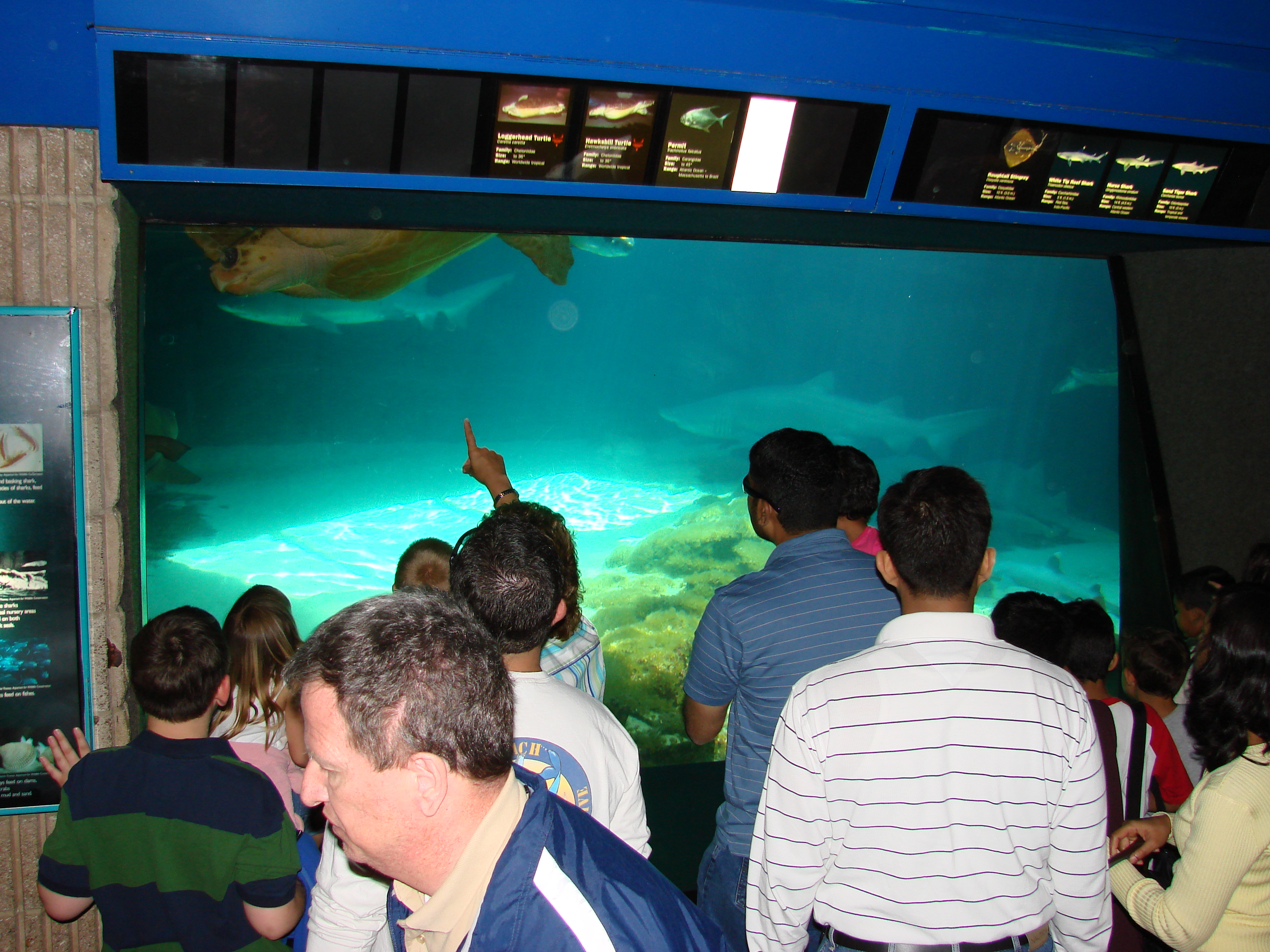
One of the aquariums in a exhibit.

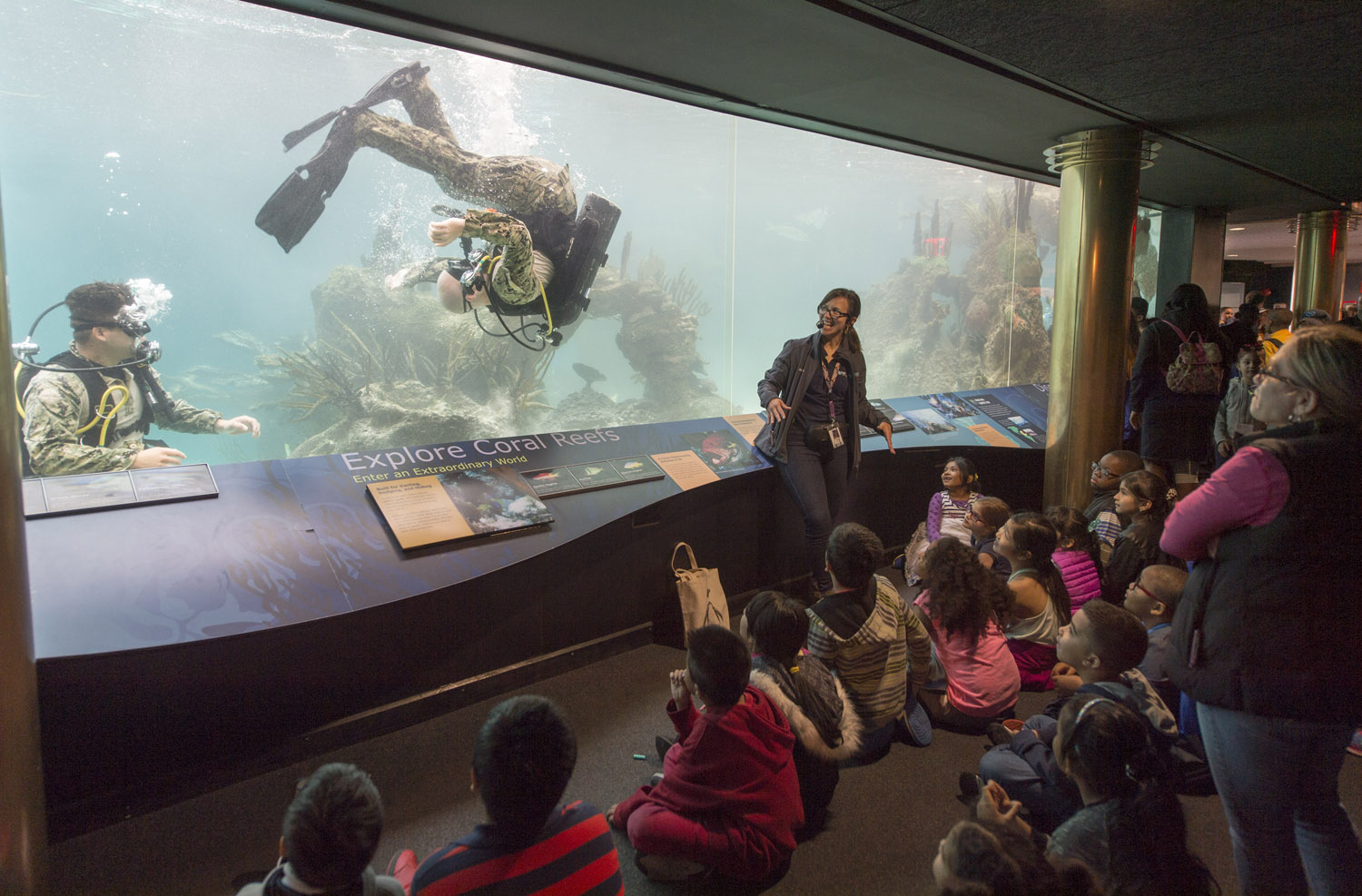
At the exhibit highlighting coral reefs.

In 1953, officials approved the construction of a new aquarium building in the Coney Island neighborhood of southern Brooklyn. The development of the new aquarium was expected to revitalize Coney Island. The New York City Planning Commission allocated 5 acres (2.0 ha) of parkland to the new aquarium, and construction commenced on October 24, 1954. Harrison & Abramovitz designed the aquarium at Coney Island. The first phase of the aquarium was originally projected to be completed in 1956 at a cost of $1.5 million; it was to be part of a larger, $10 million development. The project's completion date was delayed due to a shortage of construction materials. On June 6, 1957, the Aquarium opened in Coney Island. The aquarium charged admission at its Coney Island location; this was unpopular among members of the public, who had been accustomed to the free admission at Castle Garden.

When the Coney Island location opened, the WCS had to acquire nearly all its species from scratch, as the species at Castle Garden had been released into the ocean or given to other zoos. Among the few specimens transferred from Castle Garden were a pair of Ridley sea turtles that had been kept in Bermuda after the Castle Garden location closed. The Coney Island site of the New York Aquarium is the home of the WCS New York Seascape program – the society's research and conservation program focusing on nearby rivers, harbor, and ocean from Cape May, New Jersey, to Montauk, Long Island. The aquarium kept an orca briefly in 1968 and a narwhal in 1969. Both reportedly died of possible pneumonia. The aquarium's beluga whales were transferred to the Georgia Aquarium in 2007 as part of a breeding program. In September 2011, the aquarium named its new electric eel Wattson, and in March 2012, it launched a sea horse breeding program.

In October 2006, the New York Aquarium announced the finalists to a competition to develop a more inviting and visually prominent exterior for the aquarium. In March 2007, the winning design by firms WRT and Cloud 9 was selected, which featured an enclosure resembling a whale over the aquarium. However, in March 2008, that concept was scrapped due to concerns over the cost of the design and the practicality of constructing future exhibits under the enclosure. Instead, plans for a new exhibit based on sharks were announced. The massive 784,000-US-gallon (2,970,000 L), 57,000-square-foot (5,300 m^{2}) exhibition, Ocean Wonders: Sharks!, was originally scheduled to break ground in November 2012 and open in 2015. However, the New York Aquarium was significantly damaged by Hurricane Sandy in October 2012, which severely flooded the facility and shut down power. A small group of WCS staff who remained onsite during the hurricane were able to save 80 percent of the animals in the collection. As a result, construction on the exhibit was delayed. Ocean Wonders: Sharks! ultimately broke ground in January 2014. The exhibit opened on June 30, 2018, becoming the first major exhibit at the New York Aquarium to open after Hurricane Sandy.

The aquarium closed for four months starting in March 2020 due to the COVID-19 pandemic in New York City, which shuttered almost all businesses citywide. With the reopening of the aquarium in July 2020, a new exhibit called Spineless, dedicated to invertebrate marine species, was opened. The aquarium fully re-opened from Sandy damage in July 2022.

== Exhibits ==
As of 2018, the New York Aquarium consists of five exhibits: Aquatheater; Conservation Hall; Sea Cliffs; Spineless; and Ocean Wonders: Sharks.

The original Bathysphere, a deep-sea submersible that made historic journeys underwater in the 1930s, is on display at the aquarium.

== Notable people ==
- Charles Haskins Townsend served as director from 1902 to 1937.
- Ida May Mellen worked at the New York Aquarium from 1916 to 1929.
- James Arthur Oliver was director from 1970 until 1976. Oliver also held directorships at the Bronx Zoo and the American Museum of Natural History during his career - the only person to have been director of all three institutions.
