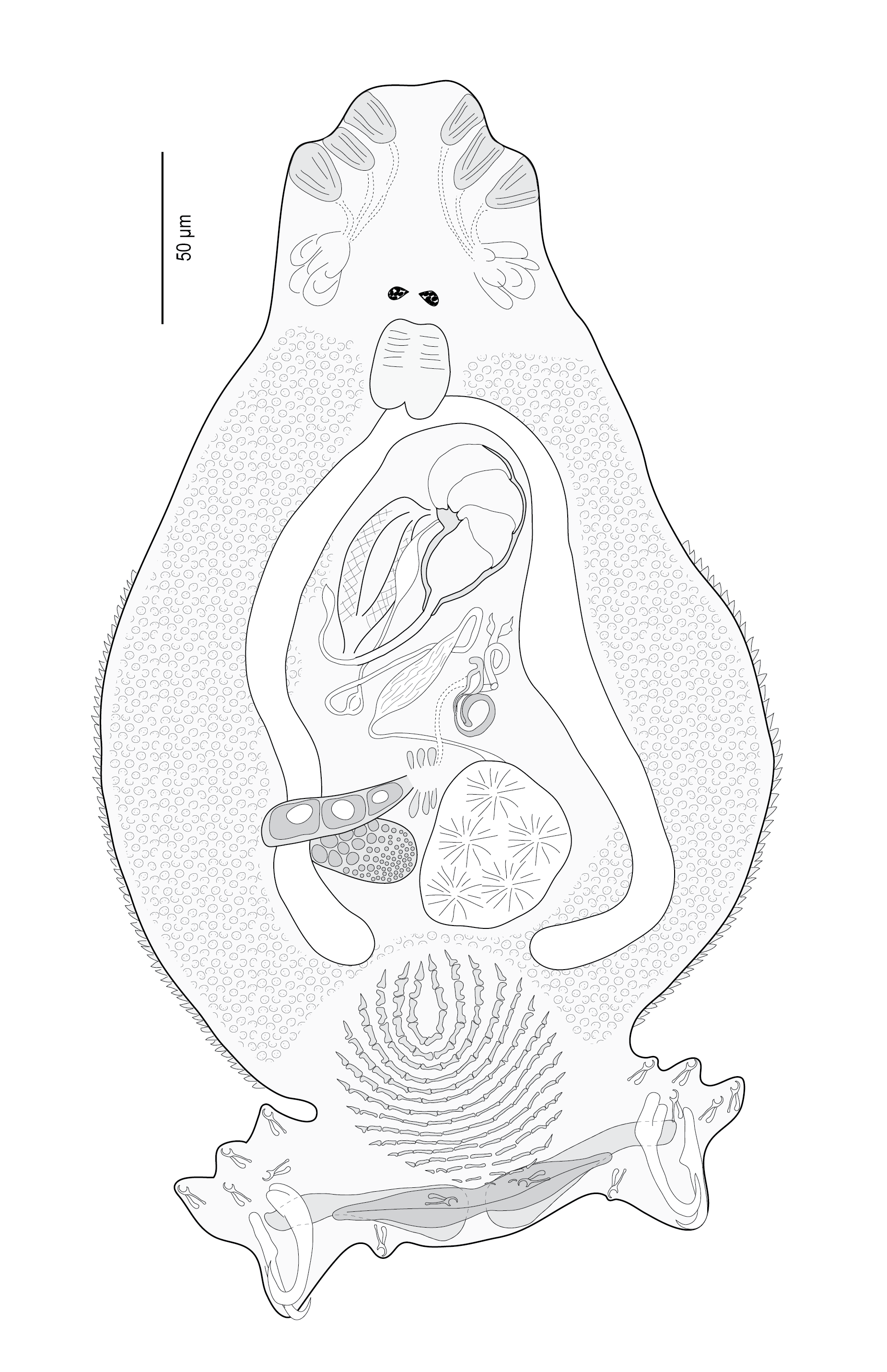
- Pseudorhabdosynochus epinepheli

Scientific classification
- Kingdom: Animalia
- Phylum: Platyhelminthes
- Class: Monogenea
- Order: Dactylogyridea
- Family: Diplectanidae
- Genus: Pseudorhabdosynochus
- Species: P. epinepheli

Binomial name
- Pseudorhabdosynochus epinepheli (Yamaguti, 1938) Kritsky & Beverley-Burton, 1986

= Pseudorhabdosynochus epinepheli =

Species of flatworm

Pseudorhabdosynochus epinepheli is a diplectanid monogenean parasitic on the gills of species of groupers. It is the type species of the genus Pseudorhabdosynochus Yamaguti, 1958.

== Description ==
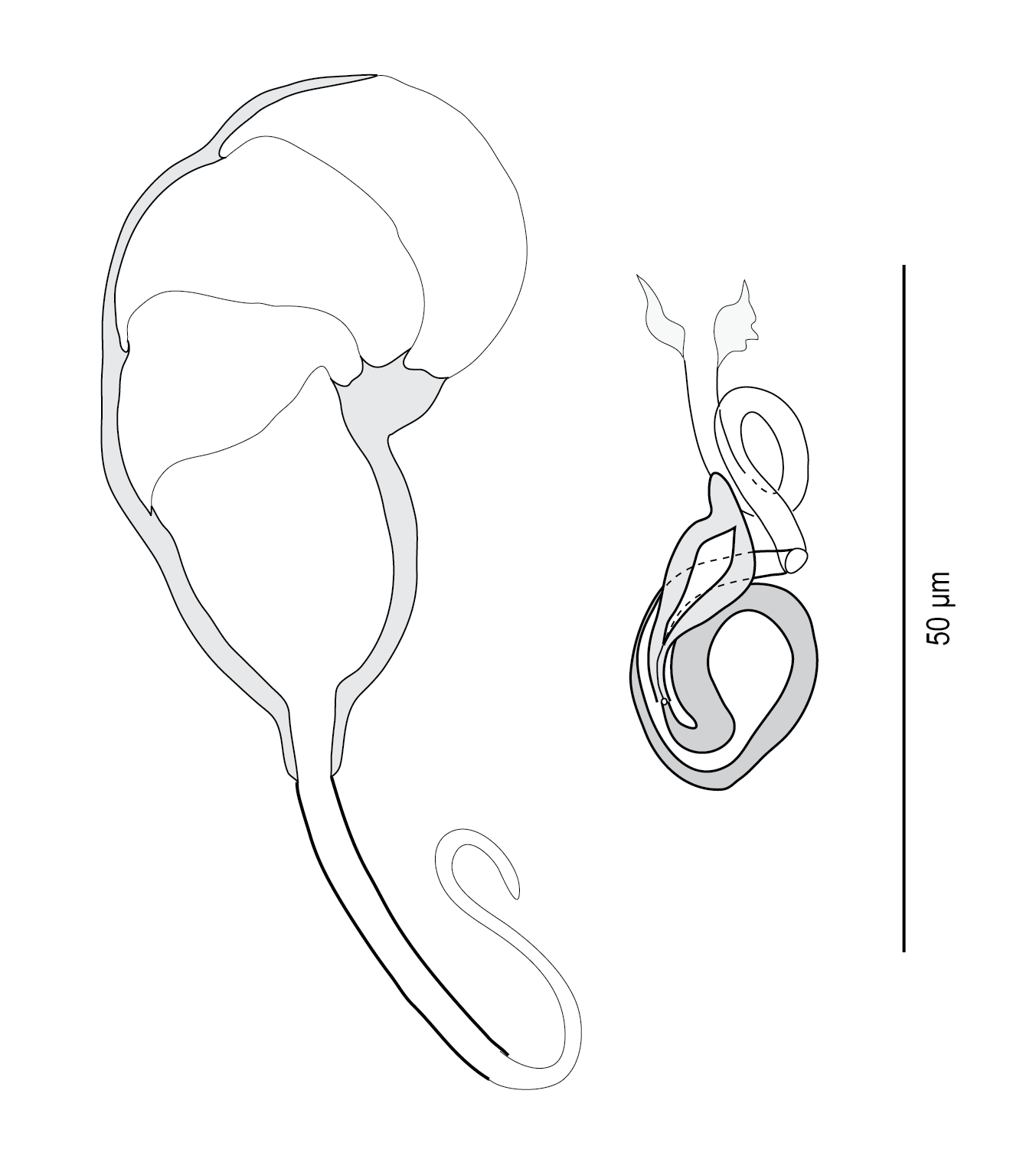
Sclerotized copulatory organs of Pseudorhabdosynochus epinepheli (left, male; right, female)

Pseudorhabdosynochus epinepheli is a small monogenean, about half a millimetre in length. Adults are hermaphroditic. The species has the general characteristics of other diplectanids, with a flat body and a posterior haptor, which is the organ by which the monogenean attaches itself to the gill of is host. The haptor bears two squamodiscs, one ventral and one dorsal, which are made up of numerous rows of rodlets.

The reproductive organ include a single ovary and a single testis. The sclerotized male copulatory organ, or "quadriloculate organ", has the shape of a bean with four internal chambers, as in other species of Pseudorhabdosynochus. The vagina also includes a sclerotized part, which is a complex structure. The sclerotised vagina comprises an anterior trumpet, followed by a primary canal, a primary chamber, a secondary canal, a secondary chamber and an accessory structure. The trumpet is in continuity with the unsclerotised vagina. The primary canal is thin-walled, with regular diameter and wide lumen, and is coiled once. The primary chamber is heavily sclerotised, and complex in shape: a pear-shaped cavity continued as a heavily sclerotised cylinder arising from its thinner, posterior part; the cylinder curves and runs parallel with the longitudinal axis of the pear-shaped cavity; the cylinder continuous with primary canal. The secondary canal is thin, with an indistinct central lumen. The secondary canal is inserted into the cylinder of the primary chamber. The secondary chamber is continuous with the secondary canal, sclerotised, and elongate, ventral to and much smaller than the primary chamber. The accessory structure is small, inserted into the anterior extremity of the secondary chamber. The external and internal surfaces of the primary and secondary chambers are smooth.

== Nomenclature and synonyms ==
The famous Japanese parasitologist Satyu Yamaguti described the same species twice, the first time in 1938 (as Diplectanum epinepheli Yamaguti, 1938) and the second time in 1958 (as Pseudorhabdosynochus epinepheli Yamaguti, 1958). In both papers, the species was described from parasites collected from the same fish species, the grouper Epinephelus akaara off Japan.
According to Kritsky & Beverley-Burton (1986) , Pseudorhabdosynochus epinepheli Yamaguti, 1958 is a junior synonym of Pseudorhabdosynochus epinepheli (Yamaguti, 1938) Kritsky & Beverley-Burton, 1986 and Pseudorhabdosynochus epinepheli (Yamaguti, 1938) Kritsky & Beverley-Burton, 1986 is the modern valid combination for Diplectanum epinepheli Yamaguti, 1938. Re-examination of type-specimens by Jean-Lou Justine have confirmed this interpretation.
Other synonyms include Cycloplectanum americanum (Price, 1937) Oliver, 1968, partim; Cycloplectanum hongkongensis Beverley-Burton & Suriano, 1981; Cycloplectanum epinepheli (Yamaguti, 1938) Beverley-Burton & Suriano, 1981; Cycloplectanum yamagutii Beverley-Burton & Suriano, 1981; Cycloplectanum yamagutti [sic; lapsus] Beverley-Burton & Suriano, 1981.

== Hosts ==
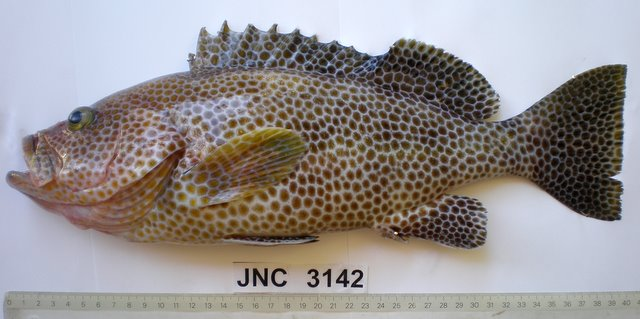
Groupers, such as the orange-spotted grouper Epinephelus chlorostigma, are hosts of Pseudorhabdosynochus epinepheli

The type-host of Pseudorhabdosynochus epinepheli is the grouper Epinephelus akaara and the type-locality if off Japan. The species has also been redescribed from the brown spotted reef cod Epinephelus chlorostigma off New Caledonia, and recorded from the orange-spotted grouper Epinephelus coioides off South China P. epinepheli has also been recorded from other fish species but these records have been questioned.
