= Haliotrema =

Scientific classification
- Kingdom: Animalia
- Phylum: Platyhelminthes
- Class: Monogenea
- Order: Dactylogyridea
- Family: Ancyrocephalidae
- Genus: Haliotrema; Johnston & Tiegs, 1922

Genus of flatworms

Haliotrema is a genus of flatworms belonging to the family Ancyrocephalidae.

The species of this genus are found in Pacific Ocean and America.

Species:

- Haliotrema abaddon Kritsky & Stephens, 2001
- Haliotrema acanthuri Yamaguti, 1968
- Haliotrema alatum Yamaguti, 1942
- Haliotrema allornata Paperna, 1972
- Haliotrema amanses Yamaguti, 1968
- Haliotrema amplimacrohamus Zhukov, 1980
- Haliotrema ampliocuspidis Bychowsky & Nagibina, 1971
- Haliotrema angelopterum Plaisance, Bouamer & Morand, 2004
- Haliotrema angulocirrus Yamaguti, 1968
- Haliotrema arsiosa Venkatanarasaiah, 1984
- Haliotrema auribaculum Zhukov, 1980
- Haliotrema aurigae (Yamaguti, 1968) Plaisance, Bouamer & Morand, 2004
- Haliotrema aurigae Yamaguti, 1968
- Haliotrema australe Johnston & Tiegs, 1922
- Haliotrema balisticus (Hargis, 1955) Yamaguti, 1963
- Haliotrema banana Lim & Justine, 2007
- Haliotrema bifurcocirrus Yamaguti, 1968
- Haliotrema bihamulatum Zhang, 2001
- Haliotrema bilobatum (Yamaguti, 1953) Bychowsky & Nagibina, 1970
- Haliotrema bisegmentatum Yamaguti, 1968
- Haliotrema bodiani Yamaguti, 1968
- Haliotrema breve (Mizelle & Price, 1964) Young, 1968
- Haliotrema brevicirrus Zhukov, 1980
- Haliotrema brevicornigerum Zhukov, 1981
- Haliotrema brevispirocirrus Zhukov, 1981
- Haliotrema brotulae Yamaguti, 1968
- Haliotrema caballeroi Euzet & Vala, 1977
- Haliotrema caesiopercae Yamaguti, 1968
- Haliotrema canescens (Mizelle & Price, 1964) Young, 1968
- Haliotrema caraibense Euzet & Vala, 1977
- Haliotrema centropygis Yamaguti, 1968
- Haliotrema chelicirrus Yamaguti, 1968
- Haliotrema chenhsintaoi Zhang, 2001
- Haliotrema chromidis Yamaguti, 1968
- Haliotrema cirrhitusi Mendoza-Franco & Violante-Gonzalez, 2011
- Haliotrema conspecta Zhukov, 1980
- Haliotrema cornutum (Mizelle & Kritsky, 1969) Vala, Maillard & Overstreet, 1982
- Haliotrema cromileptis Young, 1968
- Haliotrema crymanum Klassen, 1993
- Haliotrema ctenochaeti Young, 1968
- Haliotrema cumanense Mago Guevara, Fuentes Zambrano & Chinchilla Martínez, 2005
- Haliotrema curvicirrus Yamaguti, 1968
- Haliotrema curvipenis Paperna, 1972
- Haliotrema dascyllusi Paperna, 1972
- Haliotrema daurai Agrawal, Vishwakarma, Devak & Srivastava, 2004
- Haliotrema dempsteri (Mizelle & Price, 1964) Young, 1968
- Haliotrema dicollinum Zhang, 2001
- Haliotrema diplotaenia Cruces, Chero & Luque, 2018
- Haliotrema discalariforme Zhang, 2001
- Haliotrema dongshaense Sun, Gibson & Yang, 2011
- Haliotrema eilatica (Paperna, 1965) Bychowsky & Nagibina, 1969
- Haliotrema eilaticum (Paperna, 1965) Young, 1968
- Haliotrema epinepheli Young, 1968
- Haliotrema flagellatum Yamaguti, 1968
- Haliotrema flagellocirrus Bychowsky & Nagibina, 1971
- Haliotrema flexicirrus Yamaguti, 1968
- Haliotrema geminatohamula Bychowsky & Nagibina, 1970
- Haliotrema glandulosum Vala, Maillard & Overstreet, 1982
- Haliotrema golvani Euzet & Vala, 1977
- Haliotrema gruinale Zhang, 2001
- Haliotrema guadeloupense Vala, Maillard & Overstreet, 1982
- Haliotrema hatampo Machida & Araki, 1977
- Haliotrema holocentri Young, 1968
- Haliotrema indicum Tripathi, 1959
- Haliotrema japonense Yamaguti, 1934
- Haliotrema johnstoni Bychowsky & Nagibina, 1970
- Haliotrema kritskyi Vala, Maillard & Overstreet, 1982
- Haliotrema kusafugu Klassen, 1993
- Haliotrema lactophrys (MacCallum, 1915) Vala, Maillard & Overstreet, 1982
- Haliotrema lactoriae Yamaguti, 1968
- Haliotrema leporinus Sun, Kritsky & Yang, 2007
- Haliotrema lineati Young, 1968
- Haliotrema longiangusticirrus Zhukov, 1981
- Haliotrema longicornigerum Zhukov, 1981
- Haliotrema longirectocirrus Zhukov, 1980
- Haliotrema macracantha Yamaguti, 1968
- Haliotrema magnihamus Bychowsky & Nagibina, 1970
- Haliotrema minutospirale Yamaguti, 1968
- Haliotrema minutum Vala, Maillard & Overstreet, 1982
- Haliotrema mugilis (Tripathi, 1959) Yamaguti, 1963
- Haliotrema myripritisi Zhukov, 1980
- Haliotrema nanhaiense Sun, Yang & Yang, 2015
- Haliotrema neobilobatum Bychowsky & Nagibina, 1970
- Haliotrema nigrofusci Sun, Gibson & Yang, 2011
- Haliotrema obesum (Caballero, Bravo-Hollis & Grocott, 1955) Young, 1968
- Haliotrema ornatum Yamaguti, 1942
- Haliotrema pachycirra Paperna, 1972
- Haliotrema pacificum (Mizelle & Kritsky, 1969) Vala, Maillard & Overstreet, 1982
- Haliotrema palmatum Yamaguti, 1968
- Haliotrema papillibaculum Zhukov, 1980
- Haliotrema parahaliotrema (Mizelle & Price, 1964) Young, 1968
- Haliotrema parvihamus Bychowsky & Nagibina, 1970
- Haliotrema pempherii Bychowsky & Nagibinia, 1970
- Haliotrema pervagoris Yamaguti, 1968
- Haliotrema pollexinus Mendoza-Franco & Violante-Gonzalez, 2011
- Haliotrema polyspirotubiferum Wang, Liu & Zhou, 2003
- Haliotrema pratasense Sun, Kritsky & Yang, 2007
- Haliotrema priacanthi Yamaguti, 1968
- Haliotrema pseudupenei Zhukov, 1981
- Haliotrema pteroisi Paperna, 1972
- Haliotrema pterophallus Yamaguti, 1968
- Haliotrema rameshwarense Agrawal, Vishwakarma, Devak & Srivastava, 2004
- Haliotrema rectangulare Yamaguti, 1968
- Haliotrema recurvatum Yamaguti, 1942
- Haliotrema saezae Cruces, Chero & Luque, 2018
- Haliotrema sanchezae Cruces, Chero, Sáez & Luque, 2017
- Haliotrema scari Young, 1968
- Haliotrema scyphovagina Yamaguti, 1968
- Haliotrema serpenticirrus Yamaguti, 1968
- Haliotrema shanweii Li, 2007
- Haliotrema sigmoidocirrus Yamaguti, 1968
- Haliotrema spariensis Roubal, 1981
- Haliotrema spiculare Yamaguti, 1968
- Haliotrema spinicirrus (Yamaguti, 1953) Bychowsky & Nagibina, 1970
- Haliotrema spirale Yamaguit, 1968
- Haliotrema spirophallus Yamaguti, 1937
- Haliotrema subtilihamula Bychoswky & Nagibina, 1971
- Haliotrema surculocirrus Bychowsky & Nagibina, 1971
- Haliotrema susanae Soo, 2018
- Haliotrema swatowense Yao, Wang, Xia & Chen, 1998
- Haliotrema tachypliformis Wang, Liu & Zhou, 2003
- Haliotrema tenucirrus Bychowsky & Nagibina, 1971
- Haliotrema tenuihamus Zhukov, 1980
- Haliotrema teuthis (MacCallum, 1915) Young, 1968
- Haliotrema tiegsi Bychowsky & Nagibina, 1970
- Haliotrema torridum Vala, Maillard & Overstreet, 1982
- Haliotrema triacanthi (Tripathi, 1957) Young, 1968
- Haliotrema triostegum Sun, Yang & Yang, 2015
- Haliotrema trochaderoi Klassen, 1993
- Haliotrema tuberobaculum Zhukov, 1980
- Haliotrema tubulovagina Yamaguti, 1968
- Haliotrema umbraculiferum Zhang, 2001
- Haliotrema upenei Yamaguti, 1953
- Haliotrema weberii Mendoza-Franco, Binning & Roche, 2017
- Haliotrema xesuri Yamaguti, 1940
- Haliotrema youngi Venkatanarasaiah, 1984
- Haliotrema zancli Yamaguti, 1968
- Haliotrema zanclus (Mizelle & Price, 1964) Young, 1968
- Haliotrema zebrasoma (Mizelle & Kritsky, 1969) Vala, Maillard & Overstreet, 1982
- Haliotrema zigmoidocirrus Sun, Gibson & Yang, 2011
