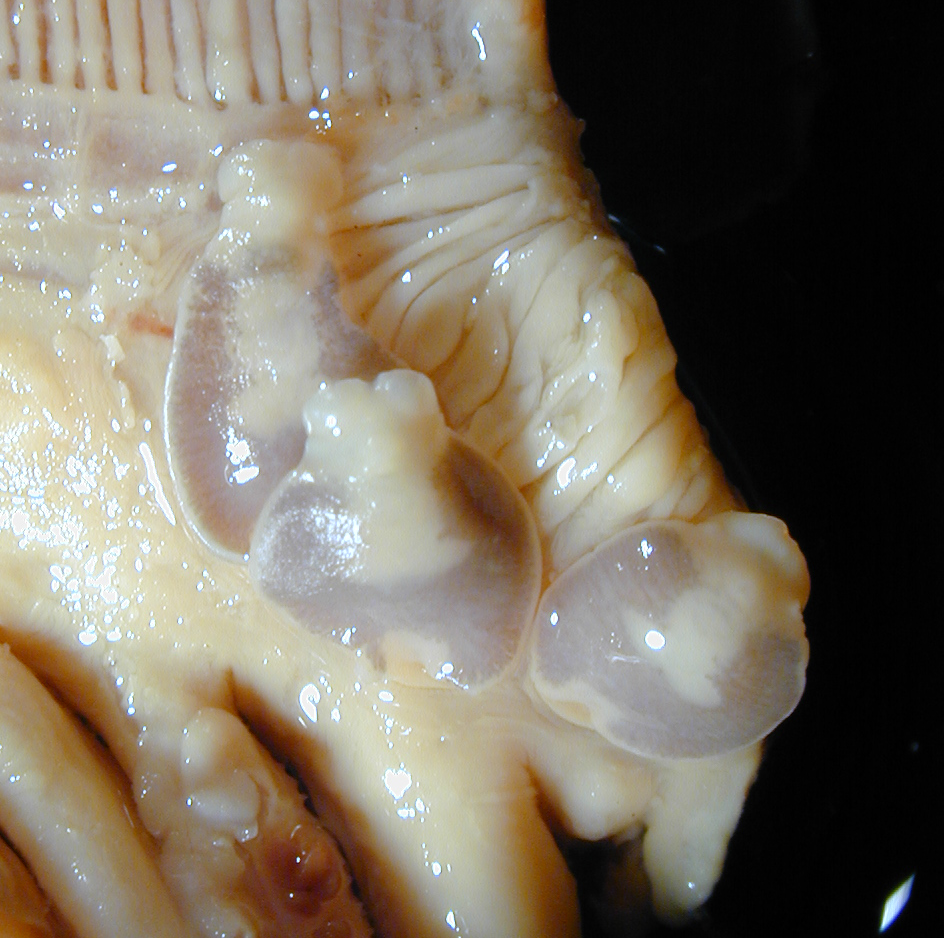
- Lagenivaginopseudobenedenia sp.

Scientific classification
- Kingdom: Animalia
- Phylum: Platyhelminthes
- Class: Monogenea
- Order: Capsalidea
- Family: Capsalidae; Baird, 1853

= Capsalidae =

Family of flatworms

Capsalidae is a family of monopisthocotylean monogeneans, which includes about 200 species.

The monophyly of the Capsalidae is supported by possession of accessory sclerites in the haptor (the posterior attachment organ), and was confirmed by molecular phylogeny. Their oncomiracidium (the free larva) is distinct from that of other families.

Capsalids are parasite on various organs of marine fish (teleosts and elasmobranchs), including skin, fins and gills. Several capsalid species, such a Neobenedenia spp. are pathogenic, especially on maricultured fish.

== Included genera ==
Genera as recognized in WorMs are listed below. Recent molecular analyses have shown that several genera, which were defined on morphological characters, are not monophyletic.

Menziesia and Nitzschia have their equivalent in the botanical nomenclature: Menziesia (a flowering plant) and Nitzschia (a diatom).

- Allobenedenia Yamaguti, 1963
- Alloencotyllabe Khalil & Abdul-Salam, 1988
- Allomegalocotyla Yamaguti, 1963
- Allometabenedeniella Velasquez, 1982
- Ancyrocotyle Parona & Monticelli, 1903
- Benedenia Diesing, 1858
- Benedeniella Johnston, 1929
- Branchobdella Kearn, Whittington & Evans-Gowing, 2007
- Calicobenedenia Kritsky & Fennessy, 1999
- Capsala Bosc, 1811
- Capsaloides Price, 1936
- Dioncopseudobenedenia Yamaguti, 1965
- Encotyllabe Diesing, 1850
- Entobdella Blainville in Lamarck, 1818
- Interniloculus Suriano & Beverley-Burton, 1979
- Lagenivaginopseudobenedenia Yamaguti, 1966
- Listrocephalos Bullard, Payne & Braswell, 2004
- Macrophyllida Johnston, 1929
- Mediavagina Lawler & Hargis, 1968
- Megalobenedenia Egorova, 1994
- Megalocotyle Folda, 1928
- Menziesia Gibson, 1976
- Metabenedeniella Yamaguti, 1958
- Nasicola Yamaguti, 1968
- Neobenedenia Yamaguti, 1963
- Neobenedeniella Yamaguti, 1963
- Neoentobdella Kearn & Whittington, 2005
- Nitzschia Baer, 1826
- Oligoncobenedenia Yamaguti, 1965
- Pseudoallobenedenia Yamaguti, 1966
- Pseudobenedenia Johnston, 1931
- Pseudobenedeniella Timofeeva, Gaevskaja & Kovaliova, 1987
- Pseudobenedenoides Szidat, 1969
- Pseudoentobdella Yamaguti, 1963
- Pseudomegalocotyla Yamaguti, 1963
- Pseudonitzschia Yamaguti, 1968
- Sessilorbis Mamaev, 1970
- Sprostonia Bychowsky, 1957
- Sprostoniella Bychowsky & Nagibina, 1967
- Tetrasepta Suriano, 1975
- Trilobiodiscus Bychowsky & Nagibina, 1967
- Trimusculotrema Whittington & Barton, 1990
- Tristoma Cuvier, 1817
- Tristomella Guiart, 1938
- Trochopella Euzet & Trilles, 1962
- Trochopus Diesing, 1850
