= Capsalidea =

Scientific classification
- Kingdom: Animalia
- Phylum: Platyhelminthes
- Class: Monogenea
- Subclass: Monopisthocotylea
- Order: Capsalidea

Families
- Capsalidae Baird, 1853; Dionchidae Bychowsky, 1959; Enoplocotylidae Malmberg, 1990

Order of parasitic flatworms

Capsalidea is an order of parasitic flatworms in the class Monogenea.
