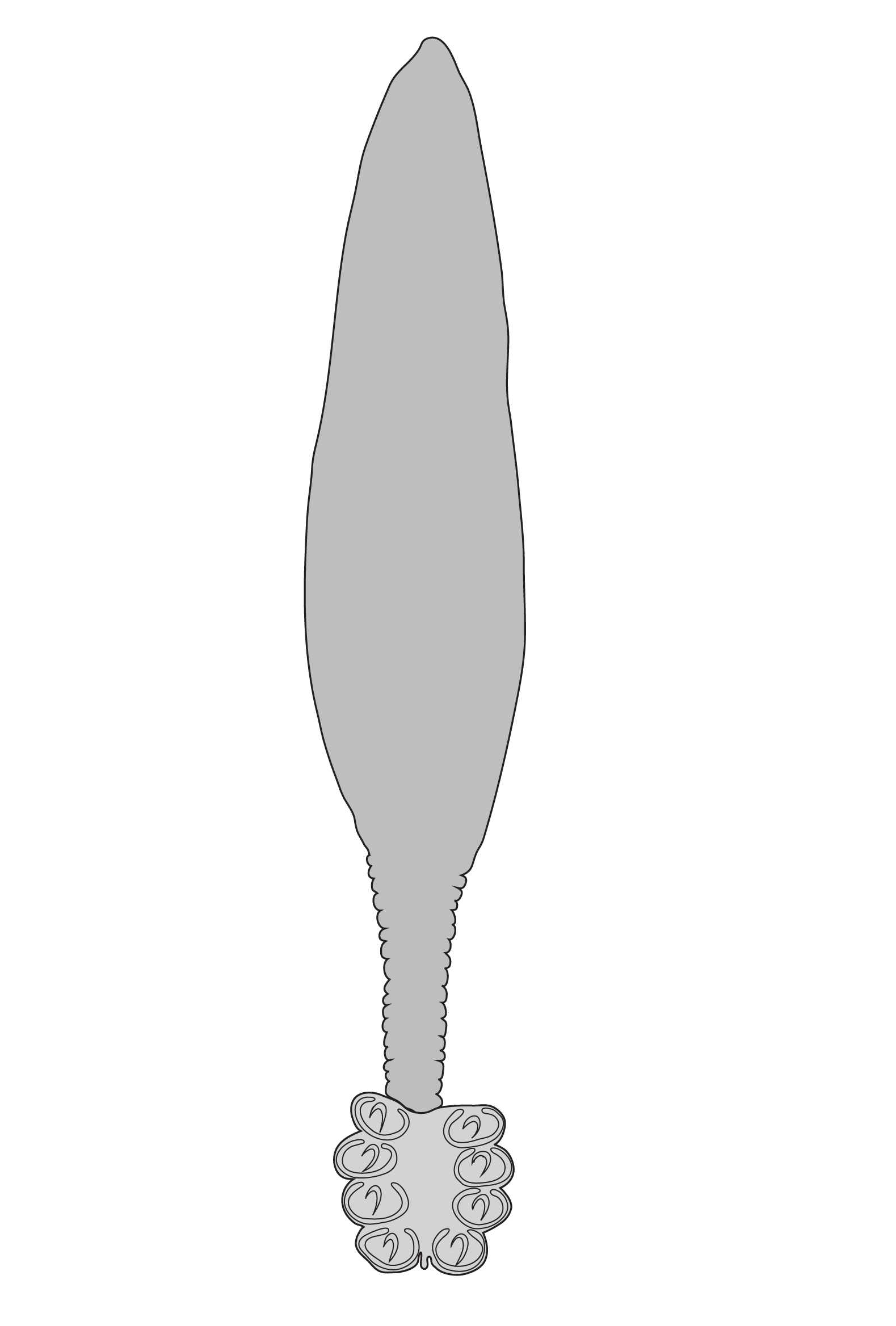

Scientific classification
- Domain: Eukaryota
- Kingdom: Animalia
- Phylum: Platyhelminthes
- Class: Monogenea
- Order: Chimaericolidea
- Family: Chimaericolidae
- Genus: Chimaericola
- Species: C. leptogaster

Binomial name
- Chimaericola leptogaster (Leuckart, 1830) Brinkmann, 1942

Synonyms
- Discocotyle leptogaster (Leuckart, 1830) Diesing, 1850; Neoheterobothrium leptogaster (Leuckart, 1830) Price, 1943; Octobothrium leptogaster Leuckart, 1830; Octocotyle leptogaster (Leuckart, 1830); Placoplectanum leptogaster (Leuckart, 1830) Diesing, 1858

= Chimaericola leptogaster =

Species of flatworm

Chimaericola leptogaster is a species of polyopisthocotylean monogenean in the family Chimaericolidae. It is ectoparasitic on the gills of the chimaera Chimaera monstrosa.

== History ==
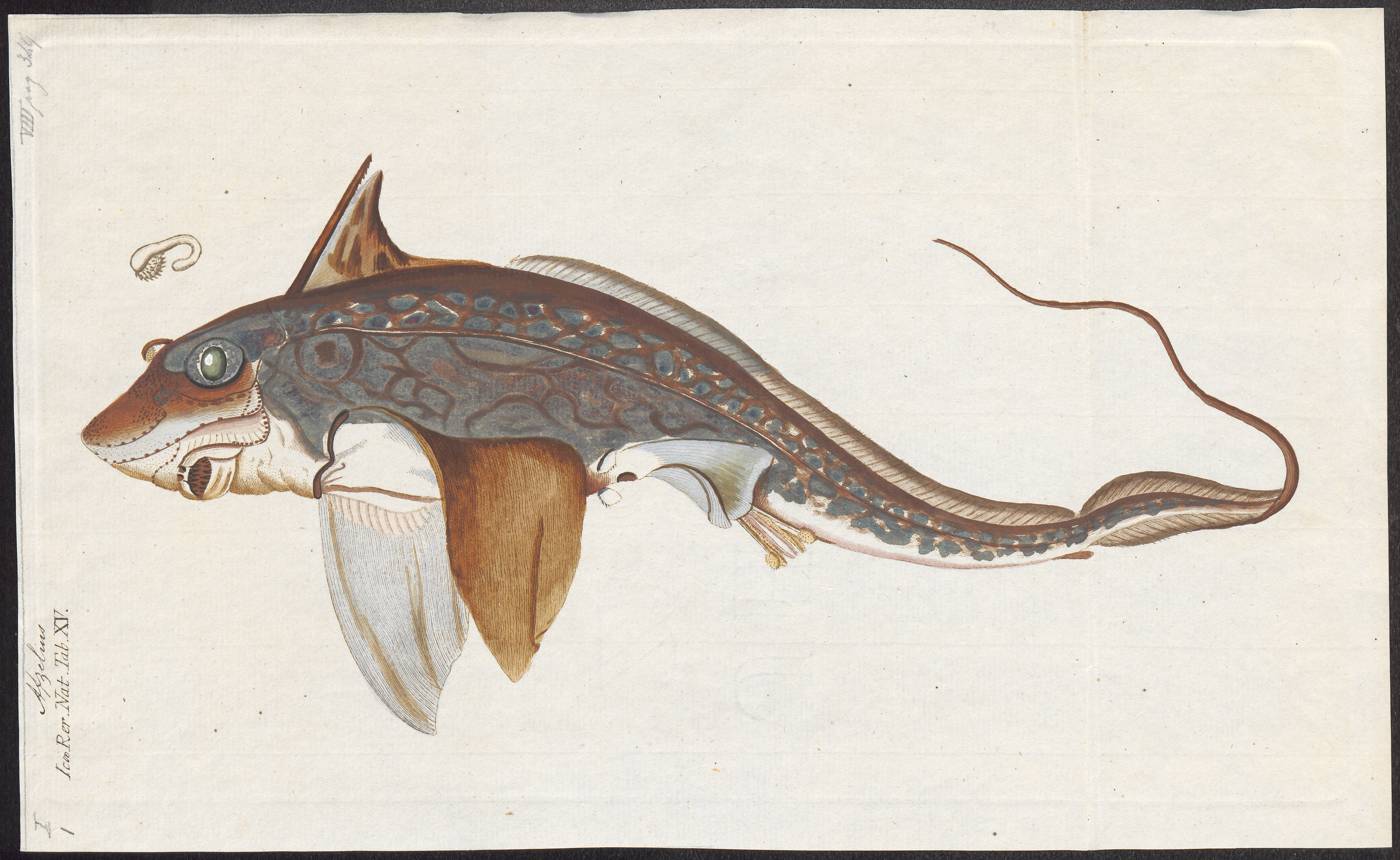
The chimaera Chimaera monstrosa is the host of Chimaericola leptogaster

According to Brinkmann, the species was discovered as early as 1828 on the gills of chimaeras off Norway by Rapp and was given a scientific name by Friedrich Sigismund Leuckart in 1830, as Octobothrium leptogaster, but Leuckart did not see the animal. The species was then mentioned by Félix Dujardin and Karl Moriz Diesing, who also did not see the specimens. However, Diesing transferred the species to the genus Discocotyle but also considered the species as "species inquirenda". Later, in 1858, Diesing transferred the species to the genus Placoplectanum. Olsson redescribed the animal in 1876 and used again the name Octobothrium leptogaster. The species was shortly redescribed by Parona & Perugia in 1892.

Finally Brinkmann redescribed the species in details in 1942 from material collected off Norway and Sweden.

== Morphology ==
Chimaericola leptogaster is a large monogenean, reaching 50 mm in length. The haptor, at the posterior end of the body, bears eight clamps arranged as two rows of four.

== Modern works ==
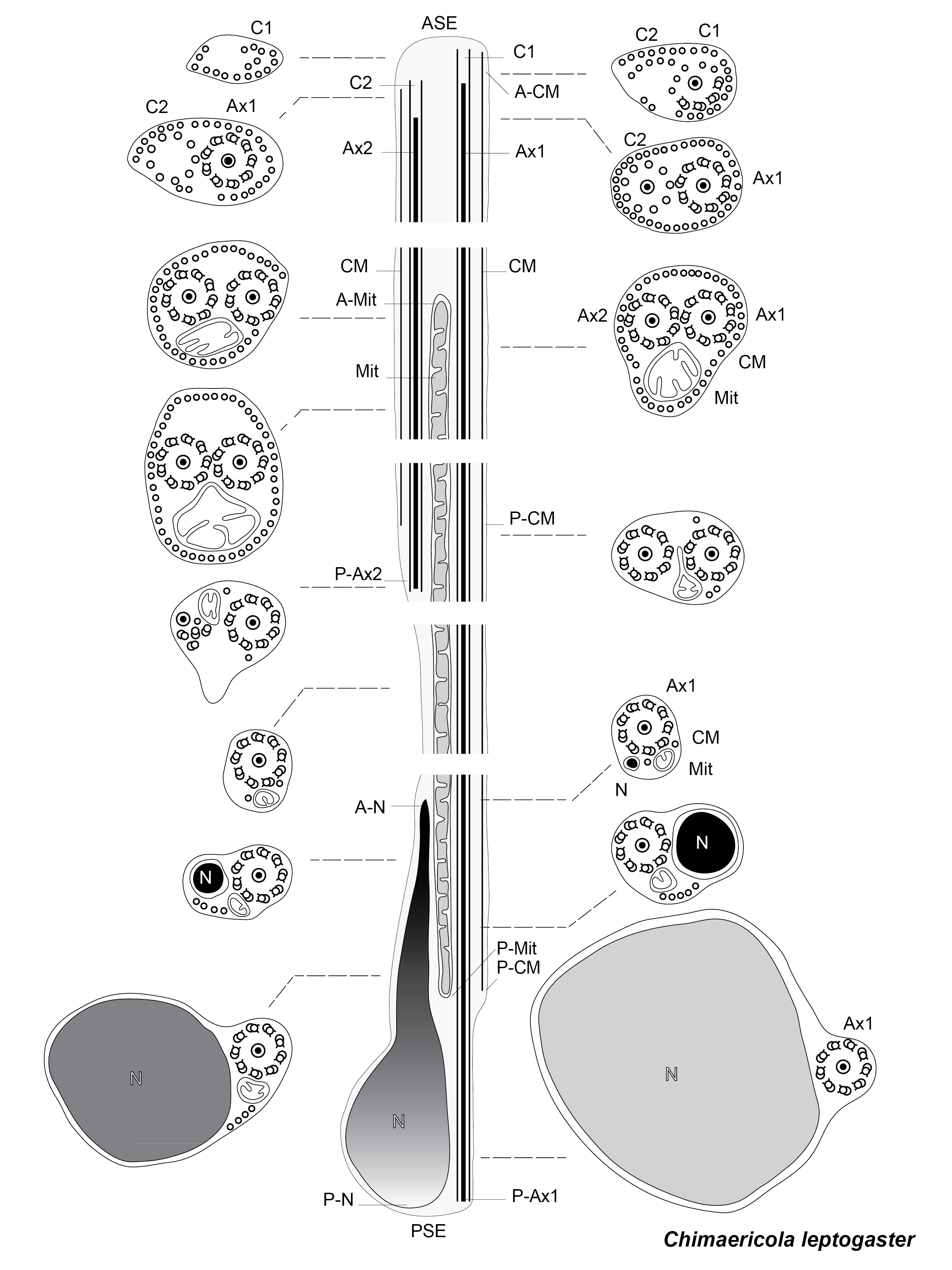
The spermatozoon of Chimaericola leptogaster (drawing)

The first molecular sequences obtained from Chimaericola leptogaster suggested that the Chimaericolidae were a basal group within the Polyopisthocotylea.

Chimaericola leptogaster was studied with transmission electron microscopy. Several organs have been investigated in details: vaginae, clamps, digestive system, and spermiogenesis and spermatozoa. These ultrastructural results have confirmed the basal position of the species in comparison to marine Polyopisthocotylea.
