= Discocotyle sagittata =

Scientific classification
- Kingdom: Animalia
- Phylum: Platyhelminthes
- Class: Monogenea
- Order: Mazocraeidea
- Family: Discocotylidae
- Genus: Discocotyle
- Species: D. sagittata

Binomial name
- Discocotyle sagittata (Leuckart, 1842)

Synonyms
- Octobothrium sagittata Leuckart, 1842

Species of flatworm

Discocotyle sagittata is a species of freshwater monogenean gill ectoparasites of Salmo and Oncorhynchus. Their lifestyle is characterised by a free-living larval stage that may be inhaled by a suitable freshwater fish host, after which they may attach upon expulsion over the gill onto a single gill filament. Upon reaching maturity, parasites can remain attached by a posterior opisthaptor with its 8 associated clamps (4 in 2 rows). Adults may reach a few millimetres in length. D. sagittata feeds on the blood of the gills via an anterior mouth part. Adults are hermaphrodite, and produce 3–14 eggs per day at 13 °C, a process which is temperature dependent. Once produced, eggs drop to the riverbed surface and at 13 °C take 28 days to develop to hatching larval forms. Major parasite burden can result in damage to the host gill and anaemia from blood loss.
