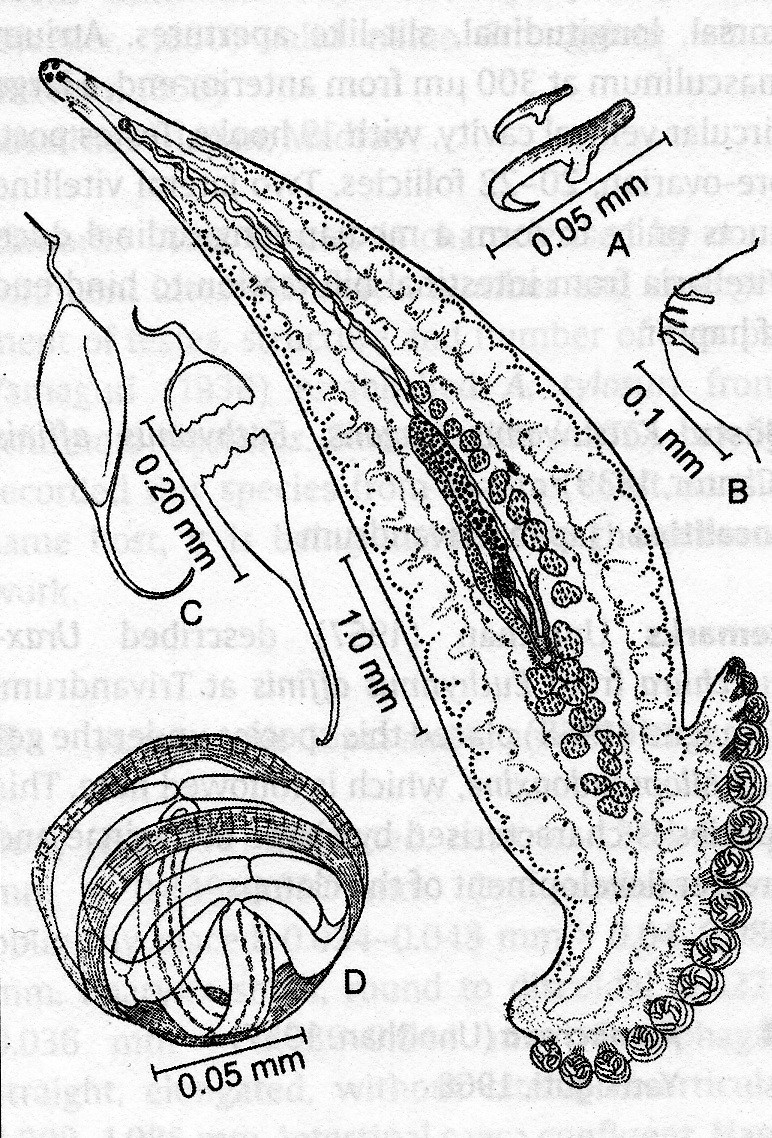
- Allopseudaxine macrova, body

Scientific classification
- Kingdom: Animalia
- Phylum: Platyhelminthes
- Class: Monogenea
- Order: Mazocraeidea
- Family: Axinidae
- Genus: Allopseudaxine
- Species: A. macrova

Binomial name
- Allopseudaxine macrova (Unnithan, 1957) Yamaguti, 1963

= Allopseudaxine macrova =

Species of worms

Allopseudaxine macrova is a species of monogenean flatworm, which is parasitic on the gills of a marine fish. It belongs to the family Axinidae.

== Systematics ==
Allopseudaxine macrova was described from the gills of the Kawakawa Euthynnus affinis off India, as Uraxine chura maacrova. Unnithan placed Uraxine chura maacrova in the subfamily Monaxininae within Axinidae. Yamaguti considered this subspecies a synonym of Uraxine chura, transferred it to the genus Allopseudaxine and created the combination Allopseudaxine macrova. He included Allopseudaxine macrova in his new subfamily Allopseudaxininae, in Axinidae.

== Description ==
The body of Allopseudaxine macrova comprises an anterior part which contains most organs, and a posterior part called the haptor. The haptor is delimited from the body by a constriction and bears a single row of clamps. The clamps of the haptor attach the animal to the gill of the fish. A short terminal lappet is present, and is armed with two pairs of hooks. There are also two buccal suckers at the anterior extremity. The digestive organs include an anterior mouth, a pharynx, an oesophagus and a posterior intestine that bifurcates at or near level of genital pore in two lateral branches. Each adult contains male and female reproductive organs. The reproductive organs include an anterior genital atrium armed with a corona of 17 hooks, two unarmed vaginal pores, with sub marginal dorsal longitudinal slit like apertures, situated behind the penis on each side of the body but not at the same level, a looped ovary and numerous testes para and post-ovarian. The eggs are spindle-shaped, with filaments at both poles.

== Hosts and localities ==
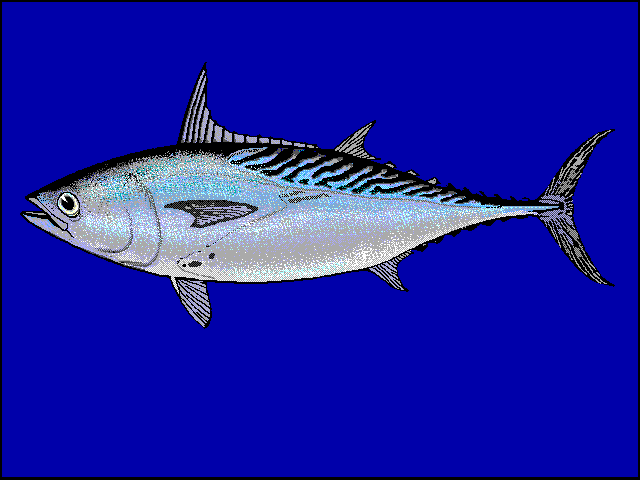
The Kawakawa Euthynnus affinis is the type host of Allopseudaxine katsuwonis

The type-host is the Kawakawa Euthynnus affinis (Scombridae). The type locality is off India.
