= Acanthocotyle elegans =

Scientific classification
- Kingdom: Animalia
- Phylum: Platyhelminthes
- Class: Monogenea
- Order: Gyrodactylidea
- Family: Acanthocotylidae
- Genus: Acanthocotyle
- Species: A. elegans

Binomial name
- Acanthocotyle elegans (Monticelli, 1890)

Species of flatworm

Acanthocotyle elegans is a species of monogenean fish skin parasites.
