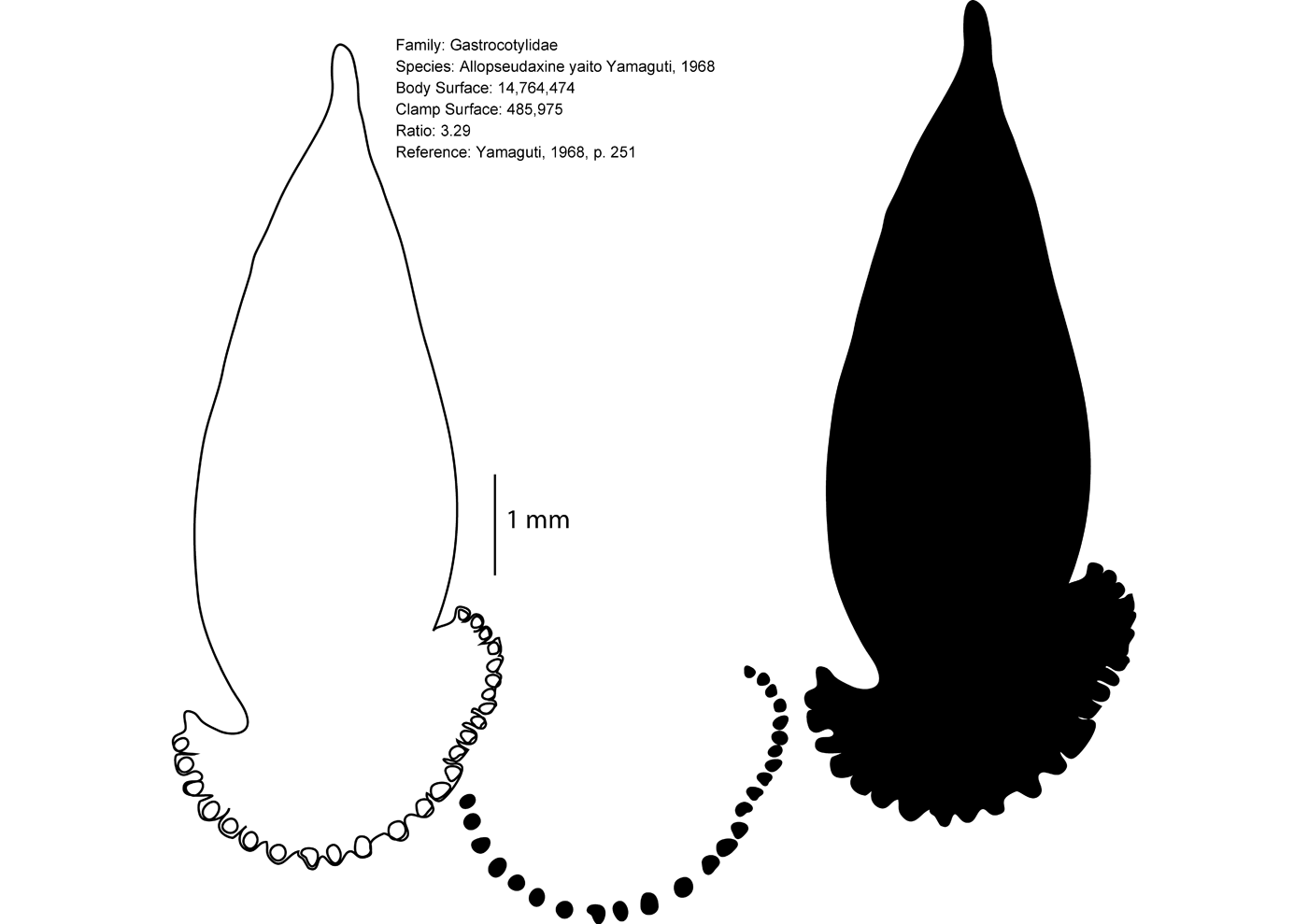

Scientific classification
- Kingdom: Animalia
- Phylum: Platyhelminthes
- Class: Monogenea
- Order: Mazocraeidea
- Family: Axinidae
- Genus: Allopseudaxine
- Species: A. yaito

Binomial name
- Allopseudaxine yaito Yamaguti, 1968

= Allopseudaxine yaito =

Species of worms

Allopseudaxine yaito is a species of monogenean flatworm, which is parasitic on the gills of a marine fish. It belongs to the family Axinidae.

== Systematics ==
Allopseudaxine yaito was described based on three gravid specimens from the kawakawa or mackerel tuna Euthynnus yaito (currently named Euthynnus affinis), off Hawaii.

== Description ==
The body of Allopseudaxine yaito comprises an anterior part tapered anteriorly, which contains most organs and a posterior part called the haptor. The haptor is semicircular, with 15-26 clamps. The clamps of the haptor attach the animal to the gill of the fish. A long conical lappet is present, and is armed with two pairs of hooks. There are also two buccal suckers at the anterior extremity. The digestive organs include an anterior mouth, a pharynx, an oesophagus and a posterior intestine that bifurcates at about the level of genital pore in two lateral branches. The intestinal branches terminate at posterior end of body proper, the left limb extends along the haptor and reaches the lappet. Each adult contains male and female reproductive organs. The reproductive organs include an anterior genital atrium armed with a crown of 13 hooks, a cirrus bulbous projecting into genital atrium, armed with a crown of slender spines, one row of ventrosubmarginal vaginae on each side of the body, each row divided into a longitudinal row of transverse slit-like areolae with heavily cuticularized margins, and each row is connected with the reticular vitelline ducts of its own side, an ovary, and 40-65 large testes pre, para and post-ovarian.

== Hosts and localities ==
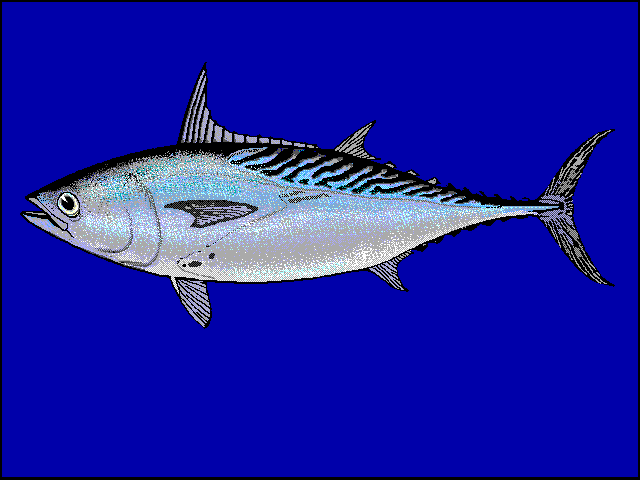
Euthynnus affinis is the type host of Allopseudaxine yaito

The type-host is the kawakawa or mackerel tuna Euthynnus affinis (Scombridae). The type-locality is off Hawaii.
