= Plectanocotyle =

Scientific classification
- Kingdom: Animalia
- Phylum: Platyhelminthes
- Class: Monogenea
- Order: Mazocraeidea
- Family: Plectanocotylidae
- Genus: Plectanocotyle; Diesing, 1850

Type species
- Plectanocotyle elliptica Diesing, 1850

Genus of flatworms

Plectanocotyle is a genus of monogeneans in the family Plectanocotylidae. It includes five species of parasites on the gills of fish.

== Species ==
According to a study funded by The Swedish Taxonomy Initiative, there are four valid species in this genus:

- Plectanocotyle gurnardi (Van Beneden & Hesse, 1863) Llewellyn, 1941
- Plectanocotyle jeanloujustinei Cappelletti & Bouguerche, 2024
- Plectanocotyle lastovizae Ayadi, Tazerouti, Gey & Justine, 2022
- Plectanocotyle major Boudaya, Neifar & Euzet, 2006

== Other Species ==
Plectanocotyle elliptica Diesing, 1850: described probably based on a mutilated specimen, and most importantly, it was suggested that either the host fish had been misidentified or the specimen had been mislabeled as to origin (Price, 1961). It is considered currently a species inquirenda.

Plectanocotyle caudata Lebour, 1908: considered currently synonym of P. gurnardi.

Plectanocotyle lorenzii Monticelli, 1899: considered currently a species inquirenda.
