= Plectanocotyle lastovizae =

Scientific classification
- Kingdom: Animalia
- Phylum: Platyhelminthes
- Class: Monogenea
- Order: Mazocraeidea
- Family: Plectanocotylidae
- Genus: Plectanocotyle
- Species: P. lastovizae

Binomial name
- Plectanocotyle lastovizae Ayadi, Tazerouti, Gey & Justine, 2022

Synonyms
- Plectanocotyle sp. of Jovelin & Justine, 2001

Species of flatworm

Plectanocotyle lastovizae is a species of monogenean in the genus Plectanocotyle.

== Host and localities ==
Plectanocotyle lastovizae is a parasite of the gills of the streaked gurnard Chelidonichthys lastoviza (Bonnaterre, 1788). The type locality is off Bouharoun, near Alger, Algeria, in the Mediterranean Sea. Another locality is off Sète, France, Mediterranean Sea.

== Etymology ==
The species was named after its host, Chelidonichthys lastoviza.
