= Mazocraeidae =

Scientific classification
- Kingdom: Animalia
- Phylum: Platyhelminthes
- Class: Monogenea
- Order: Mazocraeidea
- Family: Mazocraeidae; Price, 1936

Genera
- See text

Family of flatworms

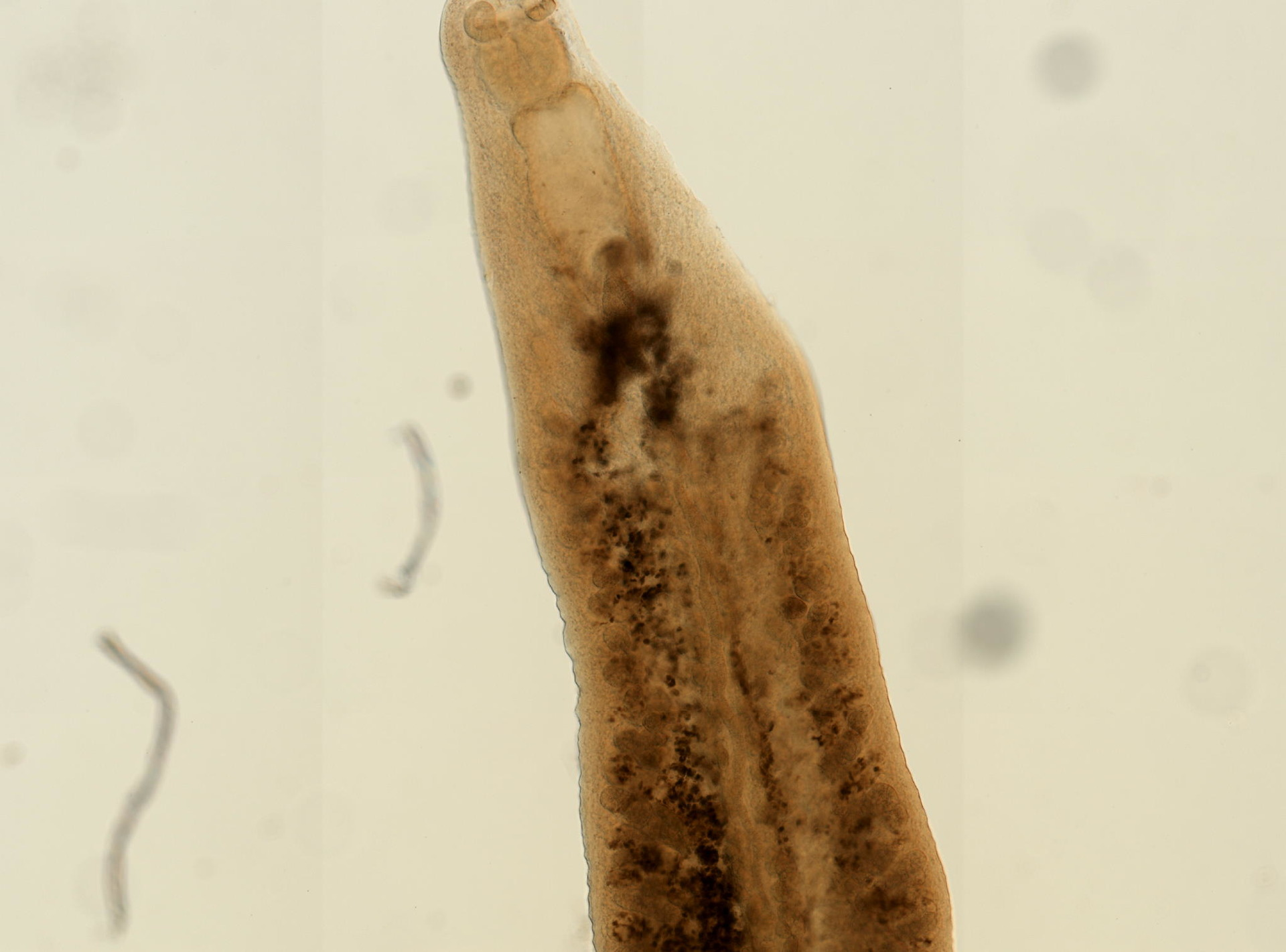
Preserved Mazocraeidae specimen on microslide

Mazocraeidae is a flatworm family in the order Mazocraeidea.

== Genera ==
according to PESI

- Grubea Diesing, 1858
- Kuhnia Sproston, 1945
- Mazocraeoides Price, 1936
- Mazocraes Hermann, 1782
- Ophicotyle Beneden & Hesse, 1863
- Pseudanthocotyloides Price, 1959
- Pseudoanthocotyle Bychowsky & Nagibina, 1954
- Pseudokuhnia Rohde & Watson, 1985

According to the World Register of Marine Species

- Clupeocotyle Hargis, 1955
- Cribromazocraes Mamaev, 1981
- Grubea Diesing, 1858
- Heteromazocraes Mamaev, 1981
- Kuhnia Sproston, 1945
- Leptomazocraes Mamaev, 1975
- Mazocraeoides Price, 1936
- Mazocraes Hermann, 1782
- Neogrubea
- Neomazocraes Price, 1934
- Ophicotyle Beneden & Hesse, 1863
- Paramazocraes Tripathi, 1959
- Pseudanthocotyle Bychowsky & Nagibina, 1954
- Pseudanthocotyloides Price, 1959
- Pseudokuhnia Rohde & Watson, 1985
- Pseudomazocraes Price, 1961
- Reimericotyle Mamaev, 1984
- Taurimazocraes Mamaev, 1982
- Pseudoanthocotyloides Price, 1959 accepted as Pseudanthocotyloides Price, 1959
