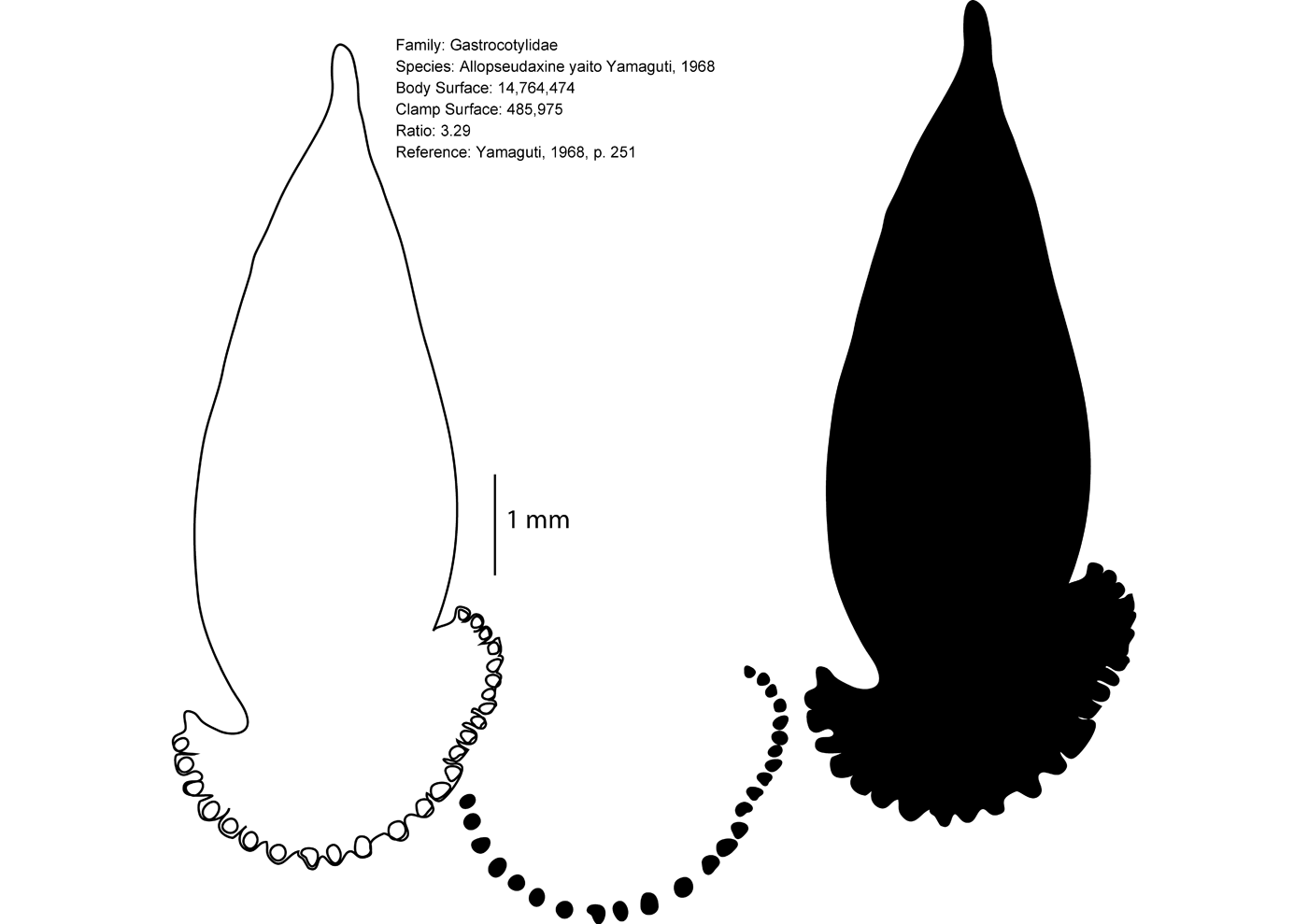
- Allopseudaxine yaito

Scientific classification
- Kingdom: Animalia
- Phylum: Platyhelminthes
- Class: Monogenea
- Order: Mazocraeidea
- Family: Axinidae
- Genus: Allopseudaxine; Yamaguti, 1943

= Allopseudaxine =

Genus of flatworms

Allopseudaxine is a genus which belongs to the phylum Platyhelminthes and class Monogenea; all its species are parasites of fish.

== Morphology ==
Species of Allopseudaxine are ectoparasites that attach themselves as larvae to the gills of fish, and grow into their adult stage. This larval stage is called oncomiracidium, and is characterized by free swimming and cilia. The name Allopseudaxine is composed of the prefix Allo meaning different, and a root Pseudaxine, a gastrocotylid monogenean. Thus the name Allopseudaxine means "different from Pseudaxine". In fact, species of Allopseudaxine have a large body tapering anteriorly, and a unilateral, oblique haptor (a single oblique row of clamps), giving them a triangular appearance. With this shape, they superficially resemble gastrocotylid monogeneans like members of Pseudaxine or Allogastrocotyle. However, species of Allopseudaxine can be distinguished from these Gastrocotylidae by their clamp structure and also the arrangement of testes: in Allopseudaxine testes are para-ovarian and post-ovarian, whereas in gastrocotylids testes are only post-ovarian.

== Systematics ==
The genus Allopseudaxine was created by Yamaguti in 1943, to include Pseudaxine katsuwonis. This genus was placed in a new family erected by Price, Allopseudaxinidae. Currently, it is included with Allopseudaxinoides in the subfamily Allopseudaxininae and the family Axinidae.

== Species ==
Four species have been included in Allopseudaxine:

- Allopseudaxine katsuwonis (Ishii, 1936)Yamaguti, 1943
- Allopseudaxine macrova (Unnithan, 1957) Yamaguti, 1963
- Allopseudaxine yaito Yamaguti, 1968
- Allopseudaxine vagans (Ishii, 1936)Price, 1962 currently included in the genus Allopseudaxinoides as Allopseudaxinoides vagans (Ishii, 1936)Yamaguti, 1968
