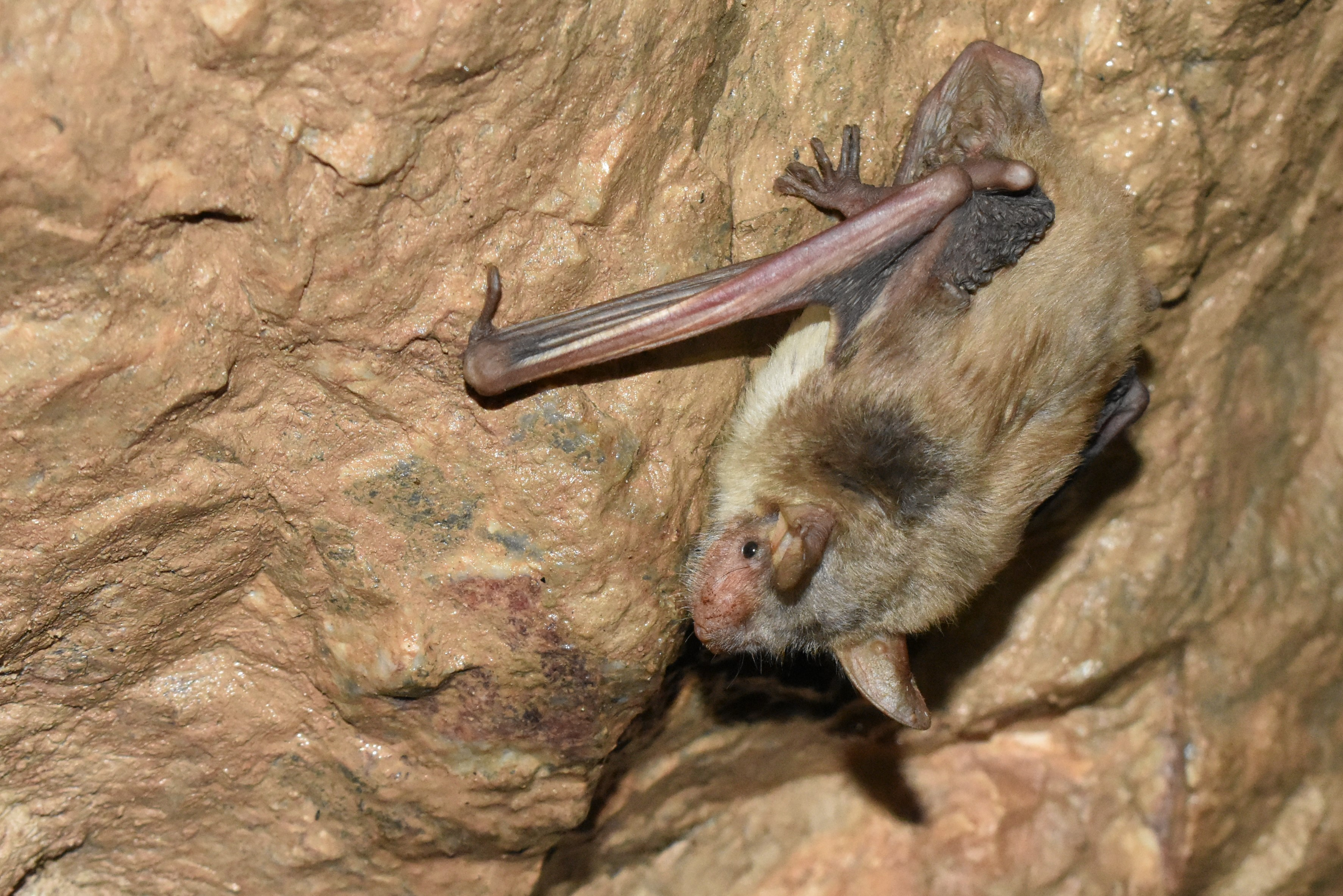

Conservation status
- Least Concern (IUCN 3.1)

Scientific classification
- Kingdom: Animalia
- Phylum: Chordata
- Class: Mammalia
- Order: Chiroptera
- Family: Vespertilionidae
- Genus: Myotis
- Species: M. blythii

Binomial name
- Myotis blythii (Tomes, 1857)
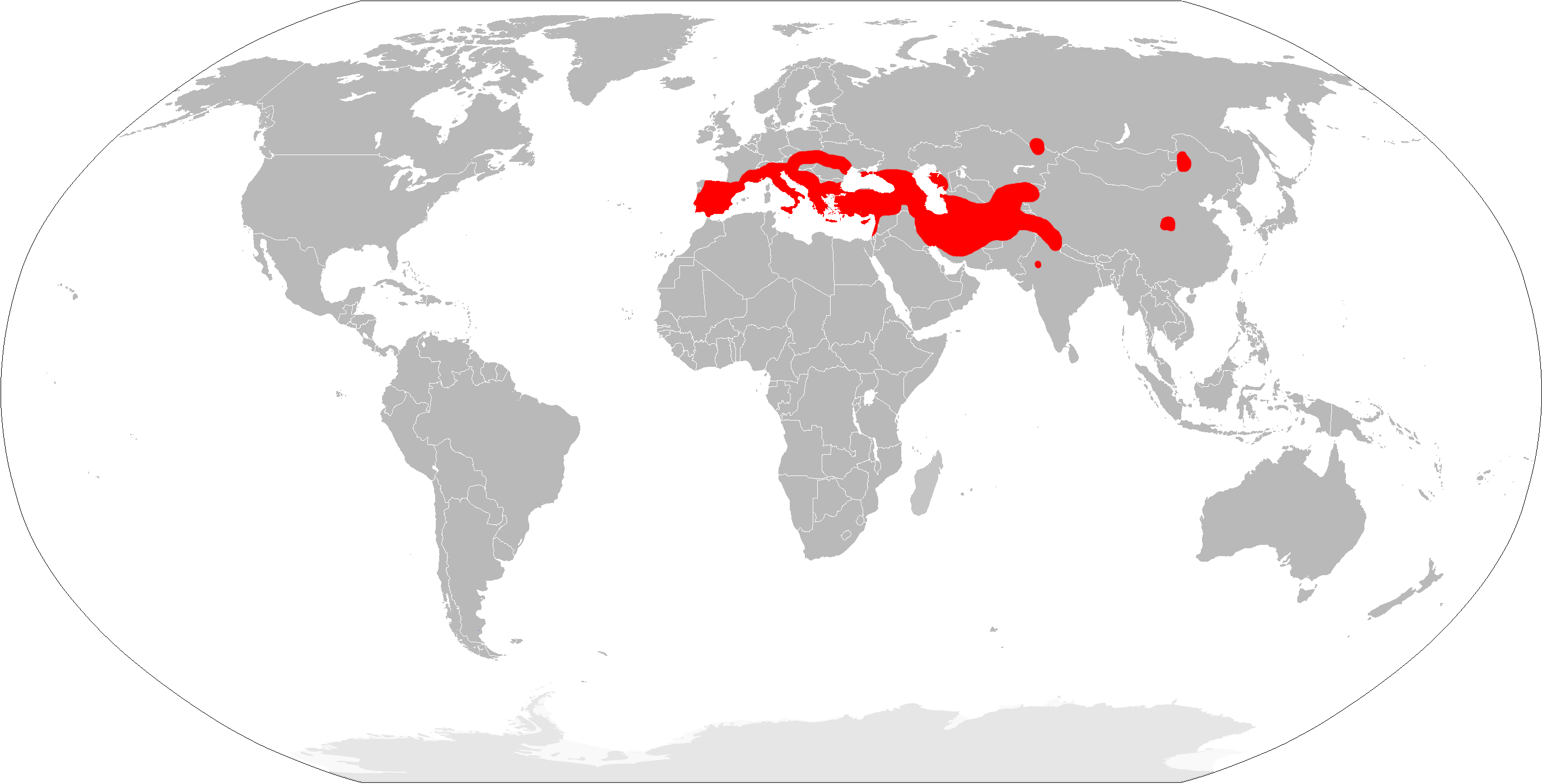
- Myotis blythii distribution

Synonyms
- Vespertilio blythii Tomes, 1857; Vespertilio oxygnathus Monticelli, 1885; Myotis oxygnathus Monticelli, 1885

= Lesser mouse-eared bat =

Species of bat

The lesser mouse-eared bat or lesser mouse-eared myotis (Myotis blythii) is a species of insectivorous bat in the family Vespertilionidae. This species has a wide distribution from the Iberian Peninsula to China.

== Taxonomy ==
The lesser mouse-eared bat has a complex taxonomic history. The oldest name is Vespertilio blythii which was given to a single specimen in the British Museum (Natural History) which was labelled "India" by Robert F. Tomes in 1857. In 1885 Francesco Saverio Monticelli described Vespertilio oxygnathus from Italy. Subsequent studies found very little morphological difference between Tomes's taxon in India and the European bats described by Moniticelli and so they were synonymised. Further studies found that the populations found between Europe and India, in Asia Minor, were larger, approaching the greater mouse-eard bat in size and these were named as the subspecies M. blythii omari with a fourth, isolated subspecies being described from southern Siberia and northern China, M. blythii ancilla.

== Distribution ==
Lesser mouse-eared bats can be found in the following countries: Afghanistan, Albania, Austria, Bangladesh, Bulgaria, China, Croatia, France, Georgia, Germany, Greece, Hungary, India, Iran, Iraq, Israel, Italy, Jordan, Kazakhstan, Lebanon, Mongolia, Pakistan, Portugal, Romania, Russia, Slovenia, Cyprus, Spain, Switzerland, Syria, Turkmenistan, and Ukraine.

== Threats ==
The species is decreasing in population due to the pollution and changes in land management. Construction noise has disturbed populations in southern Spain; the population in Andalusia decreased from 30,000 to 14,000 between 1994 and 2002. Herders in Syria and Turkey light fires at cave mouths for their livestock disturbing the bats.

== Conservation ==
It is protected in most of Europe by Bonn and Berne Convention on the Conservation of European Wildlife and Natural Habitats. The species requires special measures including construction of designated areas, which are provided by Special Areas for Conservation. Natura 2000 is also protecting the species. In some European countries, the caves are closed with fences so that visitors do not disturb them.

== Characteristics ==
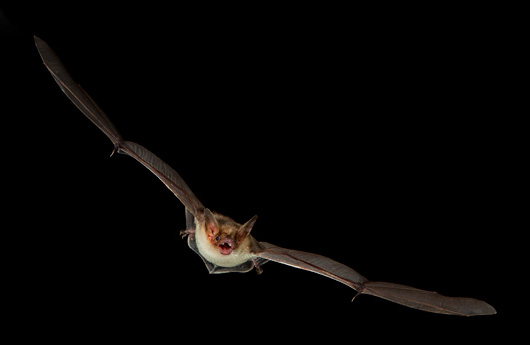
Lesser mouse-eared bat flying

The lesser mouse-eared bat is a relatively large Myotis bat, it closely resembles the greater mouse-eared bat. The back is tinged with brownish, the belly is pale greyish-white, typically rather paler than the belly of the greater mouse-eared bat. The snout is markedly shorter than that of the greater mouse-eared bat, the ears comparatively narrow and short, and the front margin of the ears are noticeably less convex. The tragus has a pale tip, with no dark spot at its end. The measurements of this bat are: the forearm is between 50.5 and 62.1 mm (1.99 and 2.44 in) in length; the fifth finger is 63 to 81 mm (2.5 to 3.2 in) long and the third finger is 85 to 103 mm (3.3 to 4.1 in) long; the wight varies between 19 and 26 g (0.67 and 0.92 oz).
