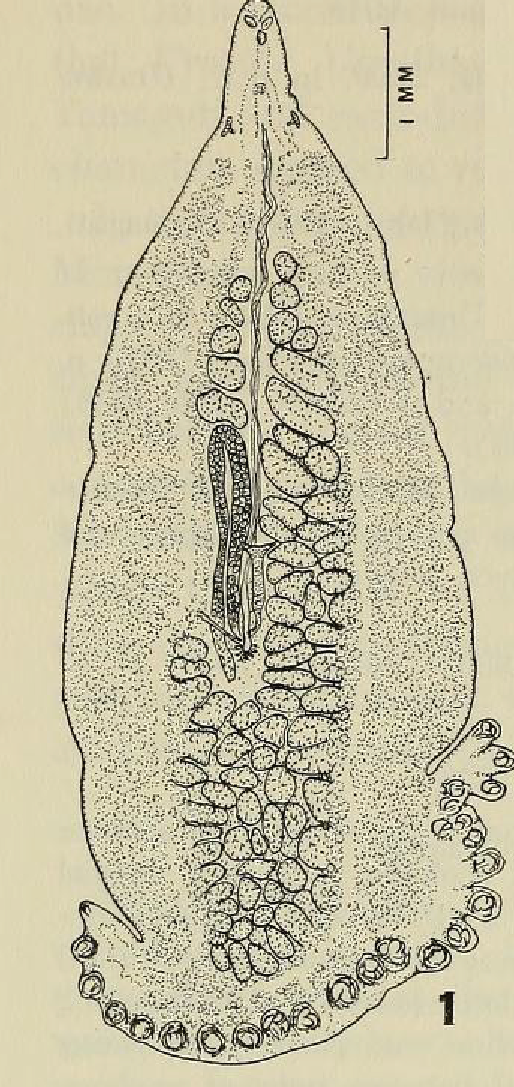
- Allopseudaxine katsuwonis , body

Scientific classification
- Kingdom: Animalia
- Phylum: Platyhelminthes
- Class: Monogenea
- Order: Mazocraeidea
- Family: Axinidae
- Genus: Allopseudaxine
- Species: A. katsuwonis

Binomial name
- Allopseudaxine katsuwonis (Ishii, 1936) Yamaguti, 1943

= Allopseudaxine katsuwonis =

Species of worms

Allopseudaxine katsuwonis is a species of monogenean flatworm, which is parasitic on the gills of a marine fish. It belongs to the family Axinidae.

== Systematics ==
Allopseudaxine katsuwonis was described from the gills of the Skipjack-tuna Katsuwonus vagans (currently named Katsuwonus pelamis) off Japan, as Pseudaxine vagans. Two years later, Ishii & Sawada gave an English description of this species. In 1943, Yamaguti proposed the new genus Allopseudaxine for Pseudaxine katsuwonis. Unnithan apparently unaware of the works of Ishii, Ishii & Sawada and Yamaguti, proposed the genus Uraxine. Subsequently, Price redescribed this species, and pointed the presence of the vaginal "gill-like" openings. He also synonymised the genus Uraxine with Allopseudaxine.

== Description ==
The body of Allopseudaxine katsuwonis comprises an anterior part attenuated in the cephalic region which contains most organs, and a posterior part called the haptor. The haptor bears a single row of 24 pedunculate clamps. The clamps of the haptor attach the animal to the gill of the fish. A lobe lappet is present, and is armed with two pairs of hooks. There are also two buccal suckers at the anterior extremity. The digestive organs include an anterior mouth, an oval pharynx, a simple oesophagus and a posterior intestine that bifurcates at or near level of genital pore in two lateral branches. The intestinal branches terminate in the distal portion of the haptor region. Each adult contains male and female reproductive organs. The reproductive organs include an anterior genital atrium armed with a corona of 14 hook-like spines, one row of dorsolateral marginal vaginae on each side of the body, each row divided into a longitudinal row of transverse slit with sclerotized margins, a slender tubular ovary and about 60 large oval testes pre, para and post-ovarian.

== Hosts and localities ==
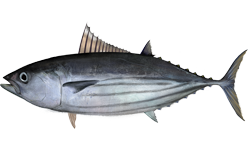
The Skipjack-tuna Katsuwonus pelamis is the type host of Allopseudaxine katsuwonis

The type-host is the Skipjack-tuna Katsuwonus vagans, (currently named Katsuwonus pelamis) (Scombridae). The type locality is off Japan. It was also recorded of Hawaii.
