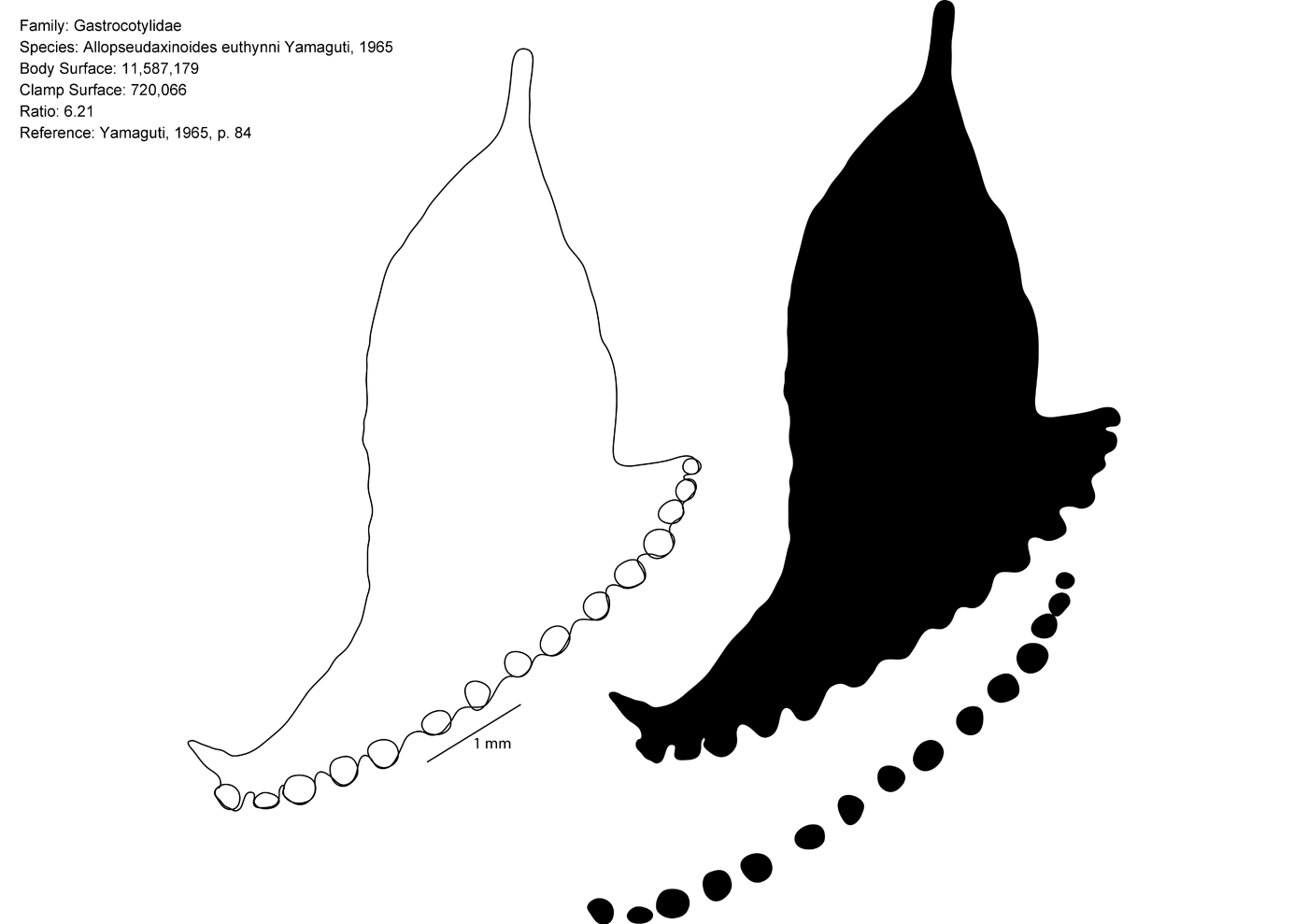
- Allopseudaxinoides euthynni

Scientific classification
- Kingdom: Animalia
- Phylum: Platyhelminthes
- Class: Monogenea
- Order: Mazocraeidea
- Family: Axinidae
- Genus: Allopseudaxinoides; Yamaguti, 1968.

= Allopseudaxinoides =

Genus of flatworms

Allopseudaxinoides is a genus which belongs to the phylum Platyhelminthes and class Monogenea; all its species are parasites of fish. It was created by Yamaguti in 1965, to include Allopseudaxinoides euthynni.

== Morphology ==
Species of Allopseudaxinoides are ectoparasites that affect their host by attaching themselves as larvae on the gills of the fish and grow into adult stage. This larval stage is called oncomiracidium, and is characterized as free swimming and ciliated. The name Allopseudaxine is composed of a root Allopseudaxine: a monogenean genus, and the suffix oides which means resembling. Thus, the name Allopseudaxinoides means resembling Allopseudaxine. In fact, species of Allopseudaxine have a large body tapering anteriorly, and a unilateral, oblique haptor, (which means that they have a single oblique row of clamps,) giving them a triangular appearance. By this triangular shape, they resemble Allopseudaxine. However, species of Allopseudaxinoides can be distinguished from Allopseudaxine by a complete absence of vaginae or the presence of rudimentary ones, the presence of thickenings of clamps capsule, and an accessory clamp sclerite.

== Species ==
Allopseudaxinoides comprises two species:

- Allopseudaxinoides euthynni Yamaguti, 1965
- Allopseudaxinoides vagans (Ishii, 1936) Yamaguti, 1968
