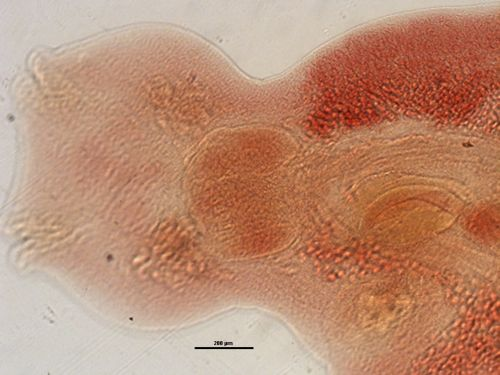
- Holotype of Acanthocotyle pacifica (Smithsonian USNM 1321941)

Scientific classification
- Kingdom: Animalia
- Phylum: Platyhelminthes
- Class: Monogenea
- Order: Gyrodactylidea
- Family: Acanthocotylidae
- Genus: Acanthocotyle; Monticelli, 1888

Species
- Acanthocotyle elegans; Acanthocotyle lobianchi

Synonyms
- Allacanthocotyla Yamaguti, 1963

= Acanthocotyle =

Genus of flatworms

Acanthocotyle is a genus of monogenean fish skin parasites.
