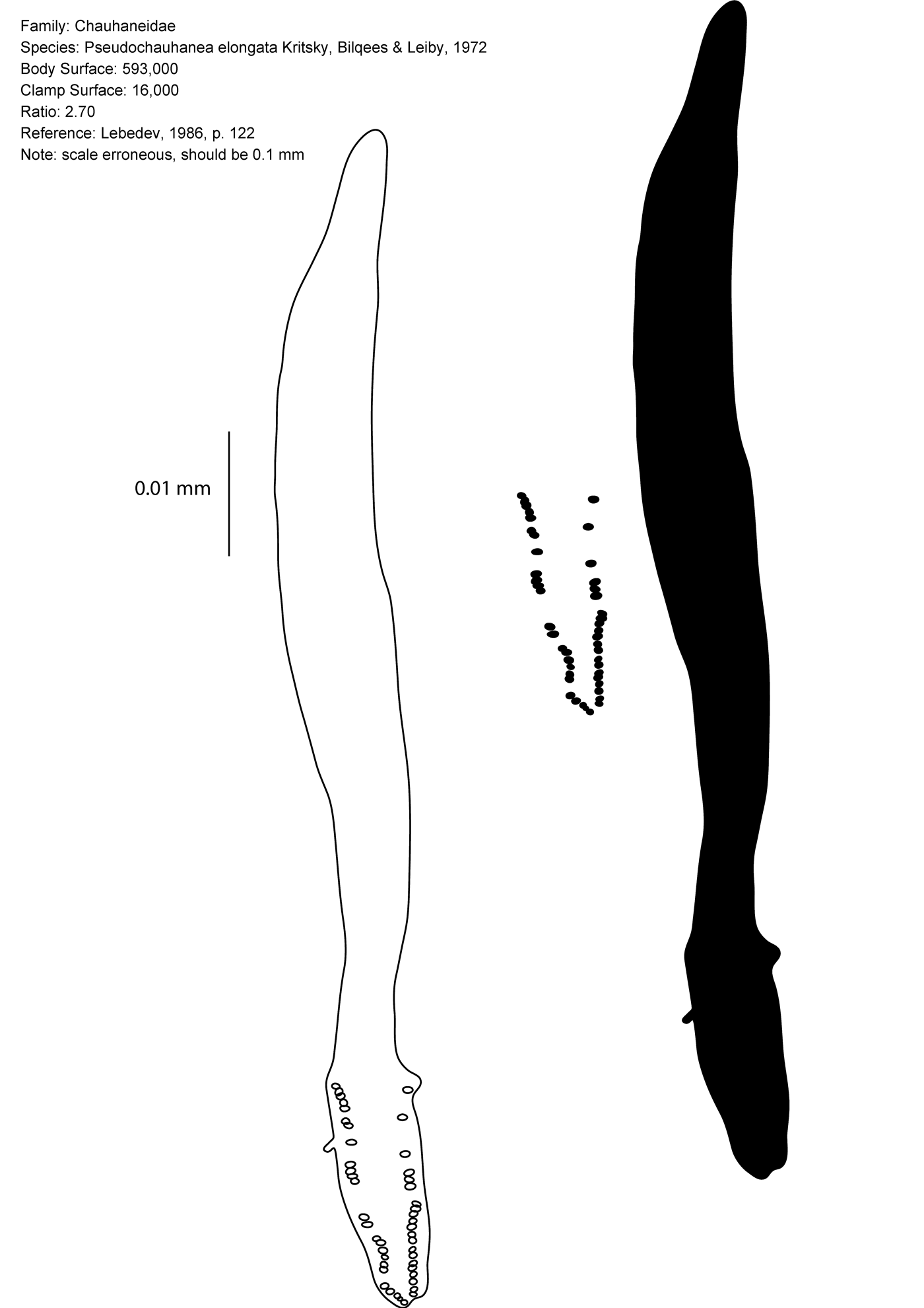
- Pseudochauhanea elongata

Scientific classification
- Kingdom: Animalia
- Phylum: Platyhelminthes
- Class: Monogenea
- Order: Mazocraeidea
- Family: Chauhaneidae
- Genus: Pseudochauhanea; Yamaguti, 1965

= Pseudochauhanea =

Genus of flatworms

Pseudochauhanea is a genus of monogeneans within the family Chauhaneidae. There are currently 5 species assigned to the genus.

== Species ==
- Pseudochauhanea elegans Fuentes-Zambrano, 1997
- Pseudochauhanea elongata Kritsky, Bilqees & Leiby, 1972
- Pseudochauhanea macrorchis Lin, Liu & Zhang in Zhang, Yang & Liu, 2001
- Pseudochauhanea mexicana Lamothe, 1967
- Pseudochauhanea sphyraenae Yamaguti, 1965
