= Discocotyle =

Scientific classification
- Kingdom: Animalia
- Phylum: Platyhelminthes
- Class: Monogenea
- Order: Mazocraeidea
- Family: Discocotylidae
- Genus: Discocotyle; Diesing, 1850

Genus of worms

Discocotyle is a genus of flatworms belonging to the family Discocotylidae.

The species of this genus are found in Europe and Northern America.

Species:

- Discocotyle ohridana Stojanovski, Hristovski, Baker, Cakic, Djikanovic, Stojanovic, Paunovic, Kulisic & Hristovski, 2005
- Discocotyle sagittata (Leuckart, 1842) Diesing, 1850
- Discocotyle salmonis
