= Plectanocotylidae =

Scientific classification
- Kingdom: Animalia
- Phylum: Platyhelminthes
- Class: Monogenea
- Order: Mazocraeidea
- Family: Plectanocotylidae; Monticelli, 1903

Family of worms

Plectanocotylidae is a family of polyopisthocotylean monogeneans. All the species in this family are parasitic on the gills of marine fish.

== Genera ==
According to the World Register of Marine Species, as of December 2018 the family includes these genera:

- Adenicola Mamaev & Parukhin, 1972
- Euzetplectanocotyle Mamaev & Tkachuk, 1979
- Inversocotyle Mamaev & Parukhin, 1972
- Octoplectanocotyla Yamaguti, 1937
- Peristedionelia Mamaev & Parukhin, 1972
- Plectanocotyle Diesing, 1850 including Plectanocotyle gurnardi, Plectanocotyle major and Plectanocotyle lastovizae
- Plectanocotyloides Euzet & Suriano, 1974
- Triglicola Mamaev & Parukhin, 1972
- Triglicoloides Mamaev & Parukhin, 1972
