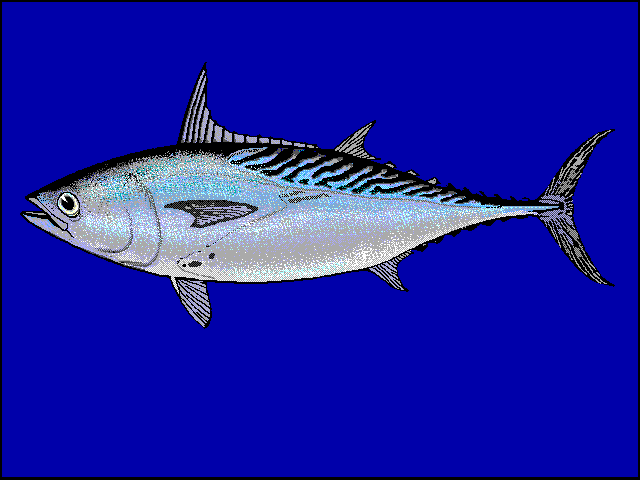
- Euthynnus affinis

Scientific classification
- Kingdom: Animalia
- Phylum: Chordata
- Class: Actinopterygii
- Order: Scombriformes
- Family: Scombridae
- Tribe: Thunnini
- Genus: Euthynnus; Lütken in Jordan and Gilbert, 1883

Type species
- Thynnus thunina Cuvier, 1829

Species
- See text

Synonyms
- Thynnichthys Giglioli, 1880; Wanderer Whitley, 1937

= Euthynnus =

Genus of fishes

Euthynnus is a genus of ray-finned bony fish in the family Scombridae, or mackerel family, and in the tribe Thunnini, more commonly known as the tunas. Species in the genus Euthynnus are also known as "little tunas," and are found in subtropical oceans worldwide. They are known for their dark red meat and strong taste compared to larger tunas.

== Species ==
Species of the genus Euthynnus
Common name	Scientific name	Maximum length	Common length	Maximum weight	Maximum age	Trophic level	Source	IUCN status
Mackerel tuna, kawakawa	E. affinis (Cantor, 1849)	110 cm 3.6 ft	60 cm 2.0 ft	15 kg 33 lb	6 years	4.50		Least concern
Little tunny, false albacore, bonita	E. alletteratus (Rafinesque, 1810)	122 cm 4.0 ft	80 cm 2.6 ft	16.5 kg 36 lb	10 years	4.13		Least concern
Black skipjack tuna	E. lineatus (Kishinouye, 1920)	92 cm 3.0 ft	60 cm 2.0 ft	11.8 kg 26 lb		3.83		Least concern

== See also ==
- List of prehistoric bony fish
