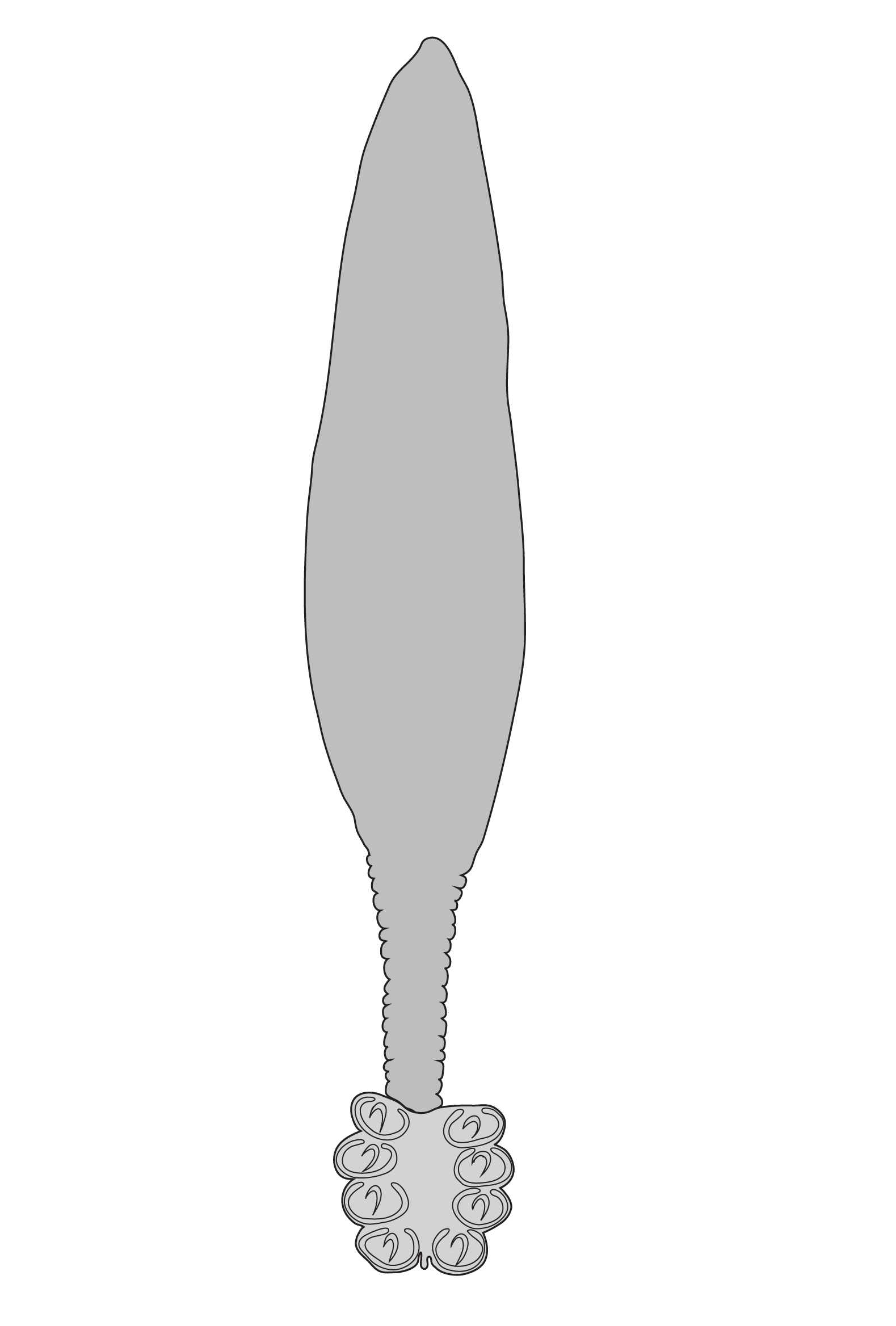
- Chimaericola leptogaster

Scientific classification
- Domain: Eukaryota
- Kingdom: Animalia
- Phylum: Platyhelminthes
- Class: Monogenea
- Order: Chimaericolidea
- Family: Chimaericolidae
- Genus: Chimaericola; Brinkmann, 1942

= Chimaericola =

Genus of flatworms

Chimaericola is a genus of parasitic flatworms in the family Chimaericolidae. The genus was created by August Brinkmann in 1942. Species are parasitic on the gills of chimaeras.

== Species ==
According to the World Register of Marine Species, only three species are known in this genus:

- Chimaericola colliei Beverley-Burton, Chisholm & Last, 1991
- Chimaericola leptogaster (Leuckart, 1830)
- Chimaericola ogilbyi Beverley-Burton, Chisholm & Last, 1991
