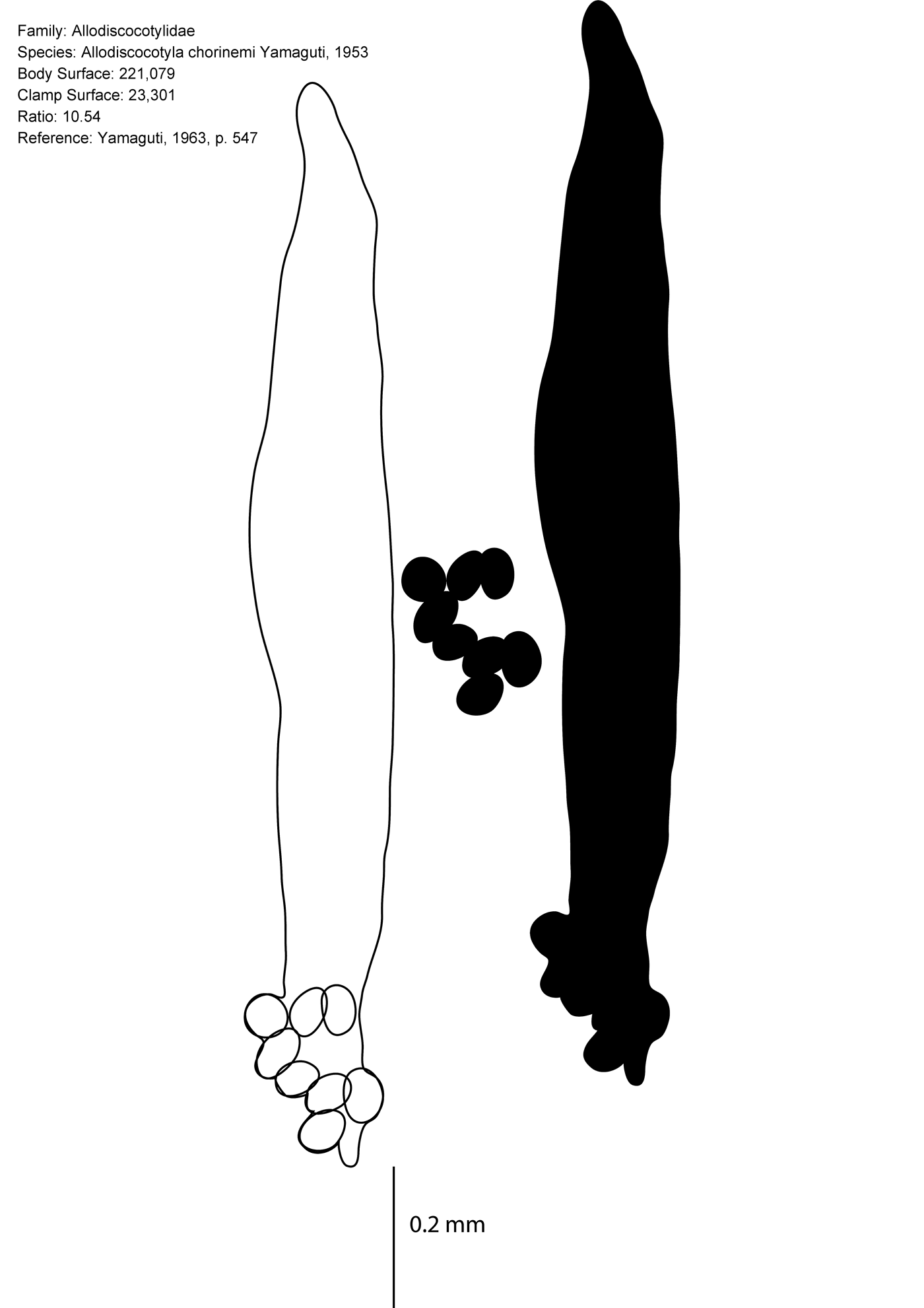
- Allodiscocotyla chorinemi

Scientific classification
- Kingdom: Animalia
- Phylum: Platyhelminthes
- Class: Monogenea
- Order: Mazocraeidea
- Family: Allodiscocotylidae; Tripathi, 1959

= Allodiscocotylidae =

Family of flatworms

Allodiscocotylidae is a family of monogeneans within the order Mazocraeidea, containing 6 genera. Members of this family primarily host species of fish, such as Allodiscocotyla chorinemi hosting Scomberoides lysan.

== Genera ==
- Allodiscocotyla Yamaguti, 1953
- Camopia Lebedev, 1970
- Hargicola Lebedev, 1970
- Metacamopia Lebedev, 1972
- Metacamopiella Kohn, Santos & Lebedev, 1996
- Vallisia Parona & Perugia, 1890
