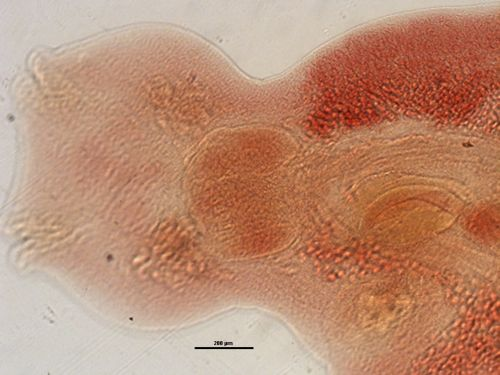
- Holotype of Acanthocotyle pacifica (Smithsonian USNM 1321941)

Scientific classification
- Kingdom: Animalia
- Phylum: Platyhelminthes
- Class: Monogenea
- Order: Gyrodactylidea
- Family: Acanthocotylidae; Monticelli, 1903

Genera
- Acanthocotyle; Lophocotyle; Myxinidocotyle; Pseudacanthocotyla

Synonyms
- Acanthocotylinae Monticelli, 1903; Allacanthocotylinae Yamaguti, 1963; Lophocotylinae Yamaguti, 1963; Pseudacanthocotylinae Yamaguti, 1963

= Acanthocotylidae =

Family of flatworms

Acanthocotylidae is a family of parasitic flatworms in the class monogenea, a group of mostly external fish parasites.
