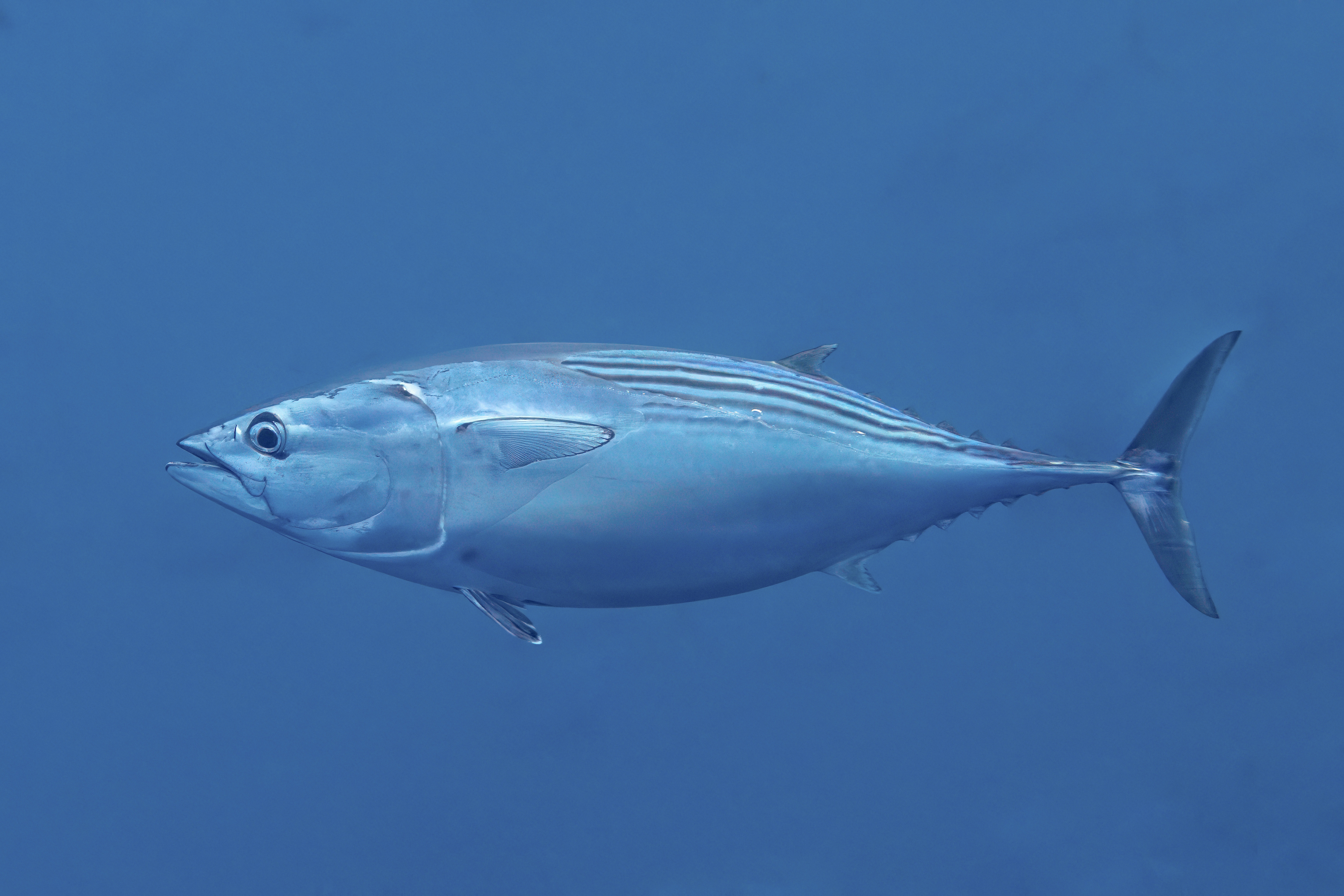
- Euthynnus lineatus

Conservation status
- Least Concern (IUCN 3.1)

Scientific classification
- Kingdom: Animalia
- Phylum: Chordata
- Class: Actinopterygii
- Order: Scombriformes
- Family: Scombridae
- Genus: Euthynnus
- Species: E. lineatus

Binomial name
- Euthynnus lineatus Kishinouye, 1920

= Euthynnus lineatus =

Black skipjack tuna

Species of fish

Euthynnus lineatus, the black skipjack tuna or black skipjack, is a species of ray-finned bony fish in the family Scombridae. It belongs to the tribe Thunnini, better known as the tunas. It is in the genus Euthynnus of "little tunas" which includes the little tunny from the Atlantic Ocean and kawakawa, from the Indo-Pacific Ocean, which also shares some range with the black skipjack.

== Description ==
E. lineatus has a total of 10-15 spines in its dorsal fins with the anterior spines of the first dorsal fin being much taller than the middle spines which gives this fin a concave outline. The anal fin has 11 - 12 soft rays and it has a vertebra count of 37. Its body is almost entirely scaleless except for the lateral line and a "corselet", and there is no swim bladder. It is generally iridescent blue in colour with black markings on its back made up of 3 to 5 horizontal stripes, as well as a variable amount of black or dark grey spots above the pelvic fins. Occasional specimens have extensive longitudinal stripes of light grey on their belly while other individuals have few or no such markings. After death, the lines are often no longer prominent, but can still be distinguished by the 2 or more spots over the pelvic fins.

E. lineatus can reach up to 92 centimetres (36 in) and a weight up to 11.6 kilograms (26 lb).

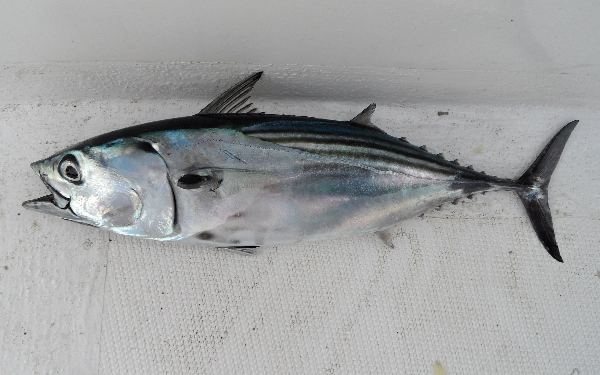
A specimen of Euthynnus lineatus

== Distribution ==
Eastern tropical Pacific from San Simeon, California to northern Peru and the Galápagos Islands.

== Fisheries ==
No targeted fishery exists for this species, though it is taken incidentally in the course of other fishery operations. Like the closely related little tunny, its meat is regarded as subpar due to it being very bloody and red, and is often thrown back.

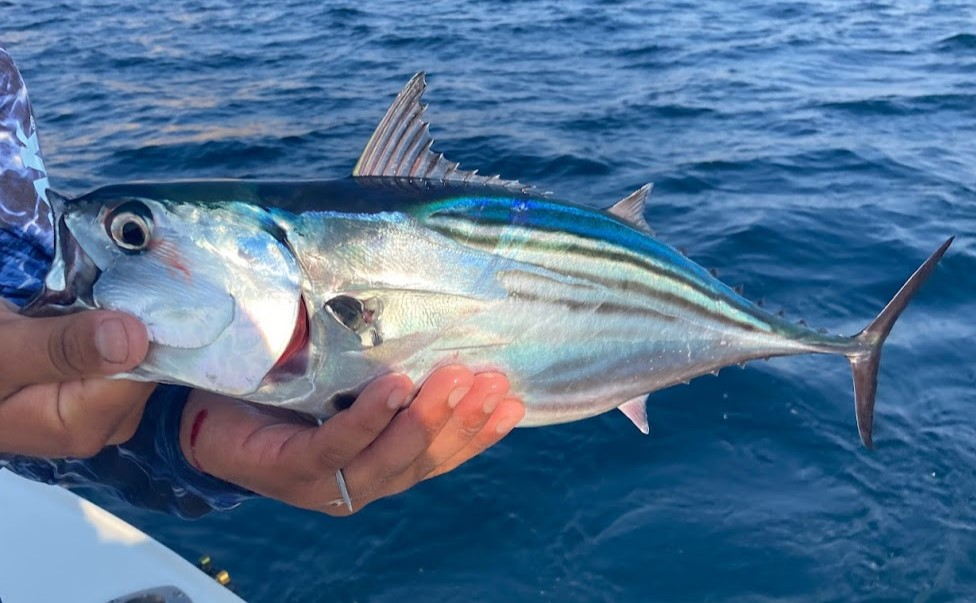
A small black skipjack tuna caught in Southern Baja California. Notice the two dots near the gill to distinguish it from a true skipjack tuna

== Biology ==
E. lineatus is a pelagic and oceanodromous species which is rarely recorded where the surface temperature falls below 23 °C (73 °F). The larvae are most commonly found at temperatures higher than 26 °C (79 °F). It is generally distributed in surface waters which are no more than 386 kilometres (240 miles) from land. E. lineatus will form multi-species schools other scombridaes like the yellowfin tuna and skipjack tuna. It shows opportunistic predatory behavior, sharing its feeding pattern with other tunas, as well as dolphins and other large predatory fish, with which it also competes. Like other tunas, the fish breaths through ram ventilation, so it must continue swimming to intake oxygen.

The spawning of this species has a wide geographical and temporal distribution, and in the eastern tropical Pacific it has been shown to occur over a wide area from coastal to oceanic waters.
