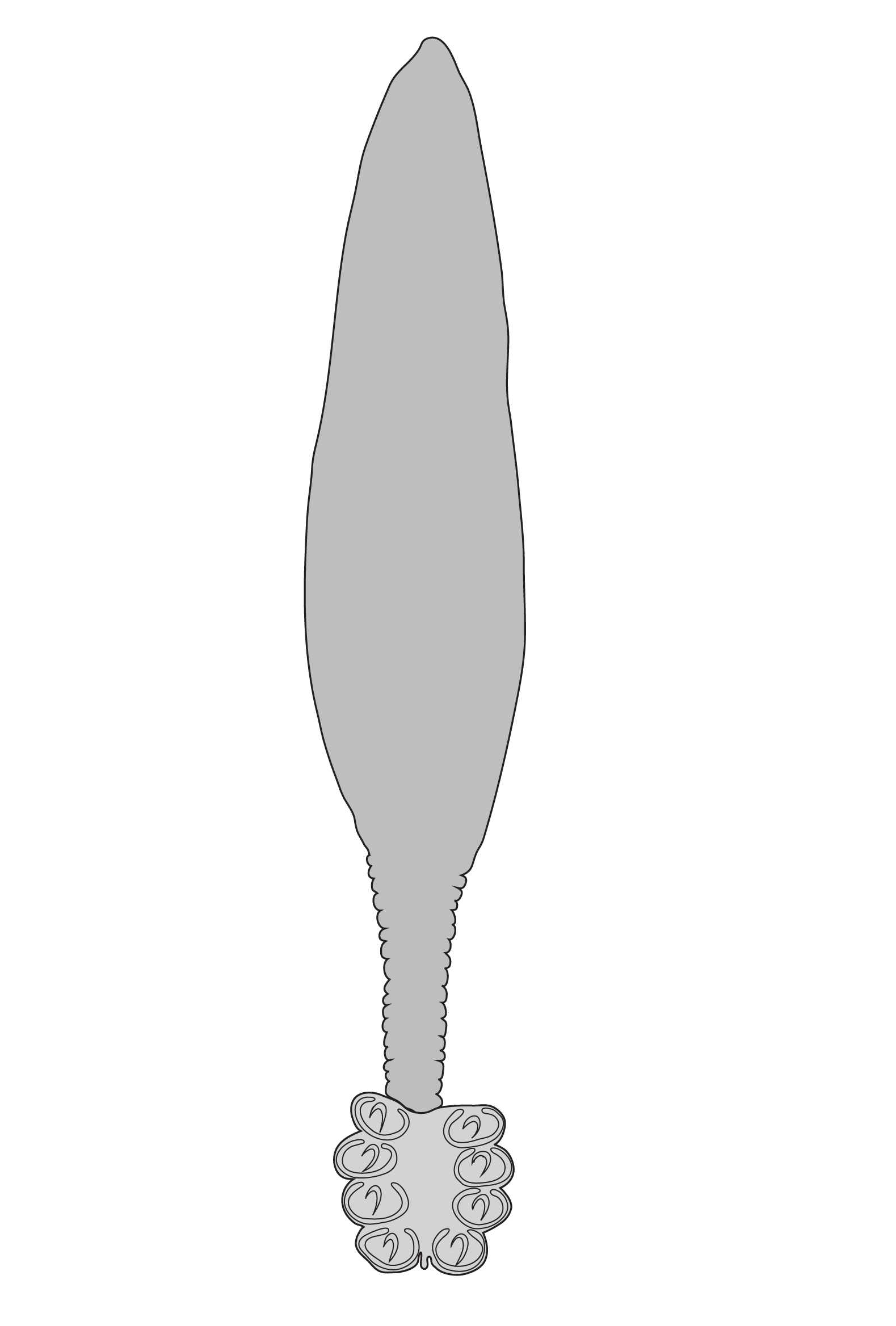

Scientific classification
- Kingdom: Animalia
- Phylum: Platyhelminthes
- Class: Monogenea
- Subclass: Polyopisthocotylea
- Order: Chimaericolidea
- Family: Chimaericolidae; Brinkmann, 1942

Genera
- See text

= Chimaericolidae =

Family of flatworms

Chimaericolidae is a family of monogenean parasites. The family was named by Brinkmann in 1942.

Species of Chimaericolidae are parasites of chimaeras.

== Genera ==
According to the World Register of Marine Species, only two genera are included in the family:

- Callorhynchicola Brinkmann, 1952
- Chimaericola Brinkmann, 1942
