= Discocotylidae =

Scientific classification
- Kingdom: Animalia
- Phylum: Platyhelminthes
- Class: Monogenea
- Order: Mazocraeidea
- Family: Discocotylidae; Price, 1936

Family of worms

Discocotylidae is a family of flatworms belonging to the order Mazocraeidea.

Genera:

- Allocotylophora Dillon & Hargis, 1965
- Anthocotyle Van Beneden & Hesse, 1863
- Bicotylophora Price, 1936
- Discocotyle Diesing, 1850
- Pseudobicotylophora Amato, 1994
- Pseudodiscocotyla Yamaguti, 1965
