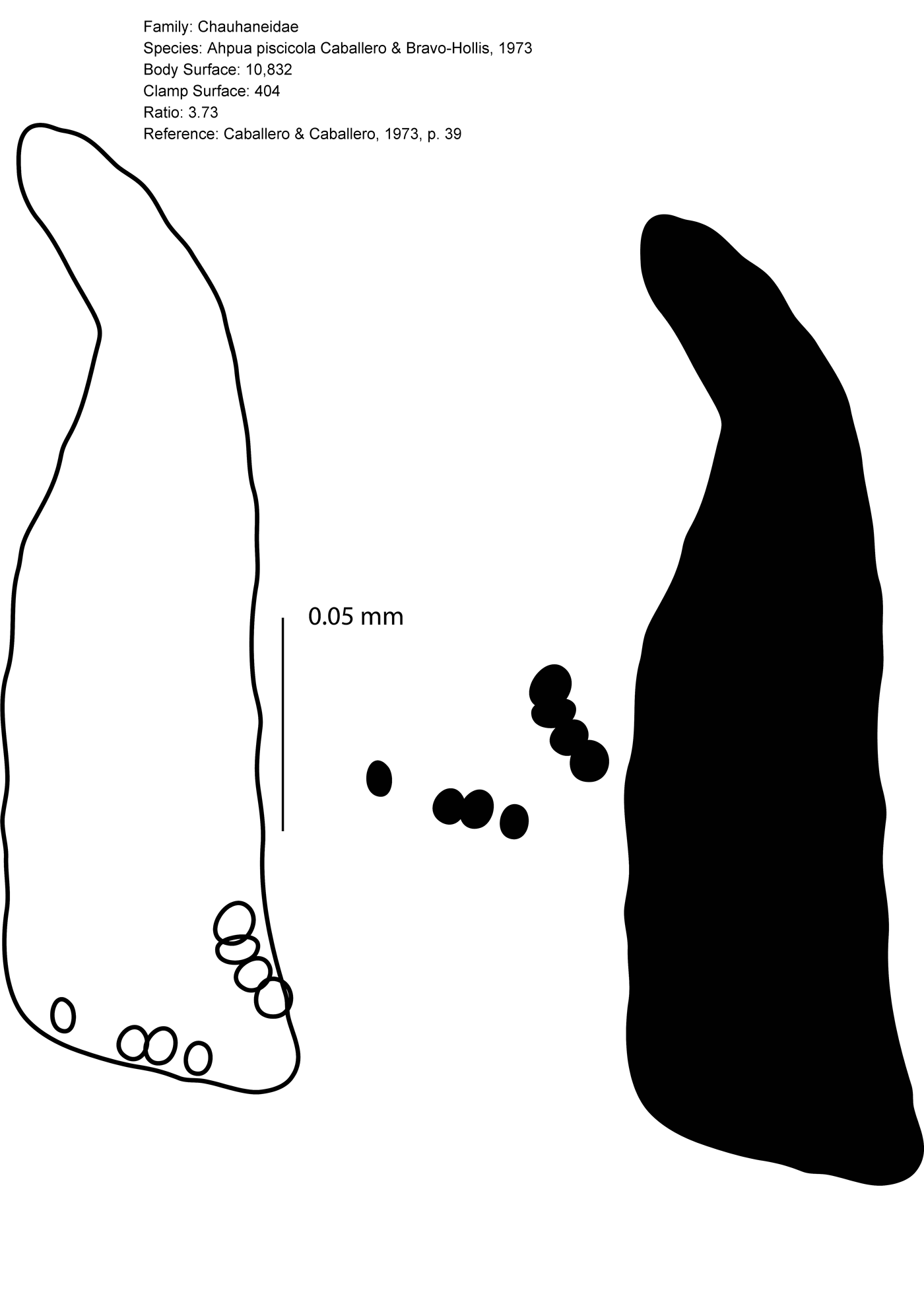
- Ahpua piscicola

Scientific classification
- Kingdom: Animalia
- Phylum: Platyhelminthes
- Class: Monogenea
- Order: Mazocraeidea
- Family: Chauhaneidae; Euzet & Trilles, 1960

= Chauhaneidae =

Family of flatworms

Chauhaneidae is a family of monogeneans within the order Mazocraeidea. There are currently 17 genera assigned to the family.

== Genera ==
- Ahpua Caballero & Bravo-Hollis, 1973
- Allopseudopisthogyne Yamaguti, 1965
- Caniongiella Lebedev, 1976
- Chauhanea Ramalingam, 1953
- Cotyloatlantica Bravo-Hollis, 1984
- Gemmaecaputia Tripathi, 1959
- Metopisthogyne Yamaguti, 1966
- Oaxacotyle Lebedev, 1984
- Opisthogyne Unnithan, 1962
- Paracaniongiella Lebedev, 1976
- Paragemmaecaputia Ramalingam, 1960
- Pentatres Euzet & Razarihelisoa, 1959
- Pseudochauhanea Yamaguti, 1965
- Pseudomazocraes Caballero & Bravo Hollis, 1955
- Pseudopisthogyne Yamaguti, 1965
- Pseudopisthogynopsis Yamaguti, 1965
- Salinacotyle Lebedev, 1984
