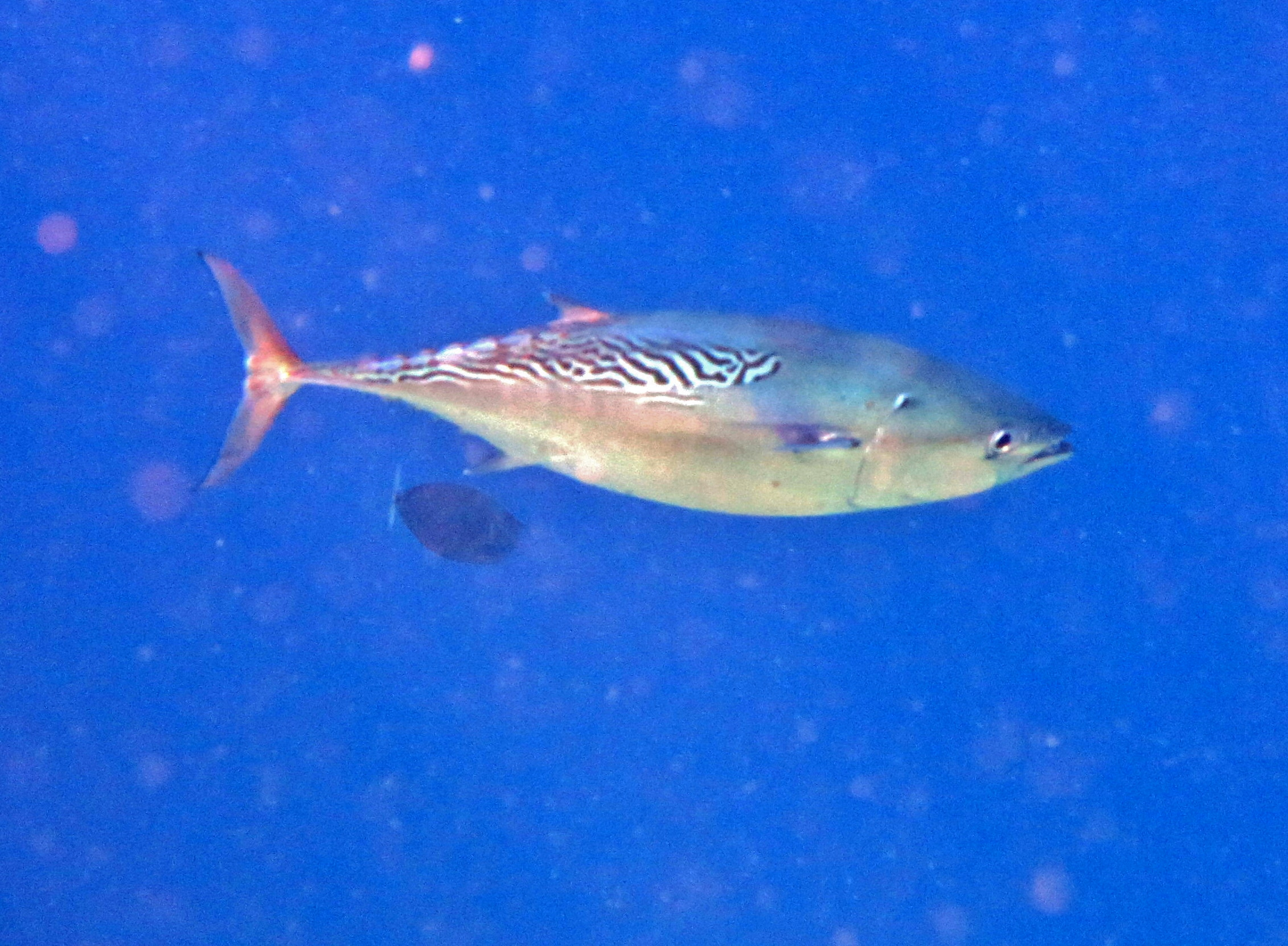

Conservation status
- Least Concern (IUCN 3.1)

Scientific classification
- Kingdom: Animalia
- Phylum: Chordata
- Class: Actinopterygii
- Order: Scombriformes
- Family: Scombridae
- Genus: Euthynnus
- Species: E. affinis

Binomial name
- Euthynnus affinis (Cantor, 1849)

Synonyms
- Thynnus affinis Cantor, 1849; Euthynnus yaito Kishinouye, 1915; Wanderer wallisi Whitley, 1937; Euthunnus wallisi (Whitley, 1937)

= Euthynnus affinis =

Kawakawa

Species of fish

Global capture production of Kawakawa (Euthynnus affinis) in thousand tonnes from 1950 to 2022, as reported by the FAO

Euthynnus affinis, the mackerel tuna, little tuna, eastern little tuna, wavyback skipjack tuna, kawakawa, or tongkol komo is a species of ray-finned bony fish in the family Scombridae, or mackerel family. It belongs to the tribe Thunnini, better known as the tunas. It is also in the genus Euthynnus of "little tunas," which includes the little tunny and the black skipjack.

Euthynnus affinis formerly was known as Euthynnus yaito.

== Description ==
E. Affinis displays a typical tuna body shape with a slender, elongated body, and a deeply forked tail. It has a small amount of scales and 2 or more dark spots between the pelvic and pectoral fins. The first dorsal fin has 10-15 spines and is around 1/3rd of the tuna's body height. On its back, it displays 12 oblique stripes and a dark blue coloration for countershading. It can reach a maximum length of 1.1 metres (3.6 ft) and a weight up to 15 kilograms (33 lb).

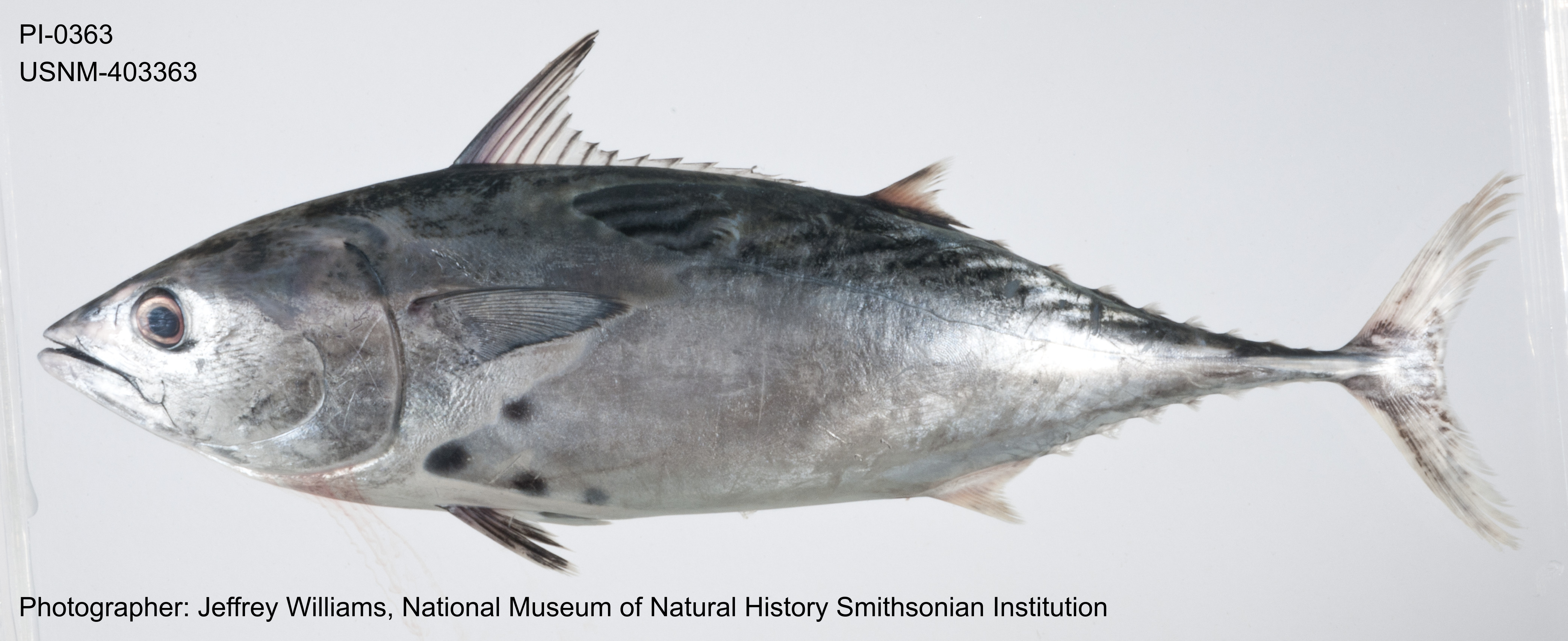
A specimen of Euthynnus affinis from the Smithsonian Institution

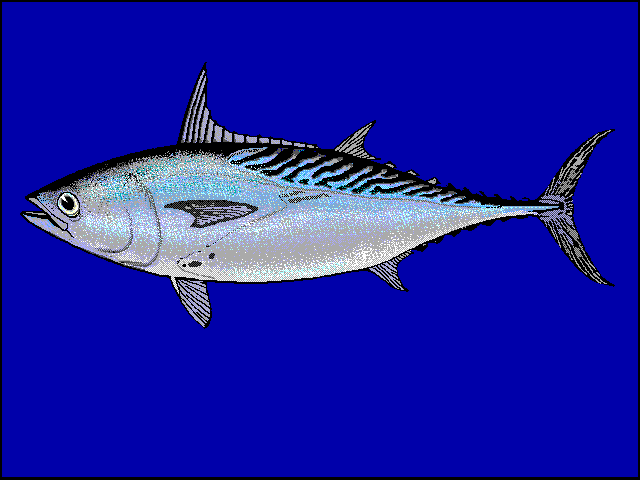
Illustration of E. affinis

To distinguish from the closely related black skipjack, also of the Pacific Ocean, the kawakawa has more broken stripes instead of straight stripes spanning the side of the body on the black skipjack. The stripes on the back of the kawakawa are more orderly than those of the little tunny, which is primary found in the Atlantic Ocean.

== Distribution and ecology ==
E. Affinis is an Indo-Pacific species which is found from the Red Sea to French Polynesia, but can also be found near Baja California.

The kawakawa is a pelagic, highly migratory species, often schooling from the surface of the water to depths of 200 metres (660 ft). However, it often sticks close to coastal structures and neritic shelves instead of the open ocean. It is also known to commonly inhabit coastal reefs and move into estuaries. It prefers waters ranging from 18–29 °C (64–84 °F).

It is a highly opportunistic feeder, eating squid, fish, crustaceans, and zooplankton. Like other tuna species, it will often form large, multi-species schools with other scombridaes like the yellowfin tuna and frigate mackerel.

Predators of E. affinis include larger tuna, billfish, sharks, birds, and marine mammals.

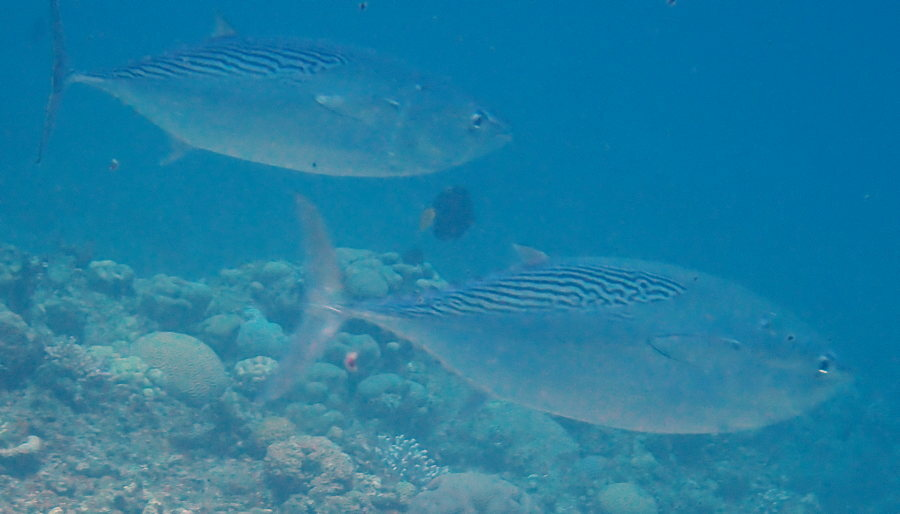
E. affinis near a coral reef in the Red Sea.

== Fisheries ==
While often being seen as an undesirable fish like others in its genus due to its strong taste and dark red meat, it is commonly eaten in Hawaiian and Oceanic cultures, as well as being used in sashimi. The kawakawa is also caught in large amounts in the indo-pacific region, and is canned and sold frozen for human consumption. It is also commonly used for pet food.

Due to it being a reef-frequenting species, there is a possibility of ciguatera poisoning.
