= Francesco Saverio Monticelli =

Italian zoologist

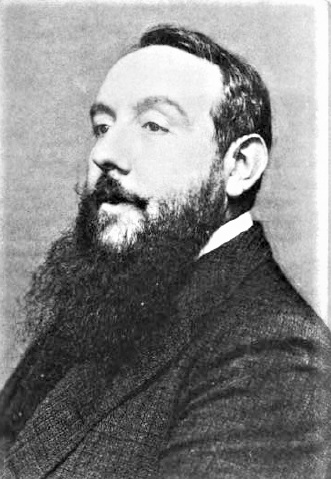
Francesco Saverio Monticelli

Francesco Saverio Monticelli (1863–1927) was an Italian zoologist at the Zoological Museum of Naples (curator from 1900).

He was the taxonomic author of several families of parasites which are still recognized, such as the Diplectanidae Monticelli, 1903 or the Plectanocotylidae Monticelli, 1903.

== Taxa named by Monticelli ==
- Category:Taxa named by Francesco Saverio Monticelli

== Bibliography ==
- Monticelli, F.S. (1888) Saggio di una morfologia dei Trematodi. Google Books
- Monticelli, F.S. (1892) Cotylogaster Michaelis n g n sp. e revisione degli Aspidobothridae. HathiTrust Digital Library
- Monticelli, F.S. (1893) Studii sui Trematodi endoparassiti: Primo contributo di osservazioni sui distomidi. PDF in BHL
- Monticelli, F.S. (1903) Per una nuova classificazione degli “Heterocotylea”. Monitore Zoologico Italiano, 14, 334–336.
