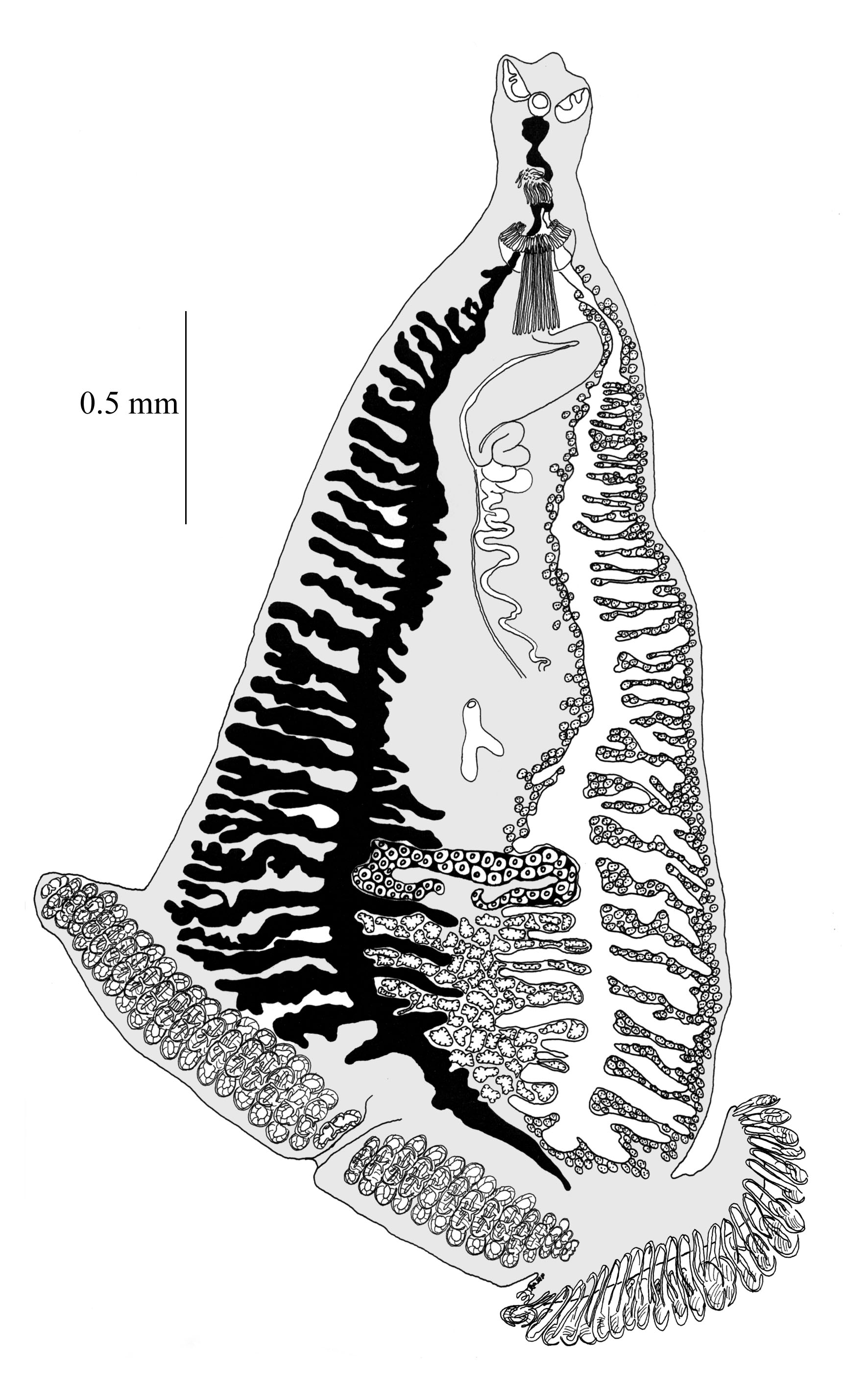
- Heteromicrocotyloides megaspinosus (Heteromicrocotylidae)

Scientific classification
- Kingdom: Animalia
- Phylum: Platyhelminthes
- Class: Monogenea
- Subclass: Polyopisthocotylea
- Order: Mazocraeidea; Bykhovsky, 1957

Families
- See text

= Mazocraeidea =

Order of worms

Mazocraeidea is an order of flatworms in the subclass Polyopisthocotylea within the class Monogenea.

The species of this order have various structures in the clamps of their posterior attachment organ, including additional sclerites in the Gastrocotylidae and related families. However, these additional sclerites, and even the clamps themselves, are lacking in certain members of the family Protomicrocotylidae.

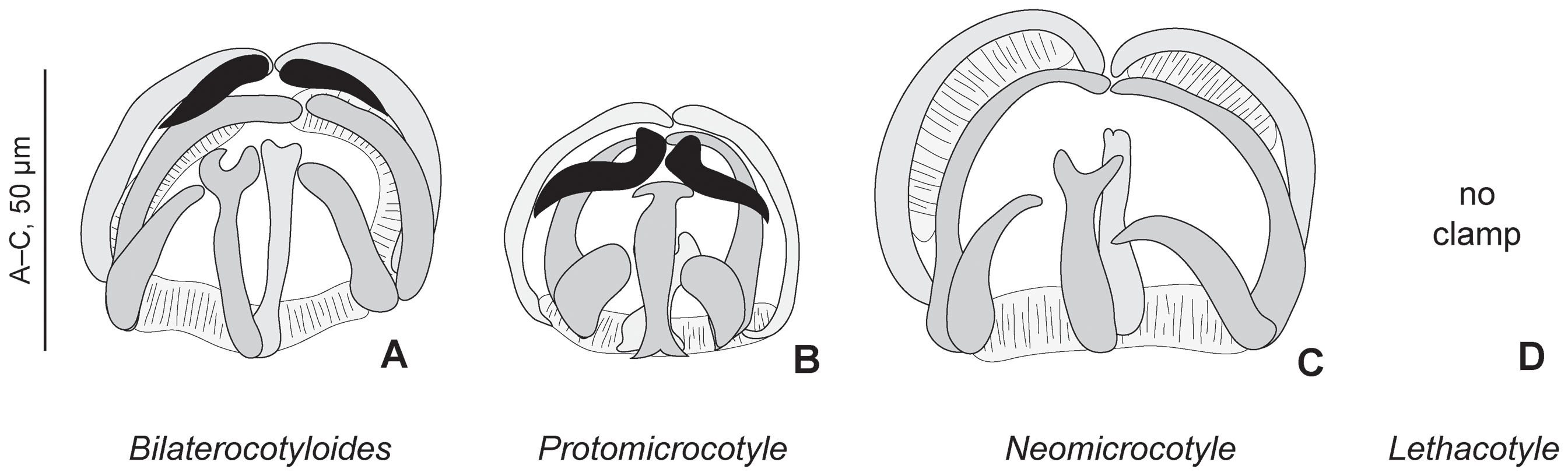
Clamps in various genera of Protomicrocotylidae. Black: additional sclerite, characteristic of the Mazocraeidea

== Families ==
According to PESI:

- Anthocotylidae Bychowsky, 1957
- Axinidae Monticelli, 1903
- Chauhaneidae Euzet & Trilles, 1960
- Diclidophoridae Fuhrmann, 1928
- Diplozoidae
- Discocotylidae Price, 1936
- Gotocotylidae Yamaguti, 1963
- Heteraxinidae Unnithan, 1957
- Hexostomatidae Price, 1936
- Mazocraeidae Price, 1936
- Microcotylidae Taschenberg, 1879
- Octolabeidae
- Plectanocotylidae Monticelli, 1903
- Protomicrocotylidae Johnston & Tiegs, 1922
- Pyragraphoridae Yamaguti, 1963

According to the World Register of Marine Species:

- Allodiscocotylidae
- Allopyragraphoridae
- Anchorophoridae
- Anthocotylidae
- Axinidae
- Bychowskicotylidae
- Chauhaneidae
- Diclidophoridae
- Diplozoidae
- Discocotylidae
- Gastrocotylidae
- Gotocotylidae
- Heteraxinidae
- Heteromicrocotylidae
- Hexostomatidae
- Macrovalvitrematidae
- Mazocraeidae
- Megamicrocotylidae
- Microcotylidae
- Monaxinoididae
- Neothoracocotylidae
- Octolabeidae
- Paramonaxinidae
- Plectanocotylidae
- Protomicrocotylidae
- Pseudodiclidophoridae
- Pterinotrematidae
- Pyragraphoridae
- Thoracocotylidae
