= Branchiostegus saitoi =

Scientific classification
- Kingdom: Animalia
- Phylum: Chordata
- Class: Actinopterygii
- Order: Acanthuriformes
- Family: Latilidae
- Genus: Branchiostegus
- Species: B. saitoi

Binomial name
- Branchiostegus saitoi Dooley & Iwatsuki, 2012

Species of ray-finned fish

Branchiostegus saitoi, is a species of marine ray-finned fish, a tilefish belonging to the family Malacanthidae. It is found in the Philippines. This species reaches a length of 32.9 cm (13.0 in).
