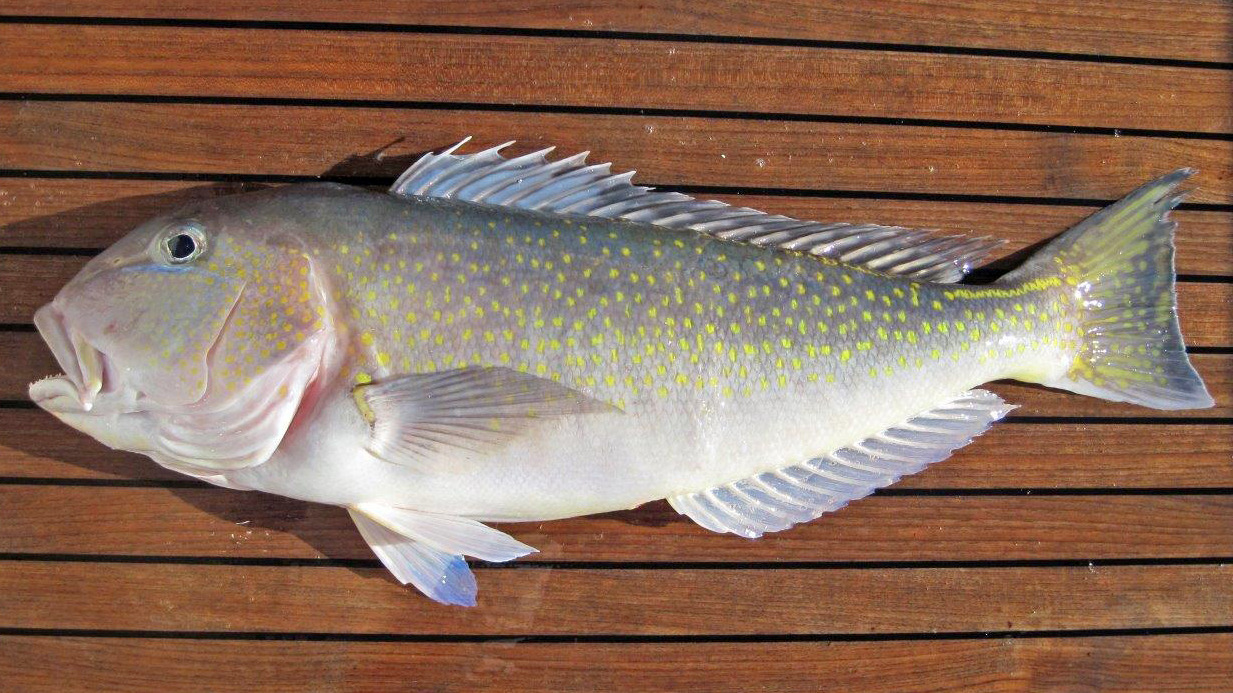

Scientific classification
- Kingdom: Animalia
- Phylum: Chordata
- Class: Actinopterygii
- Order: Acanthuriformes
- Family: Latilidae
- Genus: Lopholatilus
- Species: L. villarii

Binomial name
- Lopholatilus villarii Miranda-Ribeiro, 1915

Synonyms
- Lopholatilus abbreviatus Lahille, 1930

= Lopholatilus villarii =

Species of ray-finned fish

Lopholatilus villarii, the tilefish, is a species of marine ray-finned fish, a tilefish belonging to the family Malacanthidae. It is native to the western South Atlantic Ocean off the coasts of Brazil, Uruguay and Argentina. This species was first formally described in 1915 by the Brazilian naturalist Alpilio de Miranda Ribeiro (1874-1939) with the type locality given as Praca do Mercado, Brazil. The specific name honours the Brazilian naval captain Frederico Otávio de Lemos Villar (1875-1964) who participated in fisheries research off Brazil.
