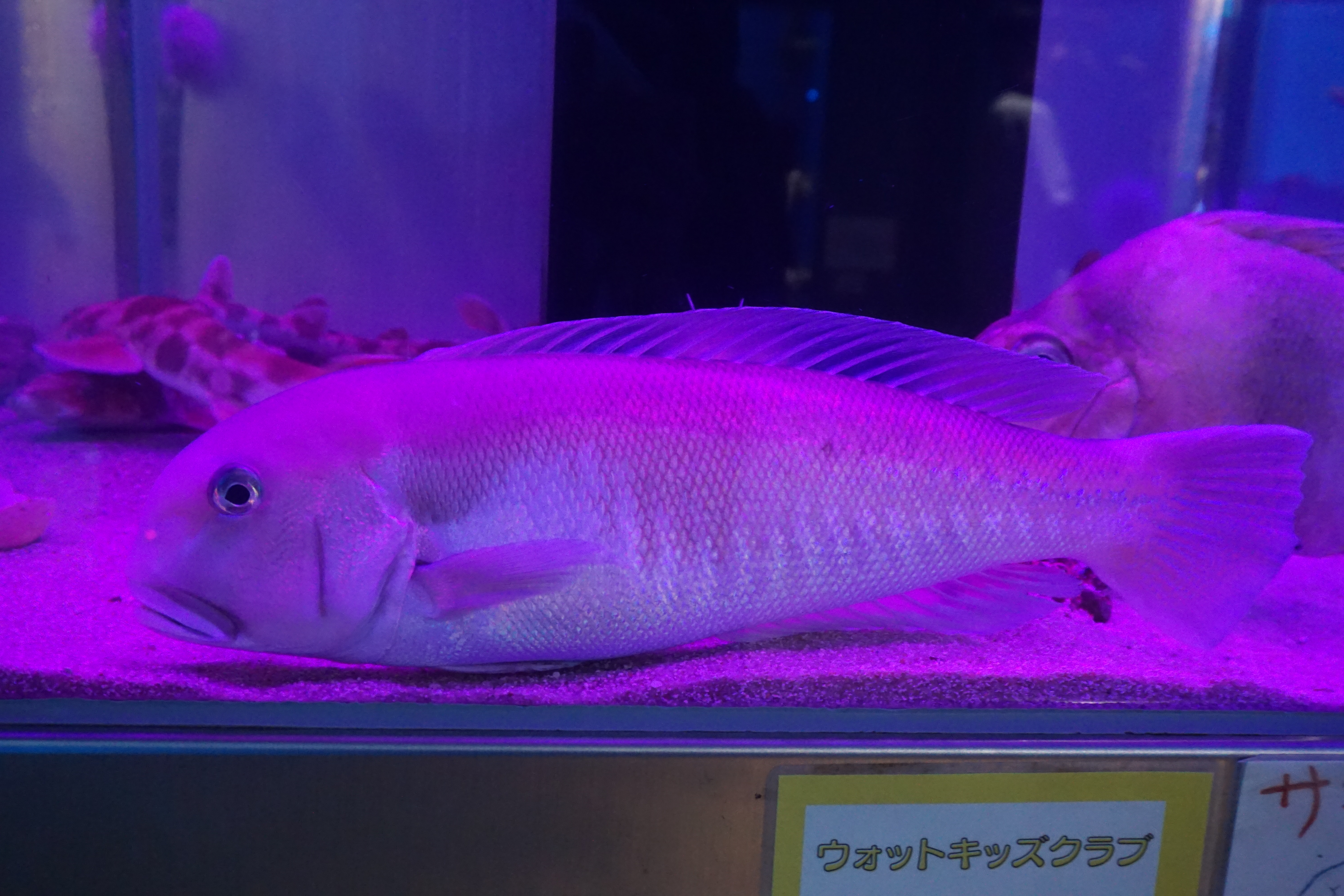

Scientific classification
- Kingdom: Animalia
- Phylum: Chordata
- Class: Actinopterygii
- Order: Acanthuriformes
- Family: Latilidae
- Genus: Branchiostegus
- Species: B. albus

Binomial name
- Branchiostegus albus Dooley, 1978

= Branchiostegus albus =

Species of ray-finned fish

Branchiostegus albus, is a species of marine ray-finned fish, a tilefish belonging to the family Malacanthidae. It is native to the Northwest Pacific, from southern Japan to the East China Sea. This species reaches a length of 45 cm (18 in).
