= Branchiostegus serratus =

Scientific classification
- Kingdom: Animalia
- Phylum: Chordata
- Class: Actinopterygii
- Order: Acanthuriformes
- Family: Latilidae
- Genus: Branchiostegus
- Species: B. serratus

Binomial name
- Branchiostegus serratus Dooley & Paxton, 1975

Species of ray-finned fish

Branchiostegus serratus, the Australian barred tilefish, is a species of marine ray-finned fish, a tilefish belonging to the family Malacanthidae. It is found in eastern Australia. This species reaches a length of 28.5 cm (11.2 in).
