= Branchiostegus auratus =

Scientific classification
- Kingdom: Animalia
- Phylum: Chordata
- Class: Actinopterygii
- Order: Acanthuriformes
- Family: Latilidae
- Genus: Branchiostegus
- Species: B. auratus

Binomial name
- Branchiostegus auratus (Kishinouye, 1907)

Species of ray-finned fish

Branchiostegus auratus is a species of marine ray-finned fish, a tilefish belonging to the family Malacanthidae. It is found in the Western Pacific, from southern Japan and also in the East China Sea. This species reaches a length of 30 cm (12 in).
