= Lopholatilus ereborensis =

Lopholatilus ereborensis Temporal range: 16 Ma Miocene

Scientific classification
- Kingdom: Animalia
- Phylum: Chordata
- Class: Actinopterygii
- Order: Acanthuriformes
- Family: Latilidae
- Genus: Lopholatilus
- Species: †L. ereborensis

Binomial name
- †Lopholatilus ereborensis Carnevale & Godfrey, 2014

Extinct species of ray-finned fish

Lopholatilus ereborensis is an extinct species of tilefish found in formations at Calvert Cliffs State Park in Lusby, Maryland. The species lived in the Salisbury Embayment in the Western North Atlantic during the Miocene era, 16 million years ago. The species is believed to have dug long, funnel-shaped vertical burrows in the continental shelf, the collapse of which may account for the remarkable preservation of the fossils. The species measured 18 inches (46 cm) long. The name is derived from "Erebor", the Elvish name for the Lonely Mountain from J.R.R. Tolkien's The Hobbit.
