= Branchiostegus biendong =

Scientific classification
- Kingdom: Animalia
- Phylum: Chordata
- Class: Actinopterygii
- Order: Acanthuriformes
- Family: Latilidae
- Genus: Branchiostegus
- Species: B. biendong

Binomial name
- Branchiostegus biendong Hiramatsu, Vinh, Endo, 2019

Species of ray-finned fish

Branchiostegus biendong is a species of marine ray-finned fish, a tilefish belonging to the family Malacanthidae. It is found in Vietnam.
