= Branchiostegus australiensis =

Scientific classification
- Kingdom: Animalia
- Phylum: Chordata
- Class: Actinopterygii
- Order: Acanthuriformes
- Family: Latilidae
- Genus: Branchiostegus
- Species: B. australiensis

Binomial name
- Branchiostegus australiensis Dooley & Kailola, 1988

Species of ray-finned fish

Branchiostegus australiensis, the Australian tilefish, is a species of marine ray-finned fish, a tilefish belonging to the family Malacanthidae. It is found in the Indo-West Pacific, from off of Sumatra, Indonesia to Shark Bay, in Western Australia. This species reaches a length of 26.6 cm (10.5 in).
