= Branchiostegus okinawaensis =

Scientific classification
- Kingdom: Animalia
- Phylum: Chordata
- Class: Actinopterygii
- Order: Acanthuriformes
- Family: Latilidae
- Genus: Branchiostegus
- Species: B. okinawaensis

Binomial name
- Branchiostegus okinawaensis Hiramatsu & Yoshino, 2012

Species of ray-finned fish

Branchiostegus okinawaensis is a species of marine ray-finned fish, a tilefish belonging to the family Malacanthidae. It is found in Okinawa.
