= Branchiostegus ilocanus =

Scientific classification
- Kingdom: Animalia
- Phylum: Chordata
- Class: Actinopterygii
- Order: Acanthuriformes
- Family: Latilidae
- Genus: Branchiostegus
- Species: B. ilocanus

Binomial name
- Branchiostegus ilocanus Herre, 1928

Species of ray-finned fish

Branchiostegus ilocanus is a species of marine ray-finned fish, a tilefish belonging to the family Malacanthidae. It is found around the Philippines. This species reaches a length of 27 cm (11 in).
