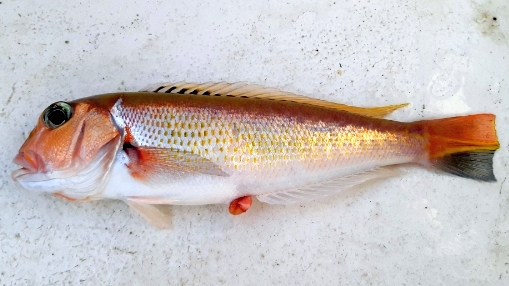

Scientific classification
- Kingdom: Animalia
- Phylum: Chordata
- Class: Actinopterygii
- Order: Acanthuriformes
- Family: Latilidae
- Genus: Branchiostegus
- Species: B. sawakinensis

Binomial name
- Branchiostegus sawakinensis Amirthalingam, 1969

= Branchiostegus sawakinensis =

Species of ray-finned fish

Branchiostegus sawakinensis, the freckled tilefish, is a species of marine ray-finned fish, a tilefish belonging to the family Malacanthidae. It is native to the Indo-West Pacific area. From the Red Sea and south off Durban, South Africa. Also reported from the Arafura Sea, found in northwestern Australia and around the Philippines. This species reaches a length of 45 cm (18 in).
