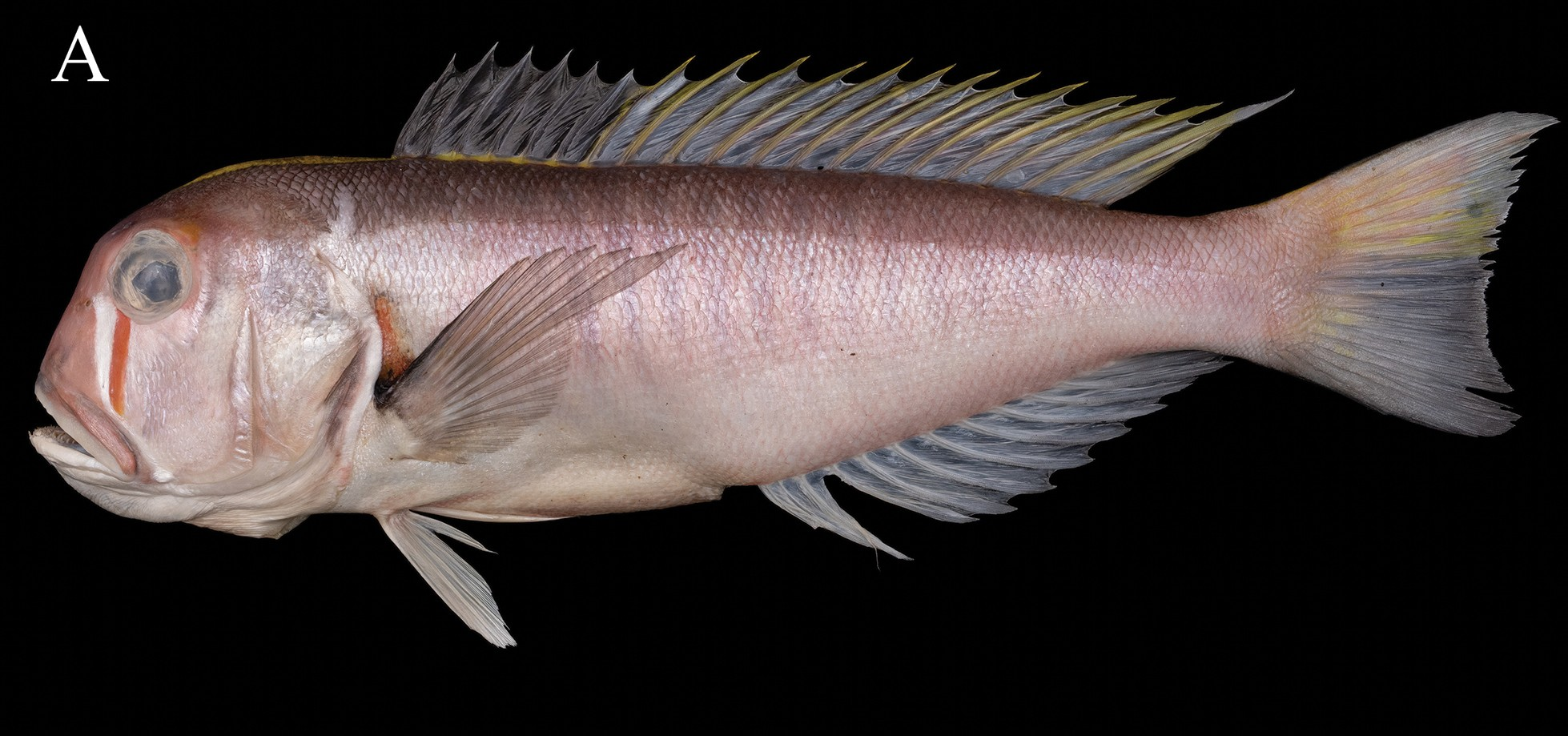

Scientific classification
- Kingdom: Animalia
- Phylum: Chordata
- Class: Actinopterygii
- Order: Acanthuriformes
- Family: Latilidae
- Genus: Branchiostegus
- Species: B. sanae

Binomial name
- Branchiostegus sanae Huang, Chen, Ke & Zhang, 2025
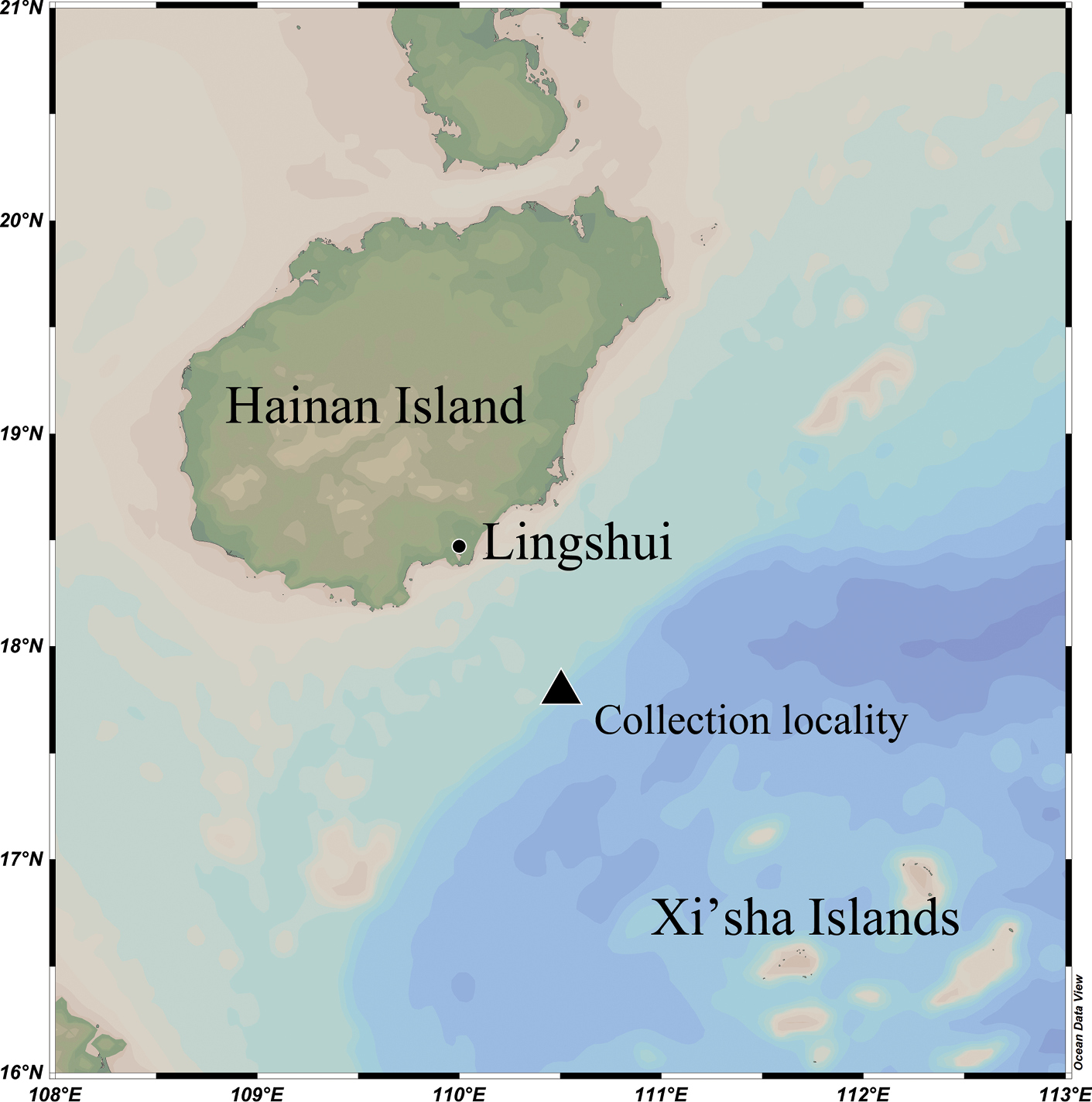
- Known locality marked with a black triangle

= Branchiostegus sanae =

Species of fish

Branchiostegus sanae, the Mononoke tilefish, is a species of marine ray-finned fish in the family Malacanthidae. It is currently only known from a single location in the South China Sea, off the southern coast of Hainan. It can be easily told apart from other members of its genus by the presence of white and red vertical stripes between the eye and the mouth, and faint vertical stripes along the body. It is named after the character San from the Japanese animated film Princess Mononoke.

== Discovery and naming ==
In 2021, the original authors of the species noticed tilefish in online seafood markets with a distinctive red and white cheek stripe. In March 2023, they bought specimens of the fish and cross-referenced the original location they were fished from. The fish were described as the new species Branchiostegus sanae in January, 2025.

The specific epithet sanae honors San, the protagonist of the 1997 Japanese animated film Princess Mononoke by Hayao Miyazaki. The original authors chose the name because the red and white cheek stripes of Branchiostegus sanae resemble San's face paint. Additionally, the fishermen who sell the species refer to it as "鬼马头鱼" (ghost horsehead fish), which led the original authors to draw a correlation to the Japanese definition of "Mononoke", a type of malevolent spirit.

== Description ==
Branchiostegus sanae is overall plum-colored, with the underside lighter than the upper side. It can be easily distinguished from other tilefish by the presence of white and red lateral stripes stretching between the outer bottom edge of the eye to the mouth, and the presence of approximately light 16 vertical stripes along the body. Its size ranges from 325-416 mm in length.

== Biology ==
Very little is known about the biology of Branchiostegus sanae. It is currently only known from market-bought specimens caught between Hainan and the Paracel Islands, at a depth of 150-300 m.
