= Branchiostegus vittatus =

Scientific classification
- Kingdom: Animalia
- Phylum: Chordata
- Class: Actinopterygii
- Order: Acanthuriformes
- Family: Latilidae
- Genus: Branchiostegus
- Species: B. vittatus

Binomial name
- Branchiostegus vittatus Herre, 1926

Species of ray-finned fish

Branchiostegus vittatus is a species of marine ray-finned fish, a tilefish belonging to the family Malacanthidae. It is found around Manila in the Philippines. This species reaches a length of 24 cm (9.4 in).
