= Branchiostegus argentatus =

Scientific classification
- Kingdom: Animalia
- Phylum: Chordata
- Class: Actinopterygii
- Order: Acanthuriformes
- Family: Latilidae
- Genus: Branchiostegus
- Species: B. argentatus

Binomial name
- Branchiostegus argentatus (G. Cuvier, 1830)

Synonyms
- Latilus argentatus Cuvier, 1830; Coryphaena sinensis Lacepède, 1801; Latilus tollardi Chabanaud, 1924; Branchiostegus tollardi (Chabanaud, 1924); Branchiostegus tollarai (Chabanaud, 1924); Branchiostegus sericus Herre, 1935

Species of ray-finned fish

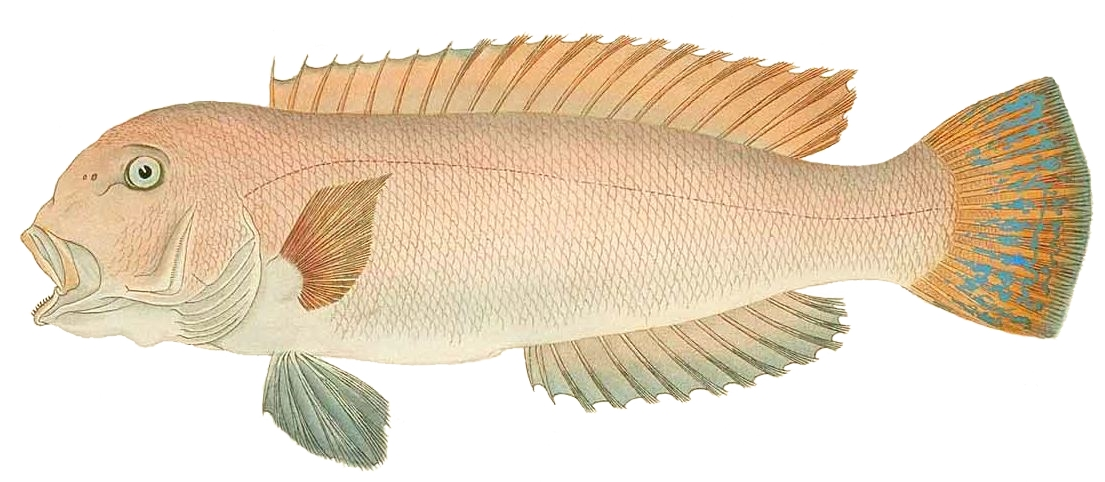
Branchiostegus argentatus

Branchiostegus argentatus is a species of marine ray-finned fish, a tilefish belonging to the family Malacanthidae. It is from the East and South China seas. This species reaches a length of 27.3 cm (10.7 in).
