= Branchiostegus gloerfelti =

Scientific classification
- Kingdom: Animalia
- Phylum: Chordata
- Class: Actinopterygii
- Order: Acanthuriformes
- Family: Latilidae
- Genus: Branchiostegus
- Species: B. gloerfelti

Binomial name
- Branchiostegus gloerfelti Dooley & Kailola, 1988

Species of ray-finned fish

Branchiostegus gloerfelti, the Australian tilefish, is a species of marine ray-finned fish, a tilefish belonging to the family Malacanthidae. So far it has only been found in the southwest Sumatra to Bali Strait in Indonesia. This species reaches a length of 25.5 cm (10.0 in).

== Etymology ==
The fish is named in honor of fisheries consultant Thomas Gloerfelt-Tarp.
