= Branchiostegus doliatus =

Scientific classification
- Kingdom: Animalia
- Phylum: Chordata
- Class: Actinopterygii
- Order: Acanthuriformes
- Family: Latilidae
- Genus: Branchiostegus
- Species: B. doliatus

Binomial name
- Branchiostegus doliatus (G. Cuvier, 1830)

Synonyms
- Latilus doliatus Cuvier, 1830

Species of ray-finned fish

Branchiostegus doliatus, the ribbed tilefish, is a species of marine ray-finned fish, a tilefish belonging to the family Malacanthidae. It is found in the Western Indian Ocean: including Maputo, from Mozambique to Durban, South Africa; and also in Mauritius and Reunion islands; and off Madagascar. This species reaches a length of 40.0 cm (15.7 in).
