= Branchiostegus semifasciatus =

Scientific classification
- Kingdom: Animalia
- Phylum: Chordata
- Class: Actinopterygii
- Order: Acanthuriformes
- Family: Latilidae
- Genus: Branchiostegus
- Species: B. semifasciatus

Binomial name
- Branchiostegus semifasciatus (Norman, 1931)

Synonyms
- Latilus semifasciatus Norman, 1931

Species of ray-finned fish

Branchiostegus semifasciatus is a species of marine ray-finned fish, a tilefish belonging to the family Malacanthidae. It is from the Eastern Atlantic, from Casablanca, Morocco to Baia dos Tigres, Angola. They are spotted rarely north of Dakar, Senegal. This species reaches a length of 60 cm (24 in).
