= Branchiostegus paxtoni =

Scientific classification
- Kingdom: Animalia
- Phylum: Chordata
- Class: Actinopterygii
- Order: Acanthuriformes
- Family: Latilidae
- Genus: Branchiostegus
- Species: B. paxtoni

Binomial name
- Branchiostegus paxtoni Dooley & Kailola, 1988

Species of ray-finned fish

Branchiostegus paxtoni, or Paxton's tilefish, is a species of marine ray-finned fish, a tilefish belonging to the family Malacanthidae. It is found in the Eastern Indian Ocean and is known only from a locality 190 km northwest of Port Hedland, Western Australia. This species reaches a length of 25.5 cm (10.0 in).

== Etymology ==
The fish is named in honor of ichthyologist John R. Paxton (b. 1938), with the Australian Museum in Sydney.
