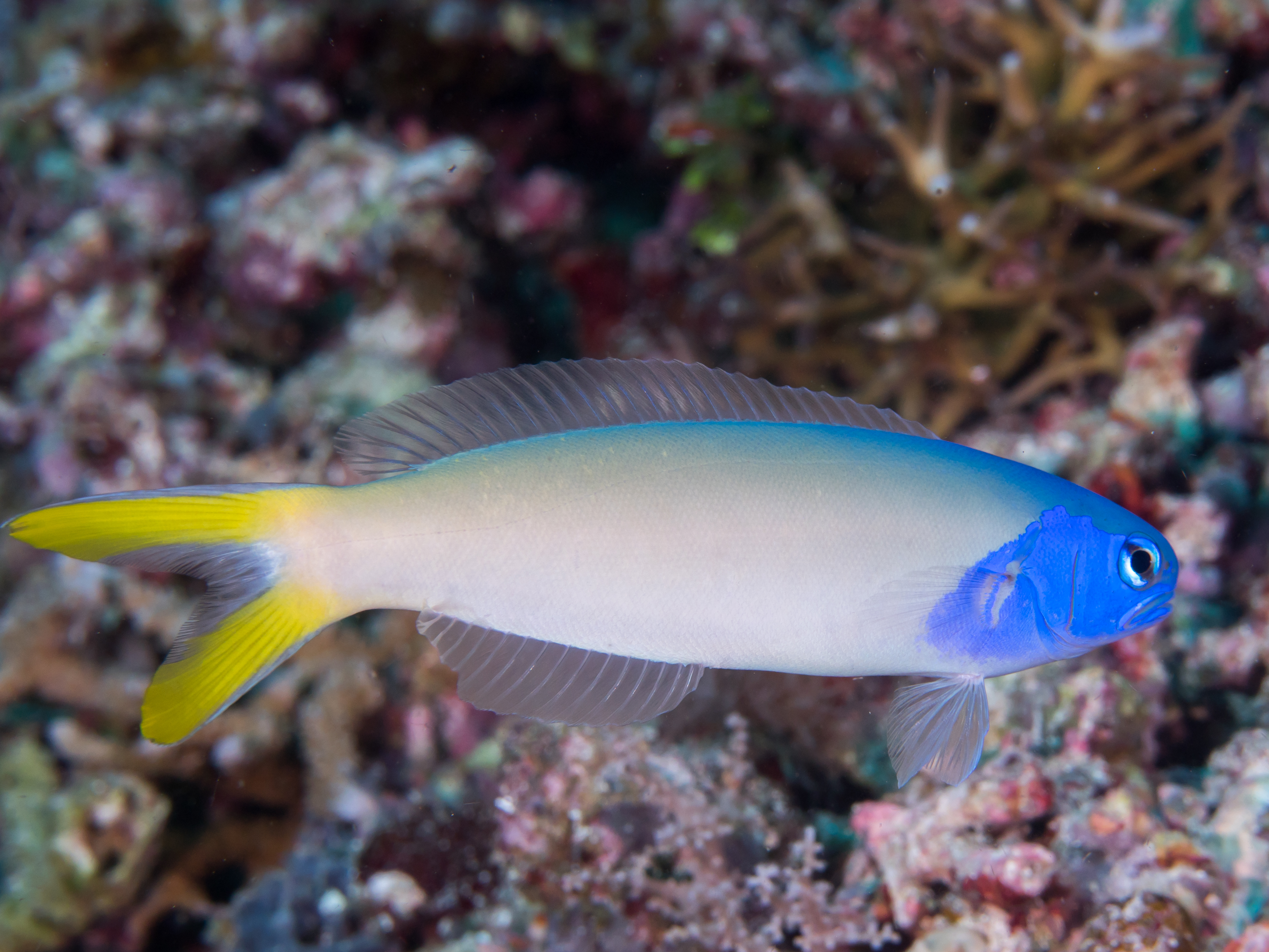

Scientific classification
- Kingdom: Animalia
- Phylum: Chordata
- Class: Actinopterygii
- Division: Teleostei
- Order: Acanthuriformes
- Family: Malacanthidae
- Genus: Hoplolatilus
- Species: H. starcki

Binomial name
- Hoplolatilus starcki J. E. Randall & Dooley, 1974

= Hoplolatilus starcki =

Species of fish

Hoplolatilus starcki, Stark's tilefish, purple-headed sand tilefish or bluehead tilefish, is a species of marine ray-finned fish, a tilefish belonging to the family Malacanthidae. This species is native to the central Indo-Pacific.

== Description ==
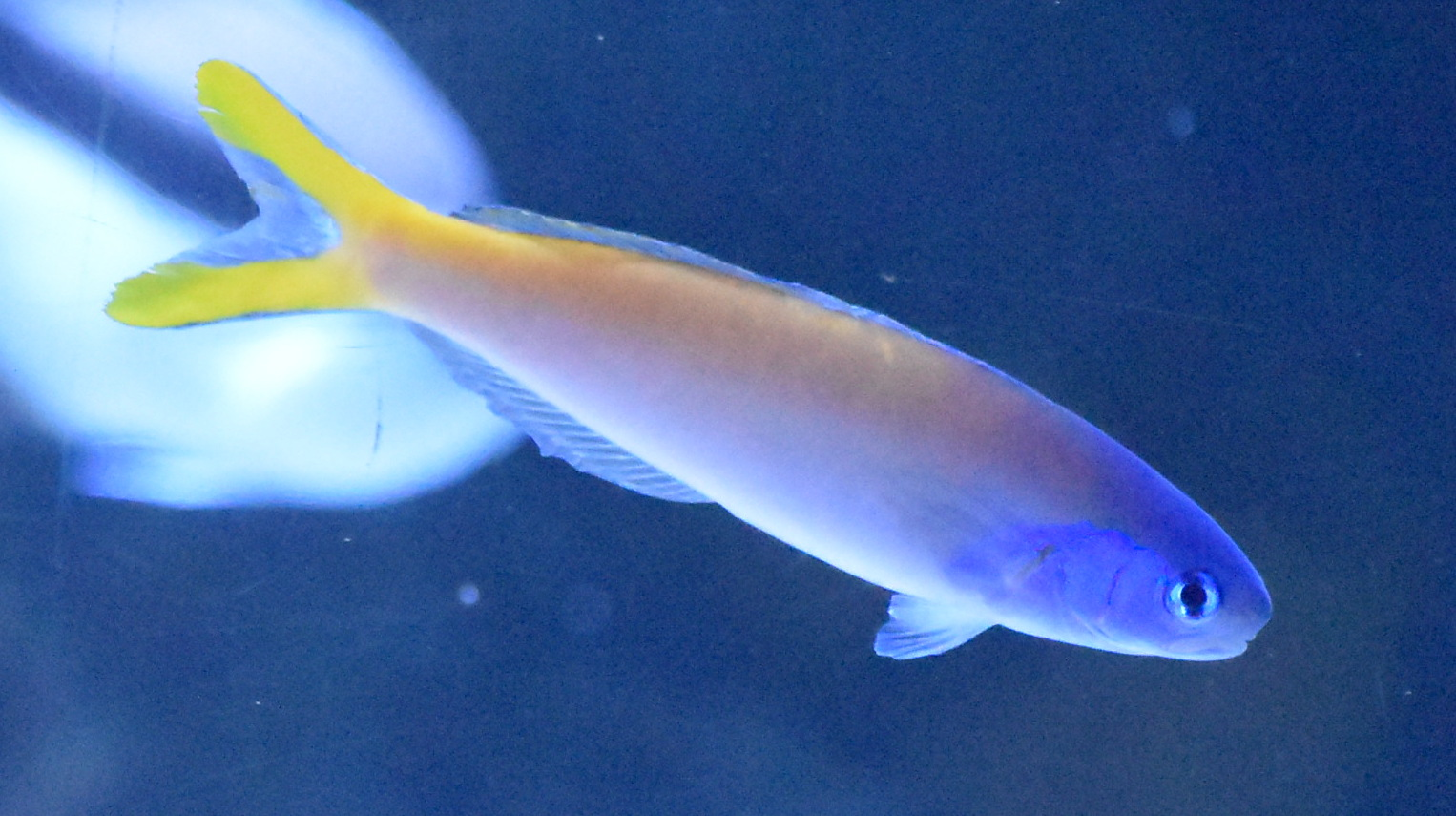
At the Georgia Aquarium

Hoplolatilus starcki has a thin, elongated body, reaching a maximum total length of 15.5 cm (6.1 in). The adults are yellowish-brown to greenish changing to yellow posteriorly. The lobes of the caudal fin are wide and yellow in colour while the head and the bases of the pectoral fins are vivid blue. The juveniles are overall sky blue in colour. The dorsal fin contains 8 spines and 21–23 soft rays while the anal fin has 2 spines and 15–16 soft rays. the caudal fin is forked.

== Distribution ==
Hoplolatilus starcki is found in the Indo-West Pacific where its range extends from Bali in Indonesia, the Philippines and Timor, north to the Marianas Islands south to Australia and New Caledonia and east to Micronesia. It has been recorded at Pitcairn Island. In Australia this species can be found at Rowley Shoals, the Great Barrier Reef and reefs in the Coral Sea.

== Habitat and biology ==
Hoplolatilus starcki is normally found in areas of scree and rubble on the steep outer reef slopes. They live in pairs which have a burrow to which they rapidly escape, diving headfirst into it, if spooked. The juveniles have been recorded schooling alongside the juvenile amethyst anthias (Pseudanthis osculum), which have a similar colouration. It prefers depths between 20 and 105 m (66 and 344 ft). It feeds on zooplankton.

== Systematics ==
Hoplolatilus starcki was first formally described in 1974 by the American ichthyologists John E. Randall (1924-2020) and James K. Dooley with the type locality given as outside of the fringing reef off northwestern Cocos Island, Guam, Mariana Islands, at a depth of 23 m (75 ft).

== Etymology ==
The specific name honours the American marine biologist Dr Walter A Starck II.

== Utilisation ==
Hoplolatilus starcki is occasionally found in the aquarium trade.
