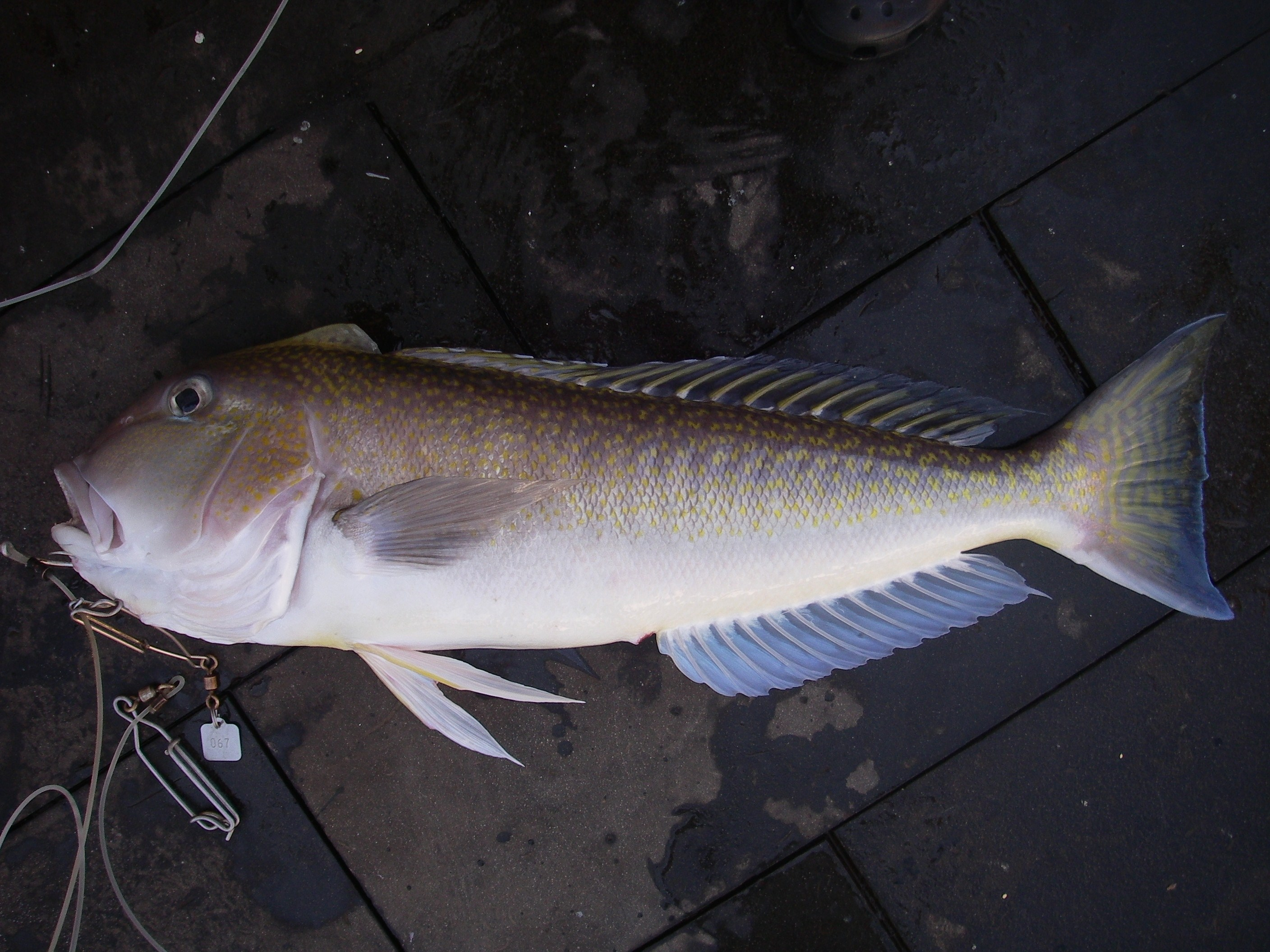
- Great northern tilefish (L. chamaeleonticeps)
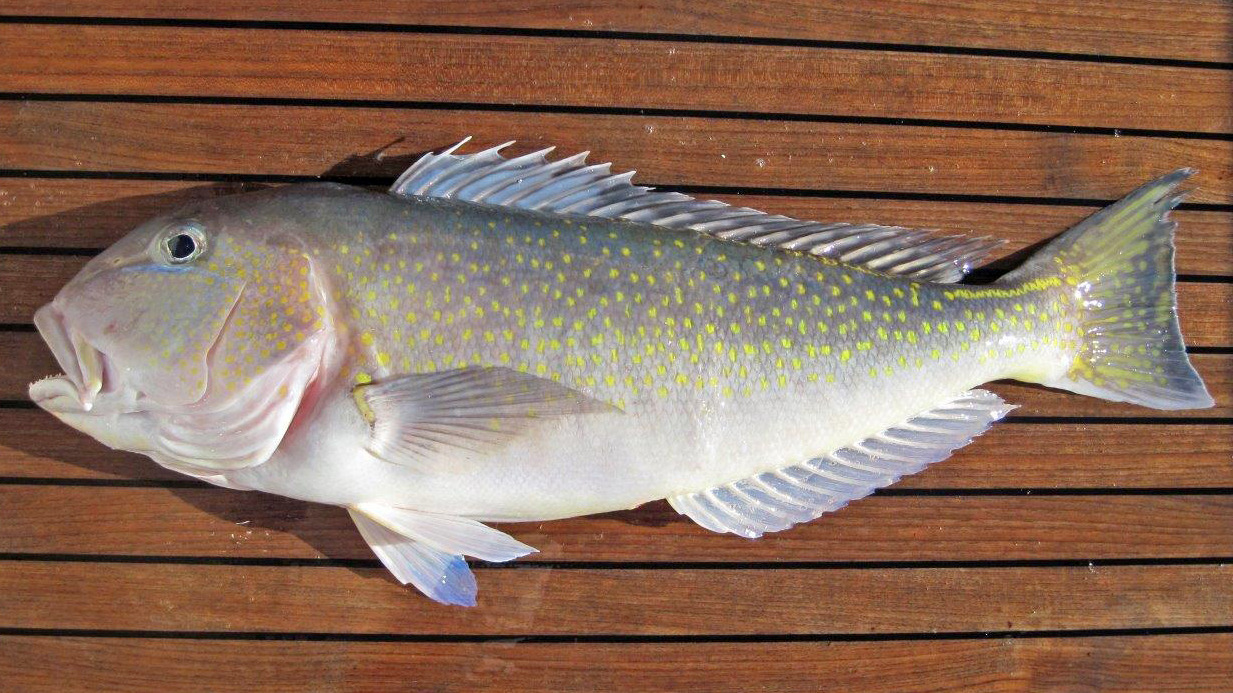
- Tilefish (L. villarii)

Scientific classification
- Kingdom: Animalia
- Phylum: Chordata
- Class: Actinopterygii
- Order: Acanthuriformes
- Family: Latilidae
- Genus: Lopholatilus; Goode & T. H. Bean, 1879

Type species
- Lopholatilus chamaeleonticeps Goode & T. H. Bean, 1879

= Lopholatilus =

Lopholatilus Temporal range: Middle Miocene–present

Genus of ray-finned fishes

Lopholatilus is a small genus of large-sized tilefishes native to the western Atlantic Ocean.

== Species ==
There are currently two recognized extant species in this genus:

- Lopholatilus chamaeleonticeps Goode & T. H. Bean, 1879 (Great northern tilefish)
- Lopholatilus villarii A. Miranda-Ribeiro, 1915 (Tile fish)

There are also two extinct species:

- †Lopholatilus ereborensis Carnevale & Godfrey, 2014 (Middle Miocene of Maryland & Virginia, US)
- †Lopholatilus rayus Purdy et al., 2001 (Early Pliocene of North Carolina, US)
