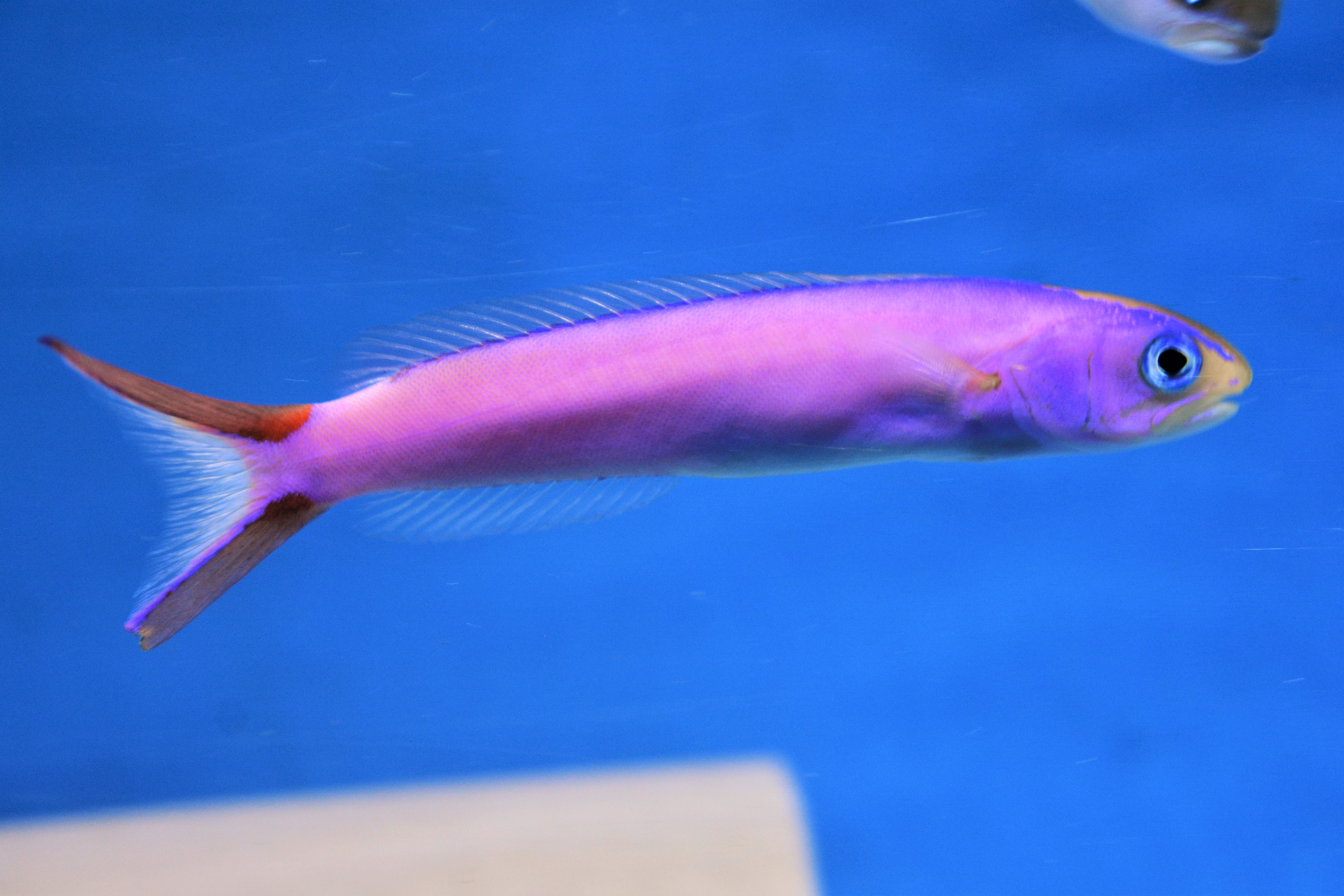

Scientific classification
- Kingdom: Animalia
- Phylum: Chordata
- Class: Actinopterygii
- Order: Acanthuriformes
- Family: Malacanthidae
- Genus: Hoplolatilus
- Species: H. purpureus

Binomial name
- Hoplolatilus purpureus W. E. Burgess, 1978

= Hoplolatilus purpureus =

Species of ray-finned fish

Hoplolatilus purpureus, the purple sand tilefish, is a species of marine ray-finned fish, a tilefish belonging to the family Malacanthidae. It is native to the western central Pacific Ocean where its range includes Indonesia, Timor-Leste, Philippines, Papua New Guinea and the Solomon Islands. It is native to the seaward side of reefs and occurs at depths of from 30 to 85 metres (98 to 279 ft). This species can reach a length of 13 centimetres (5.1 in) total length. It can also be found in the aquarium trade.
