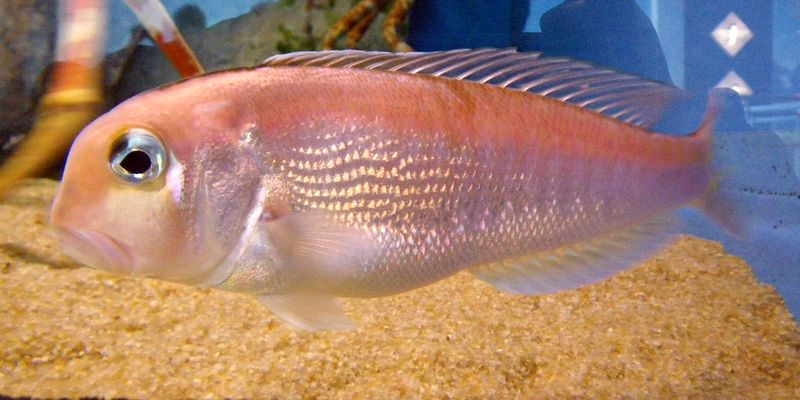

Conservation status
- Least Concern (IUCN 3.1)

Scientific classification
- Kingdom: Animalia
- Phylum: Chordata
- Class: Actinopterygii
- Order: Acanthuriformes
- Family: Latilidae
- Genus: Branchiostegus
- Species: B. japonicus

Binomial name
- Branchiostegus japonicus (Houttuyn, 1782)

Synonyms
- Coryphaena japonica Houttuyn, 1782; Latilus japonicus (Houttuyn, 1782); Coryphaena branchiostega Linnaeus, 1766 (ambiguous name, questionably applied to this species); Coryphaenoides hottuynii Lacépède, 1801 (ambiguous name, questionably applied to this species); Latilus ruber Kishinouye, 1907

= Branchiostegus japonicus =

Species of ray-finned fish

Branchiostegus japonicus, the horsehead tilefish, Japanese horsehead tilefish, okdom, red amadai or the red tilefish, is a species of marine ray-finned fish, a tilefish belonging to the family Malacanthidae. It is native to the western Pacific Ocean.

== Description ==
Branchiostegus japonicus has an elongated, fusiform body with slightly oblique jaws which reach back as far as the front third of the pupil. Overall the body is pinkish-red, overlain by a golden tint and with underlying pale yellow blotches. There are also a number of irregular reddish blotches on the back in the middle of the body, these give the impression of the mucus coating having been locally stripped away to show the underlying golden-yellow hue. The fold to the front of the dorsal fin is dark. Unlike some other species in the genus Branchiostegus, there are no silvery bars below the eye but there is a large triangular patch of silvery-white below the eye, which is characteristic, and a smaller similarly shaped white patch is sometimes present on the upper edge of the gill cover. The caudal fin has 5 or 6 vivid yellow stripes with the middle stripes being more obvious than this on the upper and lower caudal fin lobes. This species grows to a length of 46 centimetres (18 in) total length though most are around 35 centimetres (14 in). The greatest recorded weight for this species is 1.3 kilograms (2.9 lb).

== Distribution ==
Branchiostegus japonicus is found in the Western Pacific Ocean. Here it occurs from Honshu to Kyushu in Japan and in the East China Sea. Its range extends from the coast of China to southern Vietnam and into the waters of the Philippines. It has also been reported from the Arafura Sea but there is a lack of recent information confirming these reports.

== Habitat and biology ==
Branchiostegus japonicus is found in association with burrows created in soft substrates made up of sand and mud or shell, sand and mud at depths of 30 to 265 m (98 to 869 ft). It is frequently caught at depths of 80 to 200 m (260 to 660 ft) in the East China and Yellow Seas. They spawn twice a year, in July and October, with larvae first appearing in the Sado Straits of the Sea of Japan in October. The fishes excavate their burrows which they used to escape from predators and as nocturnal shelters. They are pelagic spawners, the eggs float in the water column as a mass encased in mucus.

== Systematics ==
Branchiostegus japonicus was first formally described in 1782 as Coryphaena japonica by the Dutch naturalist Martinus Hottuyn (1720-1798) with the type locality given as Nanao in Japan. When the French naturalist Constantine Samuel Rafinesque (1783-1840) created the genus Branchiostegus in 1815 he used Lacépède's Coryphaenoides hottuynii as the type species.

== Utilisation ==
Branchiostegus japonicus Is an important species for commercial fisheries, especially in Japan. It is taken using longlines and in trawls. The catch increased from 500 tonnes before 1956 to a maximum of 12,460 tonnes in 1970. The catch has declined since 1980 and in recent years have averaged around 6 000 tonnes per annum. The larger, more aggressive males are more easily caught and the fishing effort has increased as the catch has declined, an indicator that management of this fishery is required. It has been considered for mariculture, The flesh is sold fresh, in cans and preserved by salting.
