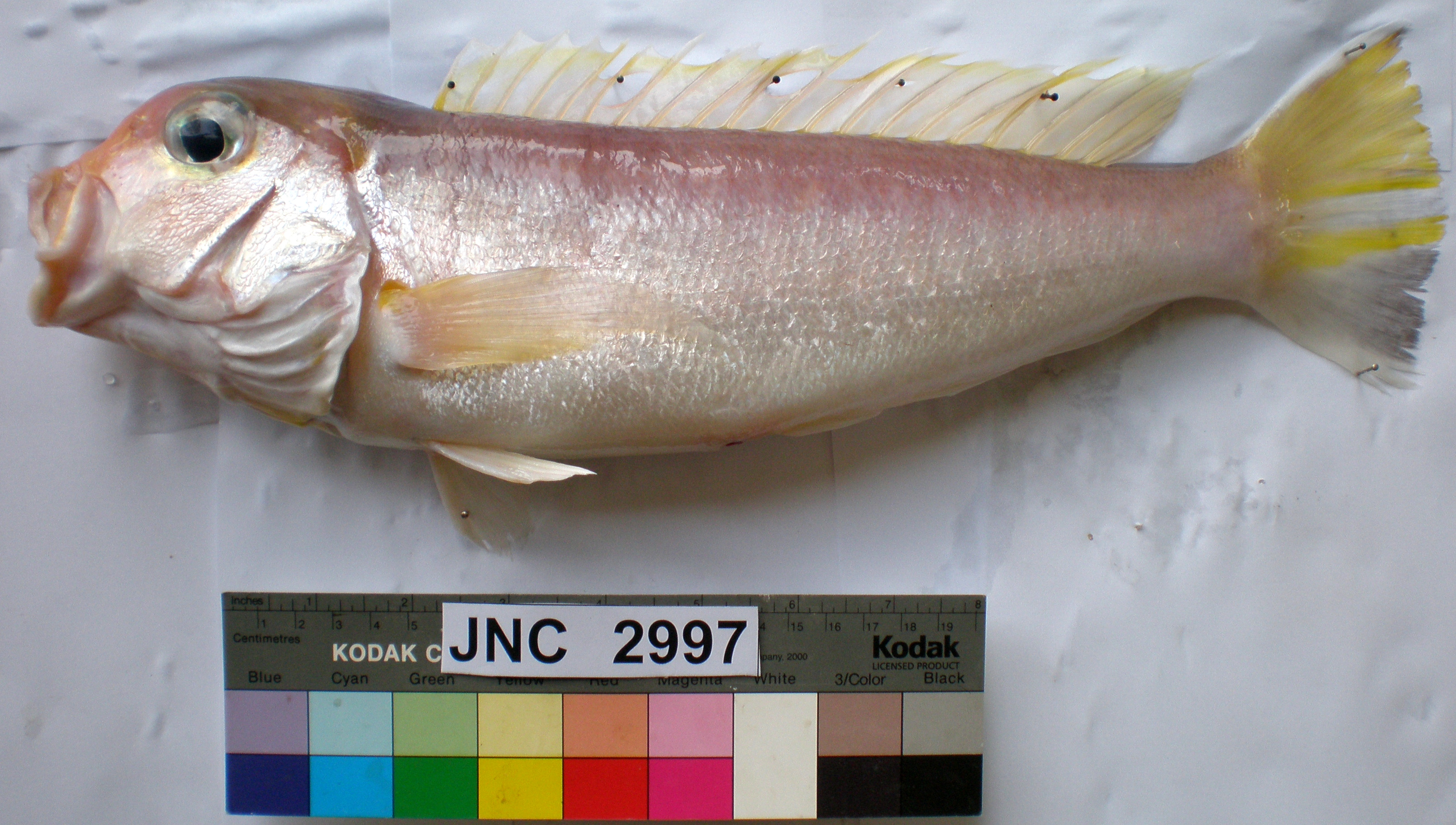
- Ward's Tilefish (B. wardi)

Scientific classification
- Kingdom: Animalia
- Phylum: Chordata
- Class: Actinopterygii
- Order: Acanthuriformes
- Family: Latilidae
- Genus: Branchiostegus
- Species: B. wardi

Binomial name
- Branchiostegus wardi Whitley, 1932

= Branchiostegus wardi =

Species of ray-finned fish

Branchiostegus wardi, or Ward's tilefish, is a species of marine ray-finned fish, a tilefish belonging to the family Malacanthidae. It is found from Australia to New Caledonia and Papua New Guinea. This species reaches a length of 40 cm (16 in).

== Etymology ==
The fish is named in honor of Alec Ward. He worked on trawlers in fairly deep water over the continental shelf and being a friend of the describer, he collected the type specimen and many other rare and interesting fishes while on board.
