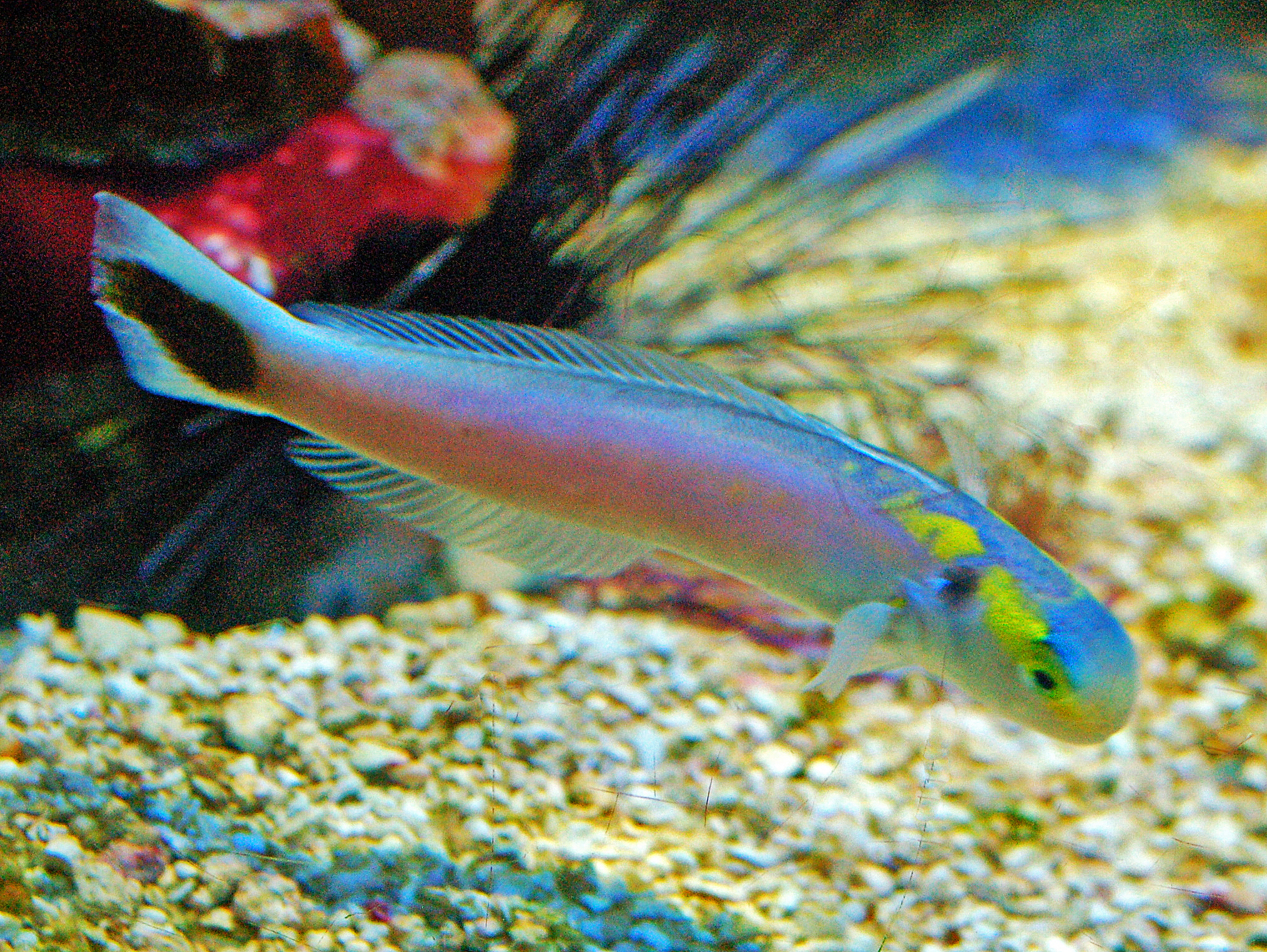

Conservation status
- Least Concern (IUCN 3.1)

Scientific classification
- Kingdom: Animalia
- Phylum: Chordata
- Class: Actinopterygii
- Division: Teleostei
- Order: Acanthuriformes
- Family: Malacanthidae
- Genus: Hoplolatilus
- Species: H. fourmanoiri

Binomial name
- Hoplolatilus fourmanoiri Smith, 1964

Synonyms
- Asymmetrurus fourmanoiri (Smith, 1964)

= Hoplolatilus fourmanoiri =

Species of fish

Hoplolatilus fourmanoiri, commonly known as the yellow-spotted tilefish, is a species of marine ray-finned fish, a tilefish belonging to the family Malacanthidae.

Some authors consider Hoplolatilus luteus a junior synonym of Hoplolatilus fourmanoiri, based upon morphological and molecular data.

== Etymology ==
The generic name Hoplolatilus is from Ancient Greek hoplon, meaning weapon.

== Distribution ==
This species is native to tropical Western Pacific, Brunei, Philippines, Indonesia, Solomon Islands, and Vietnam.

== Habitat and biology ==
Hoplolatilus luteus is a coastal reef-associated fish. It prefers depths between 5 and 60 m (16 and 197 ft). These tropical fishes can usually be observed on silty sand bottoms with coral rocks. They live solitary or in pairs. They mainly feed zooplankton. This species is listed as Least Concern.

== Description ==
Hoplolatilus fourmanoiri can reach a length of 14 centimetres (5.5 in). These fishes have a thin, elongated body, compressed on the sides. The body is whitish, with a few yellow spots close to the head and on the back and a dark bluish spot close to the operculum. The caudal fin is truncated, with a dark spot in the central part. They show 10 dorsal spines and 21–13 dorsal soft rays. Anal spines are 2, while anal soft rays are 18–19.
