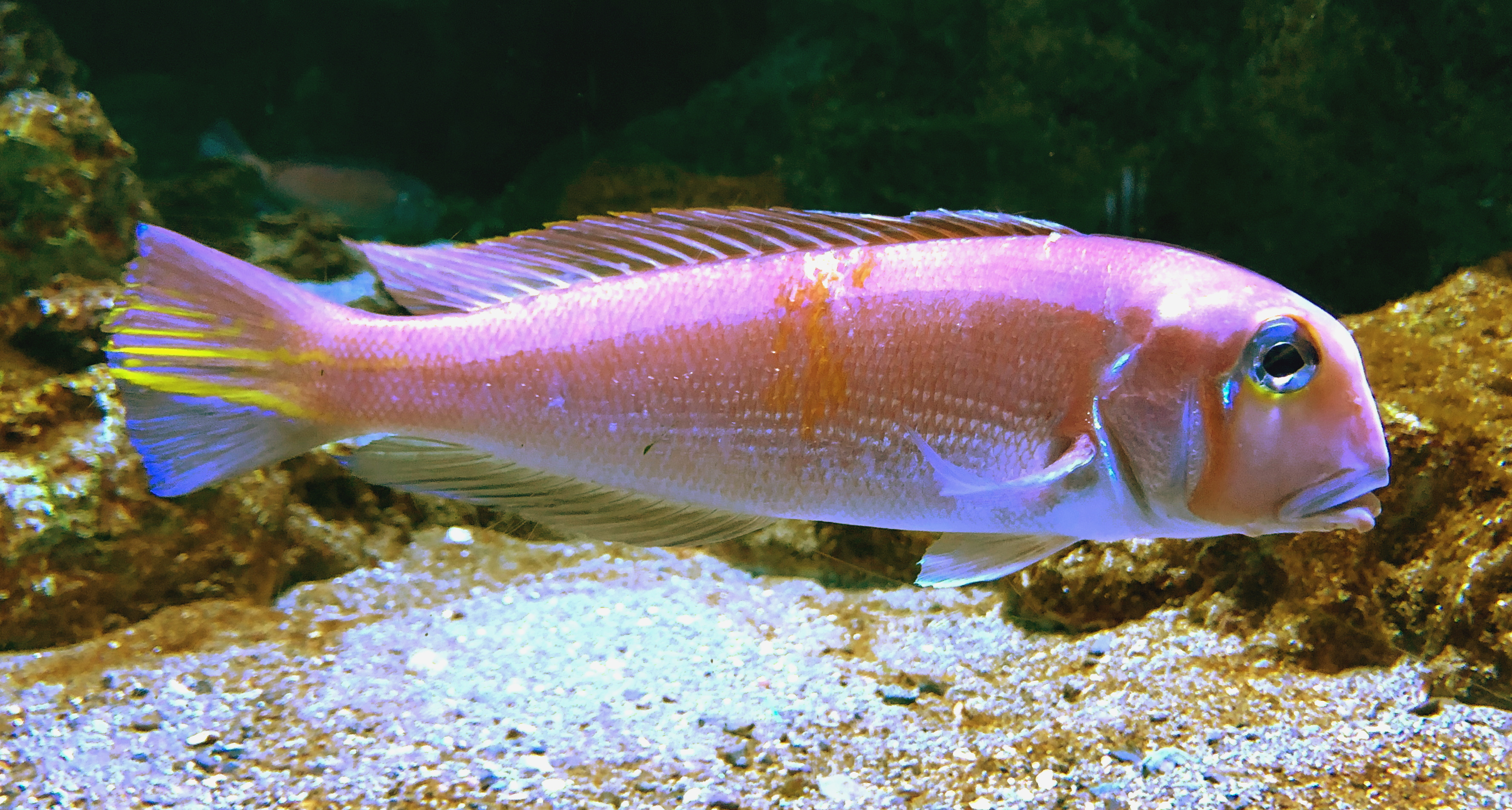
- Branchiostegus japonicus
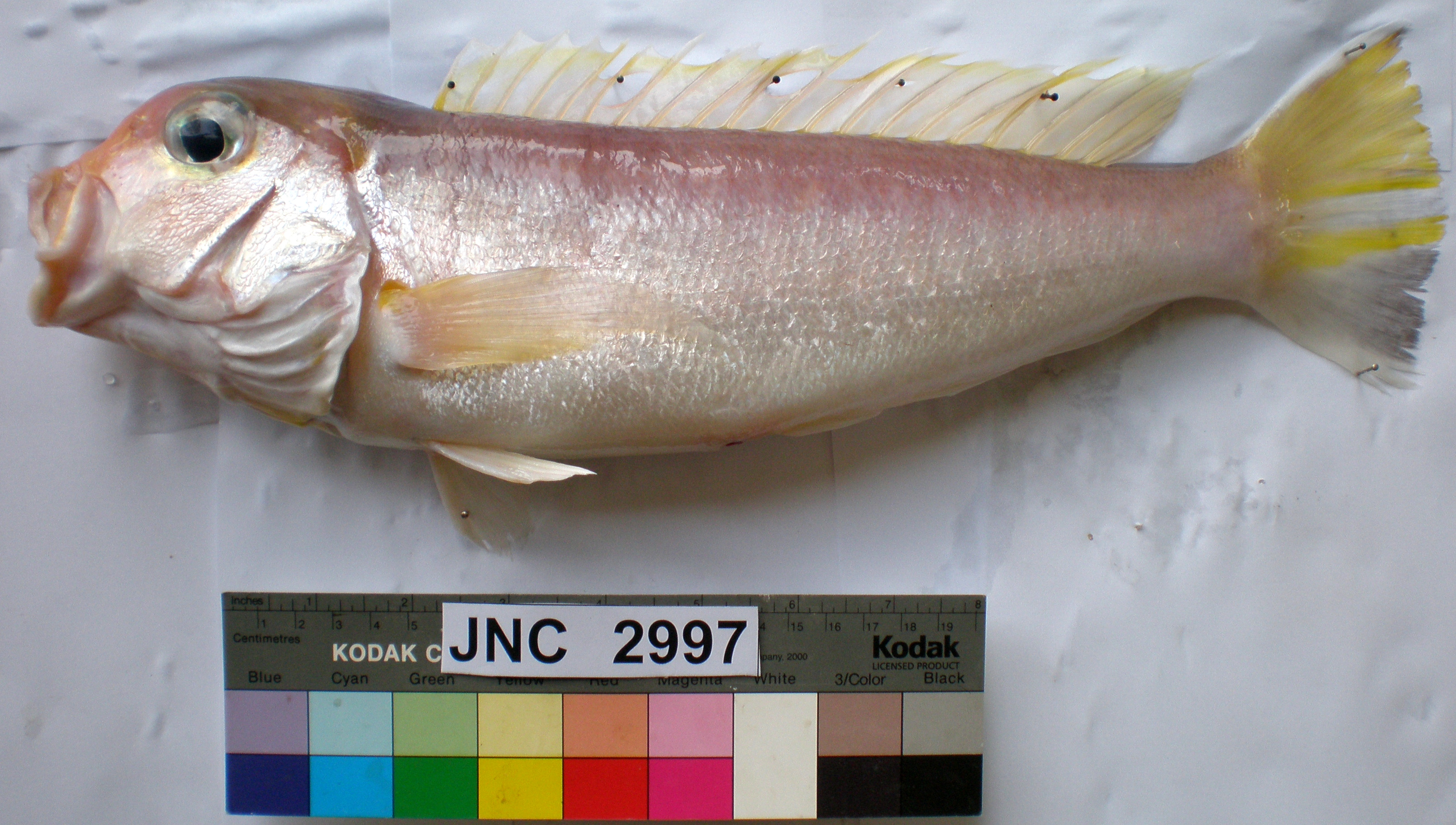
- Ward's Tilefish (B. wardi)

Scientific classification
- Kingdom: Animalia
- Phylum: Chordata
- Class: Actinopterygii
- Order: Acanthuriformes
- Family: Latilidae
- Genus: Branchiostegus; Rafinesque, 1815

Type species
- Coryphaenoides hottuynii Lacépède, 1801

Synonyms
- Coryphaena Houttuyn, 1782 (pre-occupied); Coryphaenoides Lacépède, 1801 (pre-occupied); Latilus G. Cuvier, 1830

= Branchiostegus =

Branchiostegus Temporal range: Late Miocene to present

Genus of fishes

Branchiostegus is a genus of marine ray-finned fishes, tilefishes, belonging to the family Malacanthidae. They are found in the eastern Atlantic Ocean through the Indian Ocean to the western Pacific Ocean. Here they create burrows in soft substrates in the comparatively deep waters of the continental shelf and slope.

== Characteristics ==
Branchiostegus tilefishes have a rectangular body shape with a square profile to the head. They have a raised seam situated to the anterior of the dorsal fin, this can be reduced but it is always there. They have a body which is around four times as long as it is deep. There are fine serrations on the preopercular upper arm while its lower arm has very few or no serrations and there is no spine at its angle. The operculum has a single flexible, blunt spine. The mouth is slightly angled and extend to the front of the eye. The dorsal and anal fins are long and unbroken. The dorsal fin has 6 to 8 spines, typically 7 and 14 to 16, normally 15, soft rays. The anal fin contains 2 spines and 11 to 13, typically 12, soft rays. The caudal fin is rounded, truncate, or double emarginate and sometimes has elongated tips. They have pelagic larvae which have many spines on their heads and serrated ridges.

== Species ==
There are currently 19 recognized species in this genus:

- Branchiostegus albus Dooley, 1978
- Branchiostegus argentatus (G. Cuvier, 1830)
- Branchiostegus auratus (Kishinouye, 1907)
- Branchiostegus australiensis Dooley & Kailola, 1988 (Australian tilefish)
- Branchiostegus biendong Hiramatsu, Vinh, Endo, 2019
- Branchiostegus doliatus (G. Cuvier, 1830) (Ribbed tilefish)
- Branchiostegus gloerfelti Dooley & Kailola, 1988
- Branchiostegus hedlandensis Dooley & Kailola, 1988 (Port Hedland tilefish)
- Branchiostegus ilocanus Herre, 1928
- Branchiostegus japonicus (Houttuyn, 1782) (Horsehead tilefish)
- Branchiostegus okinawensis Hiramatsu & Yoshino, 2012
- Branchiostegus paxtoni Dooley & Kailola, 1988 (Paxton's tilefish)
- Branchiostegus saitoi Dooley & Iwatsuki, 2012
- Branchiostegus sanae Huang, Chen, Ke & Zhang, 2025 (Mononoke tilefish)
- Branchiostegus sawakinensis Amirthalingam, 1969 (Freckled tilefish)
- Branchiostegus semifasciatus (Norman, 1931) (Zebra tilefish)
- Branchiostegus serratus Dooley & Paxton, 1975 (Australian barred tilefish)
- Branchiostegus vittatus Herre, 1926
- Branchiostegus wardi Whitley, 1932 (Ward's tilefish)

A single apparent fossil species, †Branchiostegus mesogeus Arambourg, 1927 is known from the latest Miocene of Algeria. However, this specimen is incomplete and poorly preserved, so it remains uncertain whether the specimen actually belongs to this genus.

== Systematics ==
Branchiostegus was created by the French naturalist Constantine Samuel Rafinesque (1783-1840) in 1815, with Lacépède's Coryphaenoides hottuynii (now recognised as a synonym of Branchiostegus japonicus) as its type species. The genus name is a compound of branchios meaning "gill" and stegos meaning "cover". Rafinesque put this name forward without explanation but he placed the genus in a subfamily of Lophionota, an unavailable name for a grouping which approximates to the currently recognised Coryphaenidae, in which he put dolphinfishes, sailfishes and many other marine fishes and which were distinguished by the possession of branchiostegal membranes. The genus is currently placed in the subfamily Latilinae.
