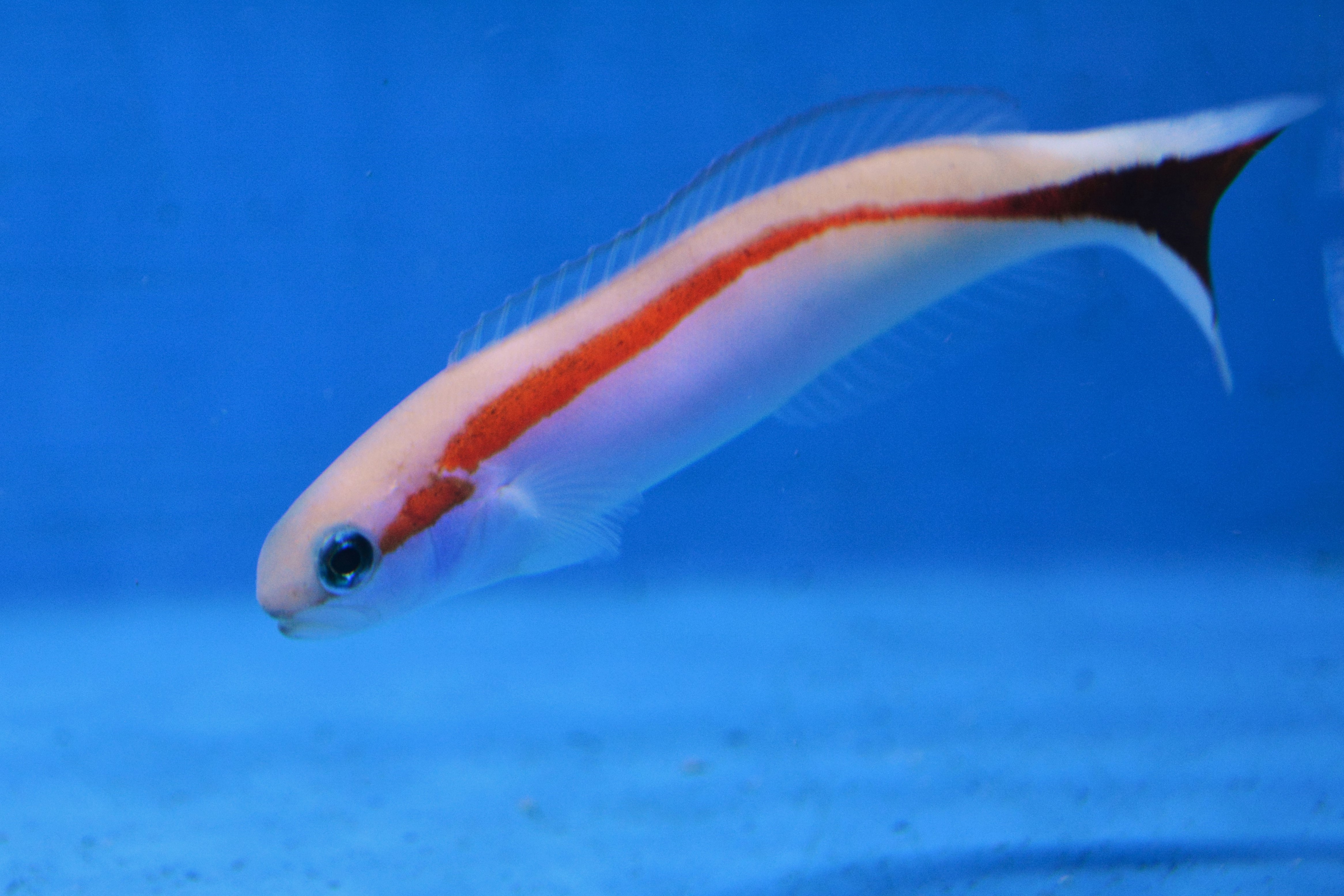

Scientific classification
- Kingdom: Animalia
- Phylum: Chordata
- Class: Actinopterygii
- Order: Acanthuriformes
- Family: Malacanthidae
- Genus: Hoplolatilus
- Species: H. marcosi

Binomial name
- Hoplolatilus marcosi W. E. Burgess, 1978

= Hoplolatilus marcosi =

Species of fish

Hoplolatilus marcosi, the redback sand tilefish, is a species of marine ray-finned fish, a tilefish belonging to the family Malacanthidae. It is native to the western central Pacific Ocean.

== Description ==
Hoplolatilus marcosi has an elongated fusiform body with a slightly forked caudal fin.it is distinctive within the genus by having a horizontal red stripe running either side of the lateral line, although this looks black from a distance. The dorsal fin contains 9 spines and 16 soft rays while the anal fin has 1-2 spines and 14-15 soft rays. This species attains a maximum total length of 12 cm (4.7 in) although 10.4 cm (4.1 in).

== Distribution ==
Hoplolatilus marcosi is found in the western Pacific Ocean and has been recorded from the Indonesia, Philippines, Palau, Papua New Guinea and the Solomon Islands.

== Habitat and biology ==
Hoplolatilus marcosi is normally found at depths of 18 to 80 m (59 to 262 ft), although usually deeper than 30 m (98 ft), close to drop offs and in areas of sand or rubble. This species created large mounds of rubble. It feeds on zooplankton. The redback sand tilefish is monogamous and forms pairs to spawn. They can live in aggregations and each pair may steal rubble from the mounds of their neighbours.

== Systematics ==
Hoplolatilus marcosi was first formally described in 1978 by Warren E. Burgess with the type locality given as Tingloy Island off Orensi near Mabini, Batangas, Luzon Island, Philippines.

== Etymology ==
The specific name honours Ferdinand Marcos (1917–1989) who was president of the Philippines at the time this species was discovered.

== Utilisation ==
Hoplolatilus marcosi occasionally appears in the aquarium trade.
