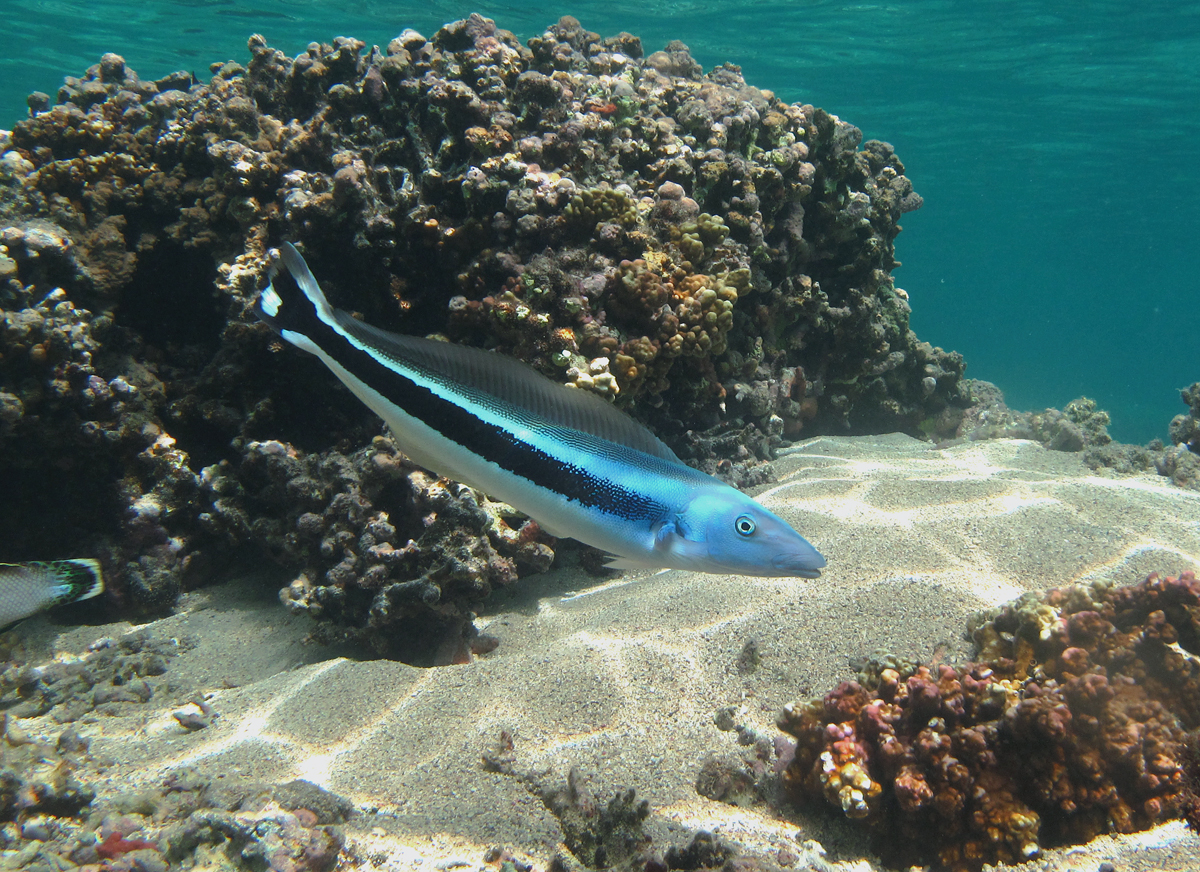

Scientific classification
- Kingdom: Animalia
- Phylum: Chordata
- Class: Actinopterygii
- Division: Teleostei
- Order: Acanthuriformes
- Family: Malacanthidae
- Genus: Malacanthus
- Species: M. latovittatus

Binomial name
- Malacanthus latovittatus (Lacépède, 1801)

Synonyms
- Labrus latovittatus Lacépède, 1801; Oceanops latovittatus (Lacépède, 1801); Taenianotus latovittatus (Lacépède, 1802); Malacanthus taeniatus Valenciennes, 1839; Malacanthus urichthys Fowler, 1904

= Blue blanquillo =

Species of fish

The blue blanquillo (Malacanthus latovittatus), also known as the banded blanquillo, striped blanquillo, false whiting, sand tilefish or eye of the sea, is a species of marine ray-finned fish, a tilefish belonging to the family Malacanthidae. It is found in the Indo-Pacific.

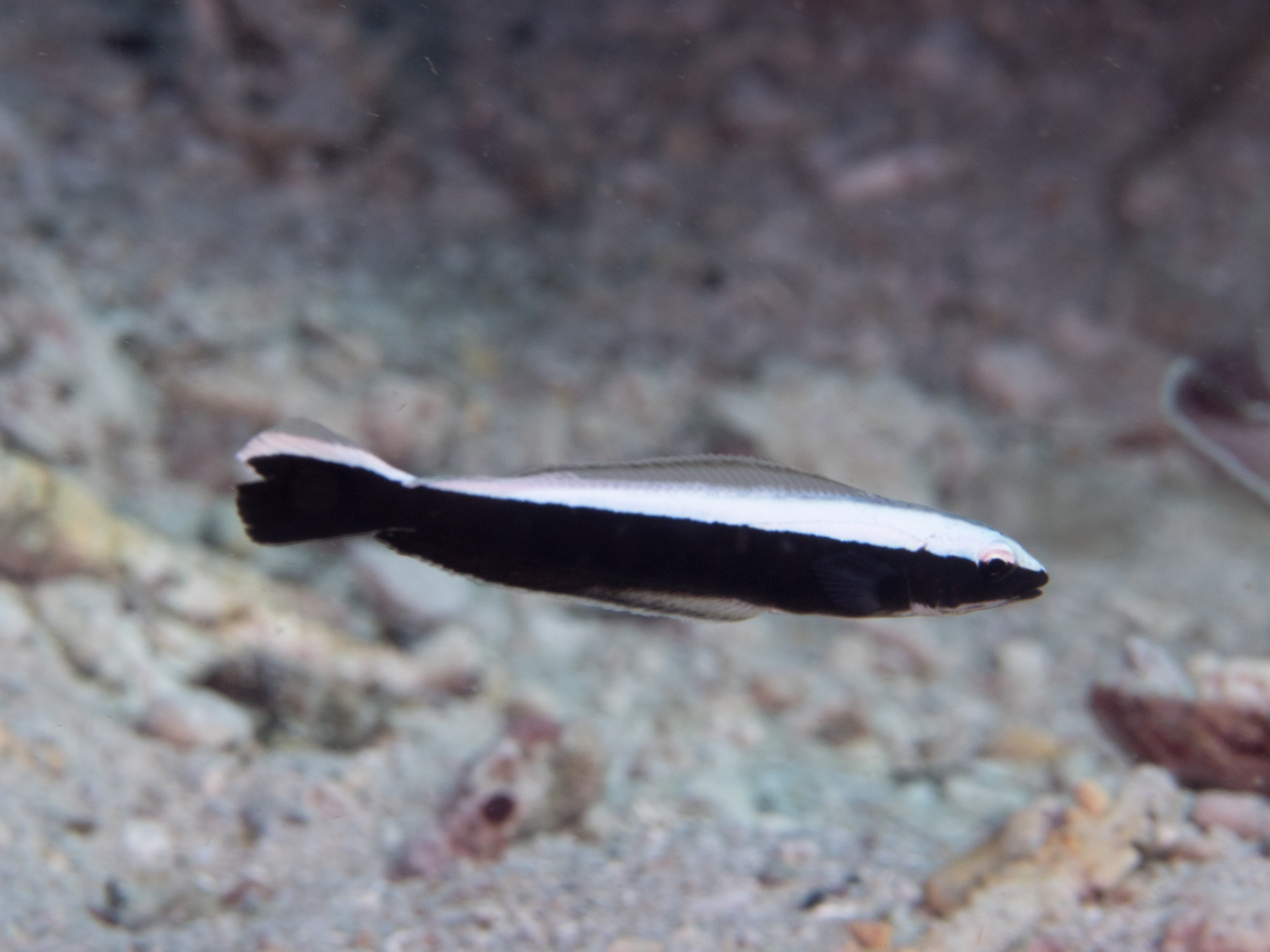
Juvenile

== Description ==
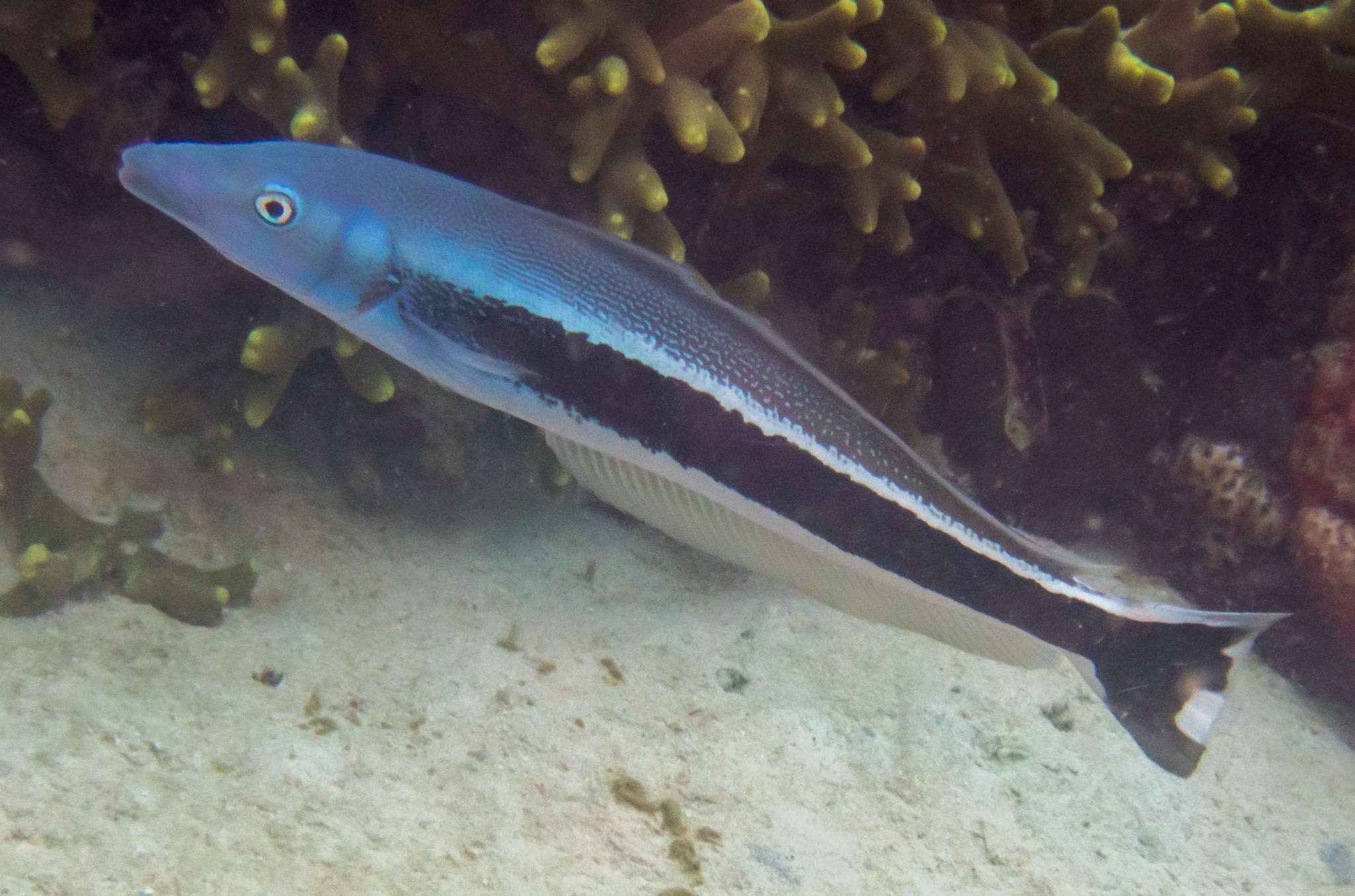
In Indonesia

The blue blanquillo has an elongated body with a pointed snout, the mouth reaching as far as the forward nostril. The margin of the preoperculum is smooth and the Gill cover has a sharp spine which is similar in size to diameter of the pupil. The head and anterior part of the body are blue, this colour fades posteriorly. There is a wide black lateral stripe which starts from the base of the pectoral fin in adults and from the snout in juveniles. The adults have fine lattice patterning on their upper back with a white area on the middle of the rear margin of the caudal fin. There is a pale line along upper margin of the greyish dorsal fin, the anal and pelvic fins are white while the pectoral fins are bluish. The juveniles resemble the juveniles of the ringed slender wrasse (Hologymnosus annulatus). The dorsal fin of this species contains 3–4 spines and 43–47 soft rays while the anal fin has 1 spine and 37–40 soft rays. It attains a maximum total length of 45 cm (18 in) although 35 cm (14 in) standard length is more typical.

== Distribution ==
The blue blanquillo has an Indo-Pacific distribution. It is found in the Red Sea and along the eastern coast of Africa, across the Indian Ocean and into the Pacific Ocean as far as the Hawaiian Islands, Tabuaeran and Samoa. It occurs north to Japan and south to Australia. In Australia their range extends from Dirk Hartog Island in Western Australia to Ashmore Reef in the Timor Sea and the Great Barrier Reef off Queensland south as far as Seal Rocks. This species also occurs at the Cocos (Keeling) Islands and Christmas Island.

== Habitat and biology ==
Malacanthus latovittatus is found at depths of 4 to 65 m (13 to 213 ft) on the outer slopes of reefs. It has also been found in brackish water in the Goldie River of Papua New Guinea. They live as solitary fish or in pairs. They are not known to clean other fish, but may mimic the wrasse to deter predators from eating it. They tend to swim high above the substrate picking prey from the seabed with their excellent eyesight. The adults mate in monogamous pairs. This is a wary species which swims away from threats instead of diving into its burrow. This species lives in and around a burrow it constructs using sand and rubble.

The blue blanquillo's main food is benthic invertebrates or zooplankton, but they also feed on crustaceans such as crabs and shrimp, molluscs, worms, sea urchins and small fish.

== Systematics ==
The Blue blanquillo was first formally described in 1801 as Labrus latovittatus by the French zoologist Bernard German de Lacépède (1756–1825). The specific name is a compound of latus meaning "broad" and vittatus meaning "striped", a reference to the black stripe.

== Utilisation ==
The blue blanquillo is taken by spearfishing, hook-and-line, and traps. It is found in markets throughout its range, albeit infrequently, and may be marketed fresh or preserved by salting. It is rare in the aquarium trade.
