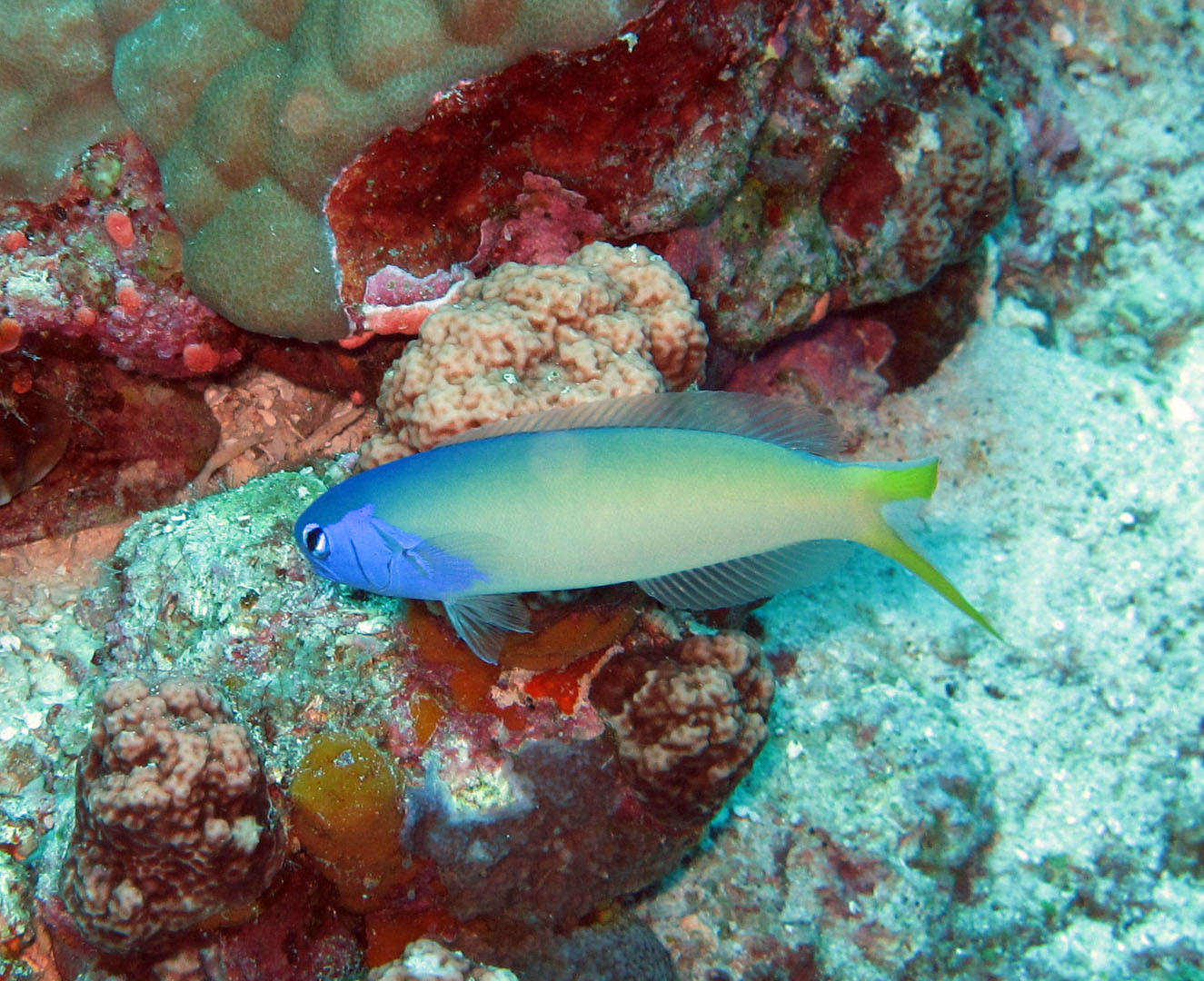
- Bluehead tilefish (Hoplolatilus starcki)

Scientific classification
- Kingdom: Animalia
- Phylum: Chordata
- Class: Actinopterygii
- Order: Acanthuriformes
- Family: Malacanthidae
- Subfamily: Malacanthinae
- Genus: Hoplolatilus; Günther, 1887

Type species
- Latilus fronticinctus Günther, 1887

Synonyms
- Asymmetrurus E. Clark & Ben-Tuvia, 1973

= Hoplolatilus =

Hoplolatilus Temporal range: Middle Eocene to present

Genus of ray-finned fishes

Hoplolatilus is a genus of tilefishes native to the Indian Ocean and the western Pacific Ocean. The chameleon tilefish (Hoplolatilus chlupatyi), also known as the flashing tilefish, is well known in particular in the aquarium hobby due to its unique ability to change colors in an instant with the help of specialized proteins in its skin that can reflect light in different wavelengths, allowing it to cycle between primary and secondary colors on the light spectrum.

== Species ==
There are currently 13 recognized species in this genus:

- Hoplolatilus chlupatyi Klausewitz, McCosker, J. E. Randall & Zetzsche, 1978 (Chameleon sand tilefish)
- Hoplolatilus cuniculus J. E. Randall & Dooley, 1974 (Dusky tilefish)
- Hoplolatilus erdmanni G. R. Allen, 2007 (Triton tilefish)
- Hoplolatilus fourmanoiri J. L. B. Smith, 1964 (Yellow-spotted tilefish)
- Hoplolatilus fronticinctus (Günther, 1887) (Pastel tilefish)
- Hoplolatilus geo H. Fricke & Kacher, 1982
- Hoplolatilus luteus G. R. Allen & Kuiter, 1989 (Yellow tilefish)
- Hoplolatilus marcosi W. E. Burgess, 1978 (Redback sand tilefish)
- Hoplolatilus oreni (E. Clark & Ben-Tuvia, 1973)
- Hoplolatilus pohle Earle & Pyle, 1997 (Pohle's tilefish)
- Hoplolatilus purpureus W. E. Burgess, 1978 (Purple sand tilefish)
- Hoplolatilus randalli G. R. Allen, Erdmann & A. M. Hamilton, 2010 (Randall's tilefish)
- Hoplolatilus starcki J. E. Randall & Dooley, 1974 (Stark's tilefish)

A single fossil species, †Hoplolatilus visendus Bannikov, 1997, is known from the Middle Eocene of the North Caucasus, Russia. This is the oldest known definitive fossil tilefish, and supports this genus having a rather old origin.
