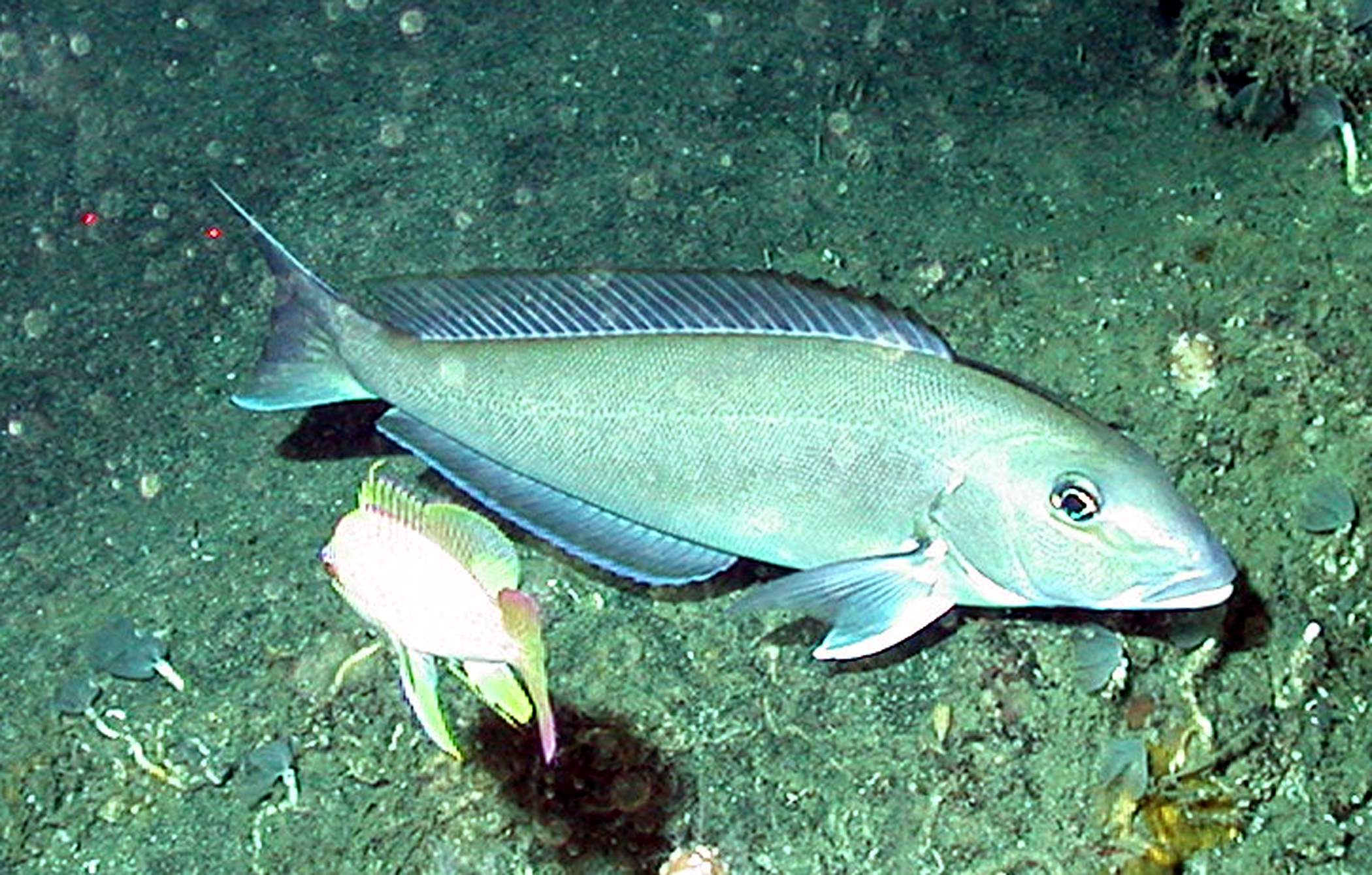
- Great northern tilefish, Lopholatilus chamaeleonticeps

Scientific classification
- Kingdom: Animalia
- Phylum: Chordata
- Class: Actinopterygii
- Order: Acanthuriformes
- Family: Latilidae; Gill, 1862

Genera
- See text

Synonyms
- Branchiostegidae Jordan, 1923

= Deepwater tilefish =

Deepwater tilefish Temporal range: Middle Miocene–present

Family of fishes

Deepwater tilefishes are a family, Latilidae, of marine ray-finned fish native to the Atlantic, Pacific, and Indian Oceans. As their name suggests, they inhabit relatively deep waters on the continental shelf and slope, below 50 m in depth, and as deep as 200 m. They have a long life span, up to 46 years (females) and 39 years (males).

== Taxonomy ==
They are related to the more slender sand tilefish (Malacanthidae) of shallower tropical waters, but appear physically distinct, having deeper bodies bearing predorsal ridge and heads rounded to squarish in profile. They were long maintained as a distinct family (Branchiostegidae) from the Malacanthidae, but more recent taxonomic authorities reclassified both as subfamilies of a single family, Malacanthidae. However, the most recent taxonomic authorities, such as Eschmeyer's Catalog of Fishes, have returned to classifying both as distinct families, although the deepwater tilefishes are now placed in the family Latilidae, an older name for the family which Branchiostegidae is synonymous with.

=== Genera ===
The following genera are placed in this family:

Family Latilidae Gill, 1862

- genus Branchiostegus Rafinesque, 1815
- genus Caulolatilus Gill, 1862
- genus Lopholatilus Goode & Bean, 1879

== Consumption ==
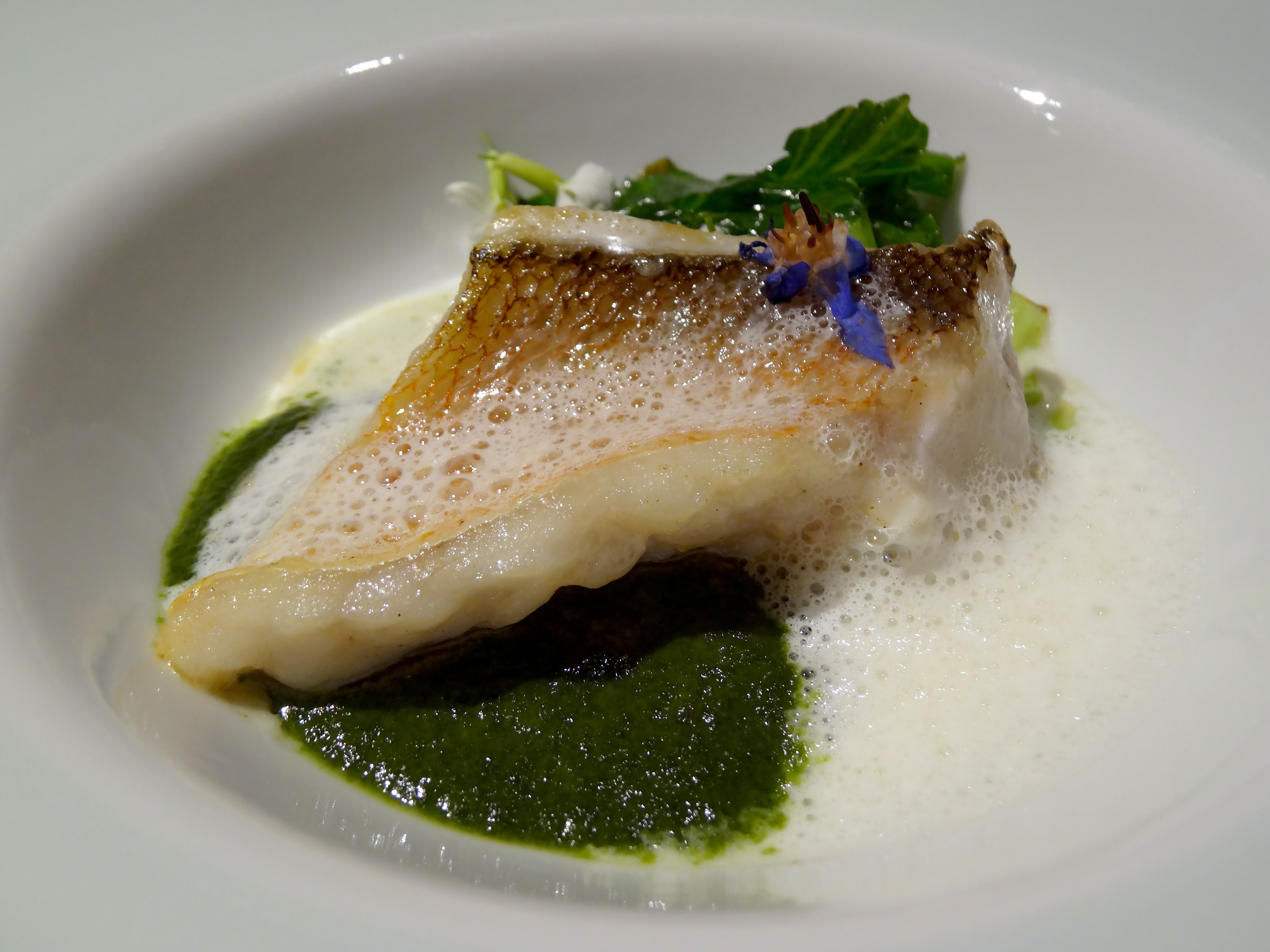
Serving of Red tilefish Branchiostegus japonicus

After the 1882 mass die-off, great northern tilefish were thought to be extinct until a large number were caught in 1910 near New Bedford, Massachusetts. Commercial fisheries exist for the largest species, making them important food fish. However, the U.S. Food and Drug Administration warns pregnant or breastfeeding women against eating tilefish and some other fish due to mercury contamination. Atlantic Ocean tilefish may have lower levels of mercury and may be safer to consume.

== Gallery ==
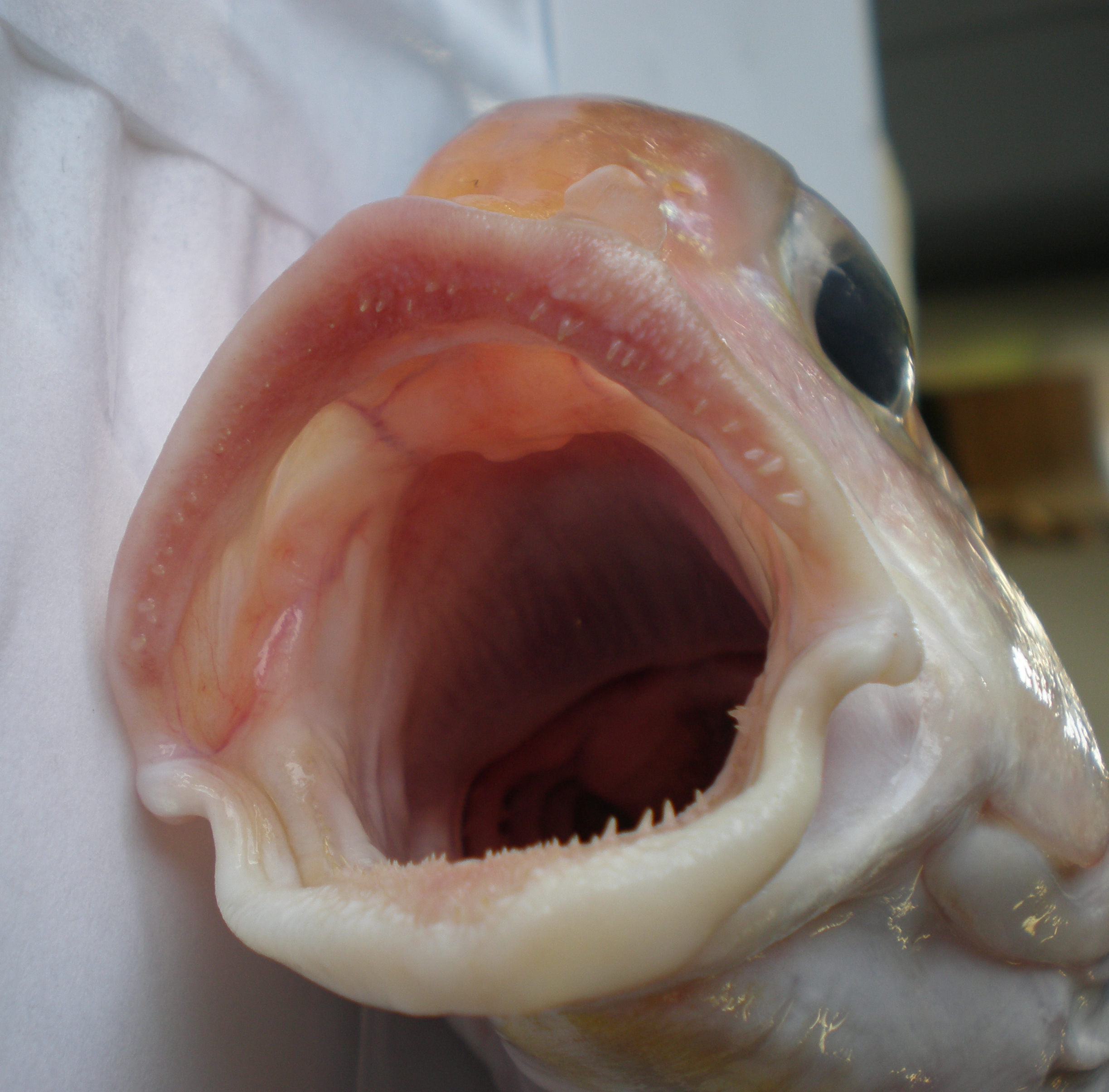
Branchiostegus wardi

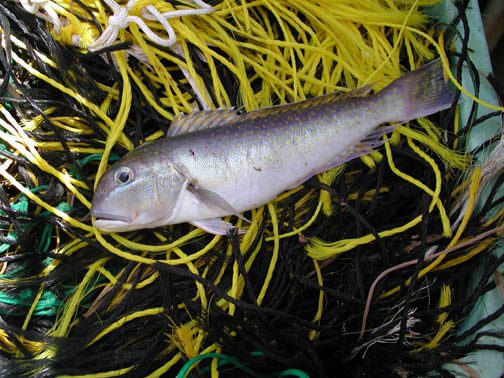
Great northern tilefish, Lopholatilus chamaeleonticeps

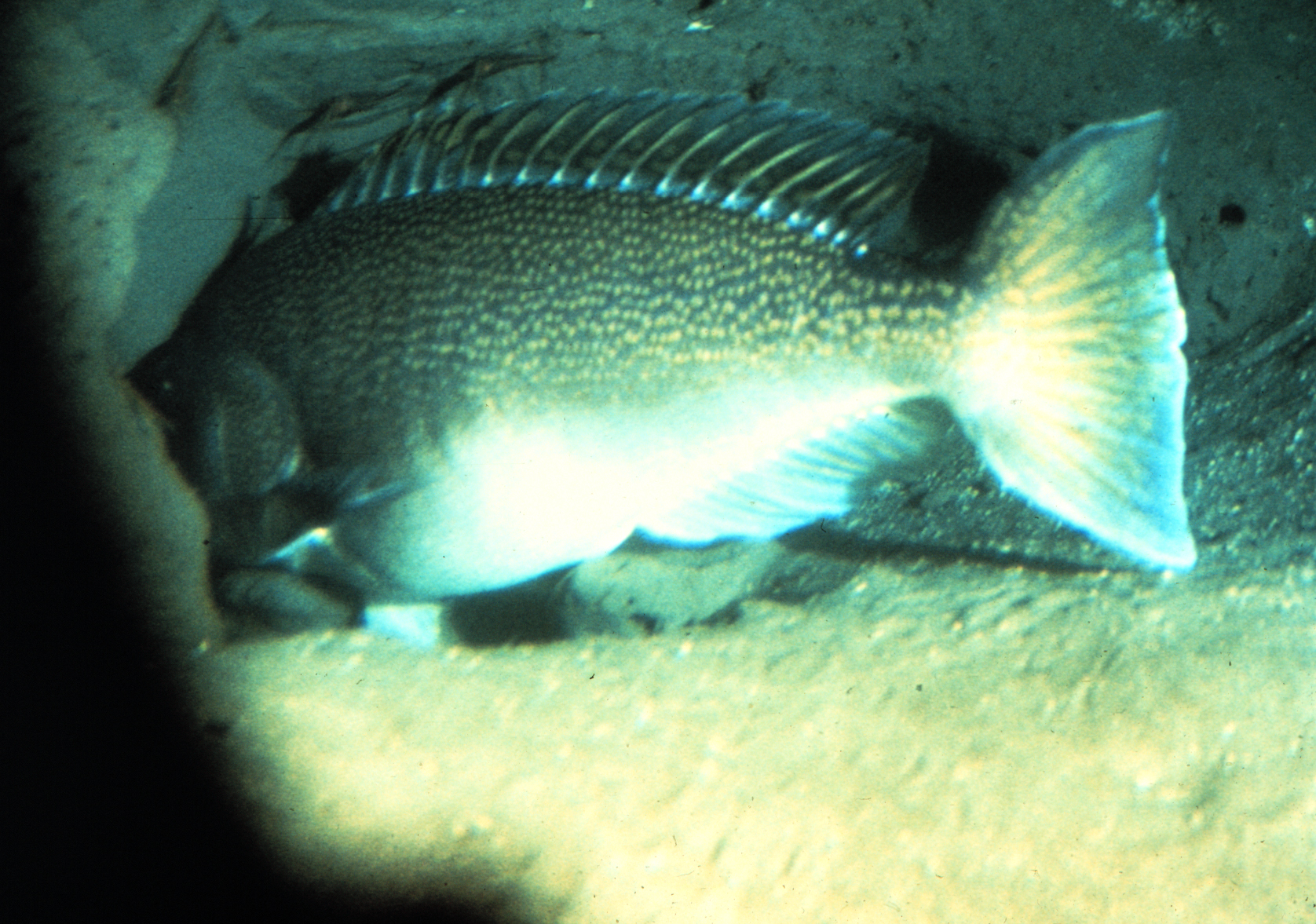
Tilefish live in burrows, sometimes forming undersea Pueblo villages. Lopholatilus chamaeleonticeps
