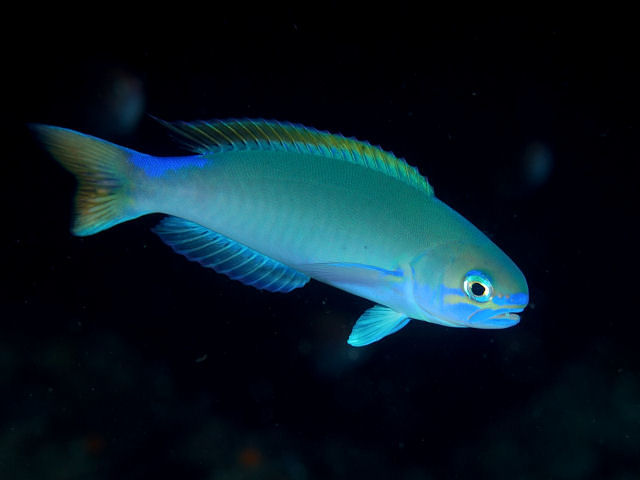
- Hoplolatilus randalli

Scientific classification
- Kingdom: Animalia
- Phylum: Chordata
- Class: Actinopterygii
- Division: Teleostei
- Order: Acanthuriformes
- Family: Malacanthidae; Poey, 1861

Genera
- Hoplolatilus; Malacanthus

= Tilefish =

Tilefishes Temporal range: Middle Eocene to present

Family of fishes

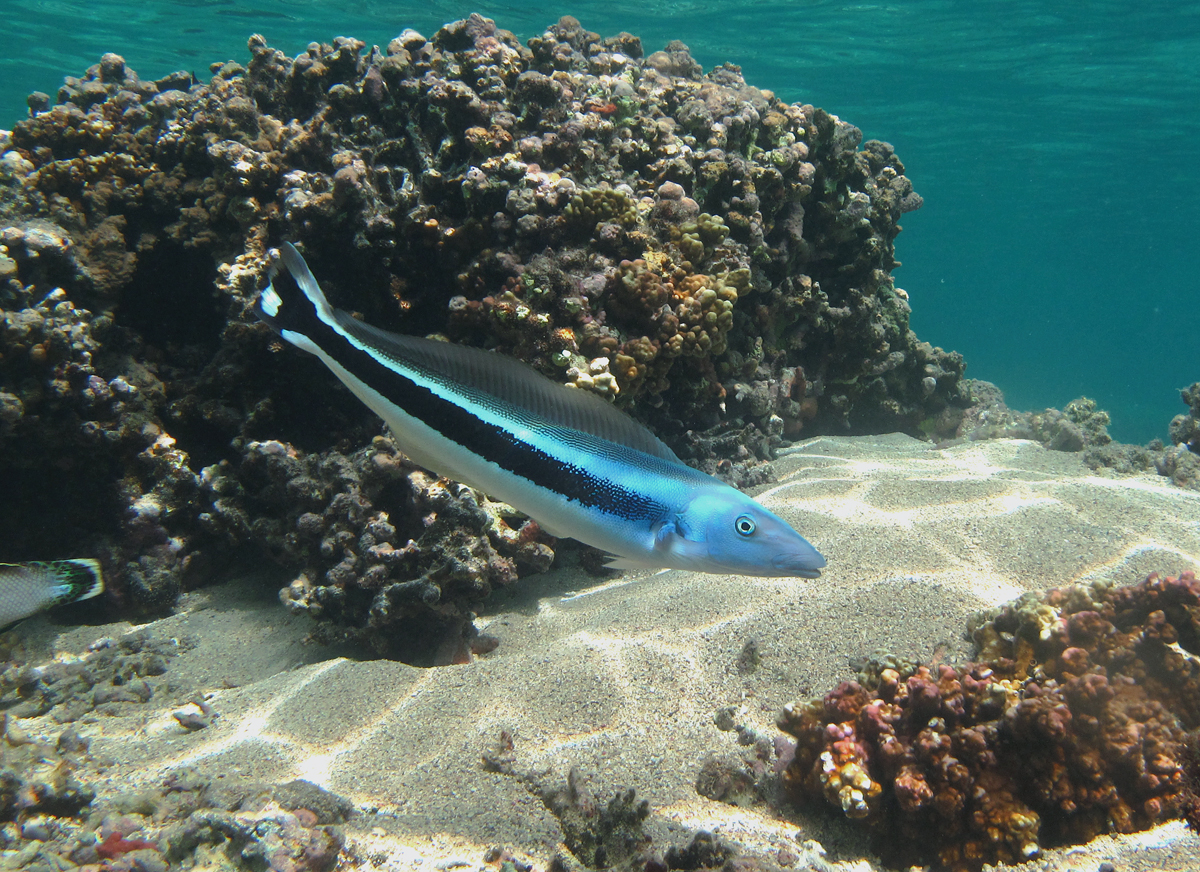
Blue blanquillo, Malacanthus latovittatus

Tilefishes or sand tilefishes are mostly small percomorph marine fish comprising the family Malacanthidae. They are usually found in sandy, shallow areas, especially near coral reefs. Exceptionally colorful species of tilefish are favored for aquariums.

== Taxonomy ==
The similar, closely related deepwater tilefishes of the family Latilidae (formerly Branchiostegidae) have variously been placed as an evolutionarily distinct family from the Malacanthidae or as a subfamily of it. Presently, Eschmeyer's Catalog of Fishes follows the former classification.

Previously, the placement of this family within the Eupercaria was uncertain. The 5th edition of Fishes of the World classified them within the Perciformes but in a grouping of seven families that may have a relationship to Acanthuroidei, Monodactylidae, and Priacanthidae, while other authorities place it outside the Perciformes, at an order level but with its true relationships being incertae sedis. Another study from 2000 even found a potential relationship between the tilefish and the flying gurnards, but later studies have not followed this. More recently, phylogenetic evidence has conclusively found that tilefishes belong to a wider clade of largely reef-dwelling fishes in the order Acanthuriformes, and are likely related to snappers.

The following two genera are classified within the family Malacanthidae, in total it contains 16 species.

- Family Malacanthidae Poey, 1861
  - genus Hoplolatilus Günther 1887
  - genus Malacanthus Cuvier 1829

The oldest known definitive fossil tilefish is †Hoplolatilus visendus, known from a fossil skeleton discovered from the Middle Eocene of the North Caucasus, Russia.

== Description ==
Unlike the deeper-bodied deepwater tilefishes, tilefishes are more slender with elongated bodies lacking predorsal ridge, and have rather rounded heads. Unlike deepwater tilefishes, tilefishes inhabit waters shallower than 50 m depth. They also tend to be smaller in size; for example, the 11 cm (4.3 in) yellow tilefish (Hoplolatilus luteus) compared to the 125 cm (49 in) great northern tilefish (Lopholatilus chamaeleonticeps), which has a weight of 30 kg (66 lb).

Both tilefish families have long dorsal and anal fins, the latter having one or two spines. The gill covers (opercula) have one spine which may be sharp or blunt; some species also have a cutaneous ridge atop the head. The tail fin may range in shape from truncated to forked. Notable exceptions include three small, vibrant Hoplolatilus species: the purple sand tilefish (H. purpureus), Starck's tilefish (H. starcki), and the redback sand tilefish (H. marcosi).

Tilefish larvae are notable for their elaborate spines. The family name Malacanthidae, is based on the type genus Malacanthus which is a compound of the Greek words malakos meaning "soft" and akanthos meaning "thorn", possibly derived from the slender, flexible spines in the dorsal fin of Malacanthus plumieri.

== Habitat and diet ==
Generally shallow-water fish, tilefish are usually found at depths of above 50 m in both temperate and tropical waters of the Atlantic, Pacific, and Indian Oceans. All species seek shelter in self-made burrows, caves at the bases of reefs, or piles of rock, often in canyons or at the edges of steep slopes. Either gravelly or sandy substrate may be preferred, depending on the species.

Most species are strictly marine; an exception is found in the blue blanquillo (Malacanthus latovittatus) which is known to enter the brackish waters of Papua New Guinea's Goldie River.

Tilefish feed primarily on small benthic invertebrates, especially crustaceans such as crab and shrimp. Mollusks, worms, sea urchins, and small fish are also taken.

== Behaviour and reproduction ==
Active fish, tilefish keep to themselves and generally stay at or near the bottom. They rely heavily on their keen eyesight to catch their prey. If approached, the fish quickly dive into their constructed retreats, often head-first. The chameleon sand tilefish (Hoplolatilus chlupatyi) relies on its remarkable ability to rapidly change colour (with a wide range) to evade predators.

Many species form monogamous pairs and others colonial. Some species, such as the rare pastel tilefish (Hoplolatilus fronticinctus) of the Indo-Pacific, actively build large rubble mounds above which they school, and in which they live. These mounds serve as both refuge and as a microecosystem for other reef species.

The reproductive habits of tilefish are not well studied. Spawning occurs throughout the spring and summer; all species are presumed not to guard their broods. Eggs are small (< 2 mm) and made buoyant by oil. The larvae are pelagic and drift until the fish have reached the juvenile stage.
