= Microcotyle hainanensis =

Scientific classification
- Kingdom: Animalia
- Phylum: Platyhelminthes
- Class: Monogenea
- Order: Mazocraeidea
- Family: Microcotylidae
- Genus: Microcotyle
- Species: M. hainanensis

Binomial name
- Microcotyle hainanensis Zhang, Yang & Xiao in Zhang, Yang & Liu, 2001

Species of worms

Microcotyle hainanensis is a species of monogenean, parasitic on the gills of a marine fish. It belongs to the family Microcotylidae.

== Taxonomy ==
Microcotyle hainanensis was described based on 7 mounted specimens, collected from the gills of Branchiostegus auratus. The specific epithet hainanensis refers to the type (and only known) locality, Hainan.

== Description ==
Microcotyle hainanensis has the general morphology of all species of Microcotyle, with a flat stout body, comprising an anterior part which contains most organs and a posterior part called the haptor. The haptor is symmetrical, nearly perpendicular to the body proper and bears 36-48 clamps, arranged as two rows, one on each side. The clamps of the haptor attach the animal to the gill of the fish. There are also two small buccal suckers at the anterior extremity. The digestive organs include an anterior, terminal mouth, a muscular rounded pharynx slightly larger than oral sucker, an oesophagus without diverticula and a posterior intestine bifurcating at the level of the copulatory organ in two with two lateral branches; the intestinal branches are provided with diverticula on both sides, terminating at the end of the haptor. Each adult contains male and female reproductive organs. The reproductive organs include an anterior heart-shaped genital atrium, armed with spines, a dorsal vagina which was not observed, a single question mark-shaped ovary, and 14-18 rounded or oval testes which are posterior to the ovary and arranged in two rows.

The species can be distinguished from the most closely related species Microcotyle branchiostegi by the muscular cirrus armed with spines that is absent in M. branchiostegi, and by the number of clamps.

== Hosts ==
The type and only recorded host is the tilefish species Branchiostegus auratus (Malacanthidae).
