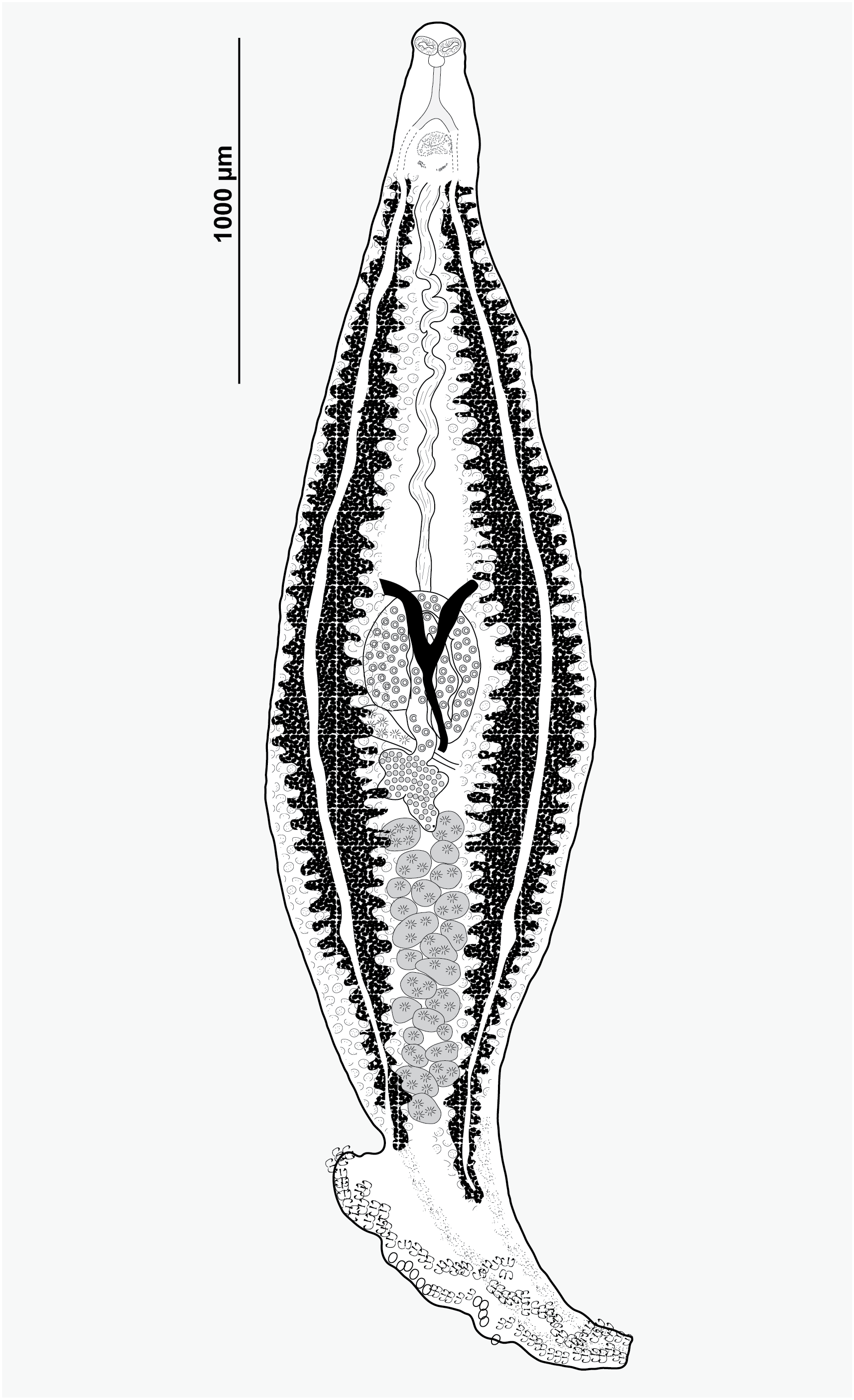
- Microcotyle visa

Scientific classification
- Kingdom: Animalia
- Phylum: Platyhelminthes
- Class: Monogenea
- Order: Mazocraeidea
- Family: Microcotylidae
- Genus: Microcotyle
- Species: M. visa

Binomial name
- Microcotyle visa Bouguerche, Gey, Justine & Tazerouti, 2019

= Microcotyle visa =

Species of worms

Microcotyle visa is a species of monogenean, parasitic on the gills of a marine fish. It belongs to the family Microcotylidae.

== Systematics ==
Microcotyle visa was described and illustrated by Bouguerche et al., based on and 31 specimens (including three with molecular information), from the gills of the bluespotted seabream Pagrus caeruleostictus (Sparidae) collected at Bouharoune off the Algerian coast. The analysis of the cytochrome oxydase 1 gene of Microcotyle visa revealed only minor intraspecific variation (1.4%), clearly lower than the distance between this species and other Microcotyle species (10–15 %). This monogenean is the fourth member of the genus known to parasitise a sparid host. In the same paper, a species of Paramicrocotyle sp. included in the molecular analysis was nested in a robust Microcotyle-Paramicrocotyle clade and Paramicrocotyle was considered a junior synonym of Microcotyle. Paramicrocotyle danielcarrioni and Paramicrocotyle moyanoi were transferred to the genus Microcotyle.

== Description ==
Microcotyle visa has the general morphology of all species of Microcotyle, with a symmetrical elongate body and a narrow anterior end, comprising an anterior part which contains most organs and a posterior part called the haptor. The haptor is subsymmetrical or symmetrical, and bears 59–126 clamps, arranged in 2 equal or sub-equal lateral rows, one on each side. The clamps of the haptor attach the animal to the gill of the fish. There are also two septate oval buccal suckers at the anterior extremity. The digestive organs include an anterior, terminal mouth, a subspherical pharynx, a long thin oesophagus without lateral diverticula and a posterior intestine that bifurcates at level of genital atrium in two lateral branches apparently fused just anterior to the haptor; the left branch extends into haptor. Each adult contains male and female reproductive organs. The reproductive organs include an anterior genital atrium, comprising the anterior atrium proper and two posterior "pockets". The atrium proper is shaped as inverted heart, armed with numerous conical spines of similar sizes; the spines are more dense in the centre than in lateral parts, arranged as one main anterior group and two postero-lateral smaller groups called “pockets”, a vagina with a middorsal pore visible in most specimens, posterior to genital atrium, a single complex ovary and 14–29 testes, post-ovarian, occurring in 2 rows generally intercaecal, in posterior half of body proper. The eggs are fusiform with long filaments at both ends, often coiled. Three sequences of the cox1 gene has been published.

== Etymology ==
The species name, visa, refers to the happiness of the first author when she obtained her visa, after a period of uncertainty.

== Hosts and localities ==
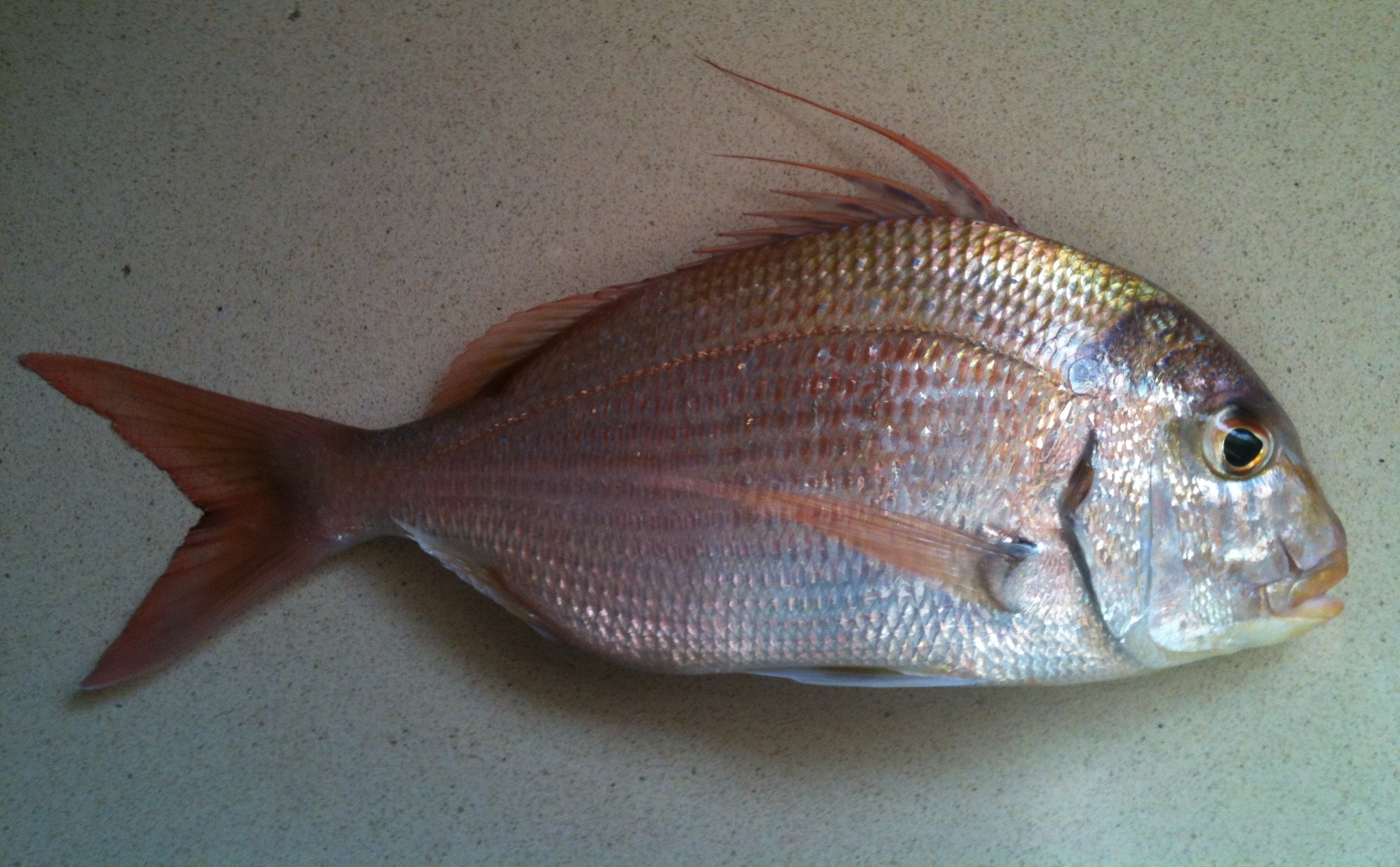
The bluespotted seabream Pagrus caeruleostictusis the type host of Microcotyle algeriensis

The type-host is the bluespotted seabream Pagrus caeruleostictus (Sparidae). The identity of fish host was confirmed by barcoding. The type-locality is off Algeria.
