= Microcotyle gimpo =

Scientific classification
- Kingdom: Animalia
- Phylum: Platyhelminthes
- Class: Monogenea
- Order: Mazocraeidea
- Family: Microcotylidae
- Genus: Microcotyle
- Species: M. gimpo

Binomial name
- Microcotyle gimpo Yamaguti, 1958

Synonyms
- Paramicrocotyle gimpo (Yamaguti, 1958) Caballero & Bravo-Hollis, 1972; Caenomicrocotyle (Caenomicrocotyle) gimpo (Yamaguti, 1958) Unnithan1971

Species of worms

Microcotyle gimpo is a species of monogenean, parasitic on the gills of a marine fish. It belongs to the family Microcotylidae.

== Taxonomy ==
Microcotyle gimpo was described by Satyu Yamaguti in 1958, based on one immature and two mature specimens from the gills of Enedrias nebulosus (Pholidae) (currently Pholis nebulosa). In 1972, Caballero y Caballero and Bravo-Hollis erected the genus Paramicrocotyle to describe Paramicrocotyle tampicensis and Paramicrocotyle atriobursata off Mexico, and placed within this genus sixteen species previously assigned to the genus Microcotyle. including M. gimpo. Unnithan (1971) placed M. gimpo in his new genus and subgenus Caenomicrocotyle as Caenomicrocotyle (Caenomicrocotyle) gimpo. However, this species was returned to the genus Microcotyle by Mamaev (1986) who considered Paramicrocotyle a junior subjective synonym of Microcotyle.

== Description ==
Microcotyle gimpo has the general morphology of all species of Microcotyle, with a symmetrical fusiform body with a rounded anterior extremity, comprising an anterior part which contains most organs and a posterior part called the haptor. The haptor is symmetrical, and bears 58-64 clamps, arranged as two rows, one on each side. The clamps of the haptor attach the animal to the gill of the fish. There are also two buccal suckers at the anterior extremity with distinct partition. The digestive organs include an anterior, terminal mouth, a pharynx, a wide oesophagus bifurcating immediately behind the genital pore and a posterior intestine with two lateral branches provided with numerous secondary branches; the left branch extends into the haptor further backward than the right one. Each adult contains male and female reproductive organs. The reproductive organs include an anterior genital atrium, armed with numerous very spines, a medio-dorsal vagina, a single ovary shaped like an interrogation mark and 13-18 testes occupying the whole postovarian intercoecal field. The eggs are fusiform, thick-shelled and tapering into a short blunt-pointed process at one end and a longer pointed process at the other.

== Hosts and localities ==
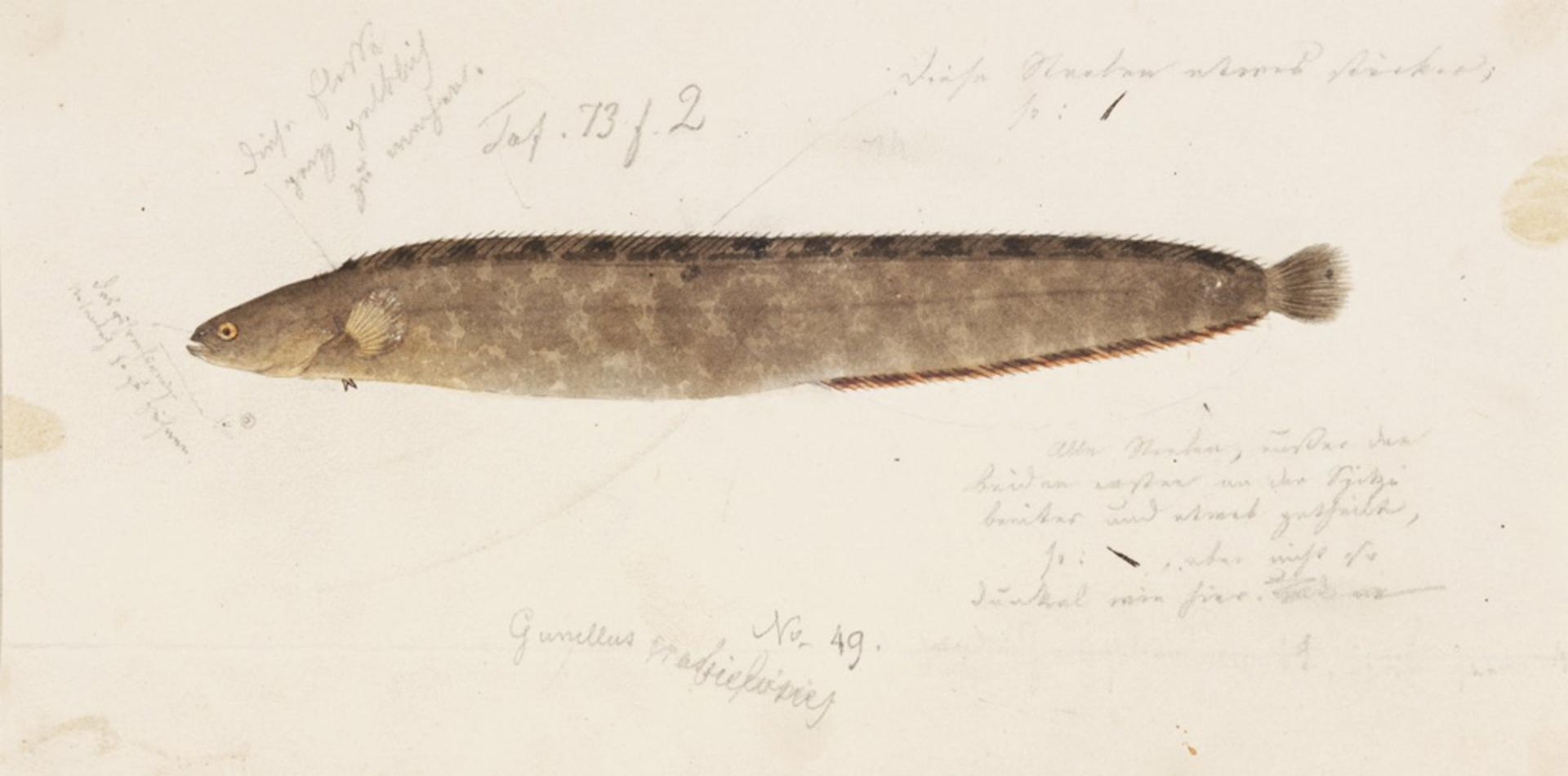
Enedrias nebulosus is the type host of Microcotyle gimpo

The type-host is Enedrias nebulosus (Pholidae) (currently Pholis nebulosa). The type-locality is the Inland Sea of Japan.
