= Microcotyle lichiae =

Scientific classification
- Kingdom: Animalia
- Phylum: Platyhelminthes
- Class: Monogenea
- Order: Mazocraeidea
- Family: Microcotylidae
- Genus: Microcotyle
- Species: M. lichiae

Binomial name
- Microcotyle lichiae Ariola, 1899

Synonyms
- Microcotyle (Microcotyle) lichiae (Ariola, 1899) Unnithan1971

Species of worms

Microcotyle lichiae is a species of monogenean, parasitic on the gills of a marine fish. It belongs to the family Microcotylidae.

== Taxonomy ==
Microcotyle lichiae was described by Ariola in 1899, from the gills of the leerfish Lichia amia (Carangidae). Unnithan (1971) placed M. lichiae in the nominal subgenus Microcotyle as Microcotyle (Microcotyle) lichiae. However, this combination was suppressed by Mamaev in 1986.

== Morphology ==
Microcotyle lichiae has the general morphology of all species of Microcotyle, with a flat body 0.5 mm in length, comprising an anterior part which contains most organs and a posterior part called the haptor. The haptor is asymmetrical and bears 52 clamps, arranged in two rows (31 in one row, 21 on the other). The clamps of the haptor attach the animal to the gill of the fish. There are also two small ellipsoidal and aseptate buccal suckers at the anterior extremity. The digestive organs include an anterior, terminal mouth, a muscular pharynx, and a posterior intestine with two lateral blind-ending branches. Each adult contains male and female reproductive organs.

According to Ariola, the male reproductive organs include an anterior genital atrium with spines, posterior to the intestinal bifurcation; a vas deferens opening in the genital atrium; and a number of testes posterior to the ovary and arranged in two simple and parallel rows. Each testes has a canalicum, which sends its products in the common vas deferens. The arrangement and shape of the spines of the genital atrium differs from what was observed in the congeners. The spines are very numerous and ordered in five concentric rings, which present, progressively, an ever decreasing number; their dimensions are not constant. The female reproductive organs comprises a dorsal vagina unarmed and elongated transversely; a single median ovary, immediately below the vaginal opening giving rises to uterus; a uterus, opening in the genital atrium as well. Eggs have a distinct oval shape, with filaments at each end.

== Etymology ==
The specific name of this species, lichiae, relates to the genitive form of the generic name of the type host fish, Lichia amia.

== Hosts and localities ==
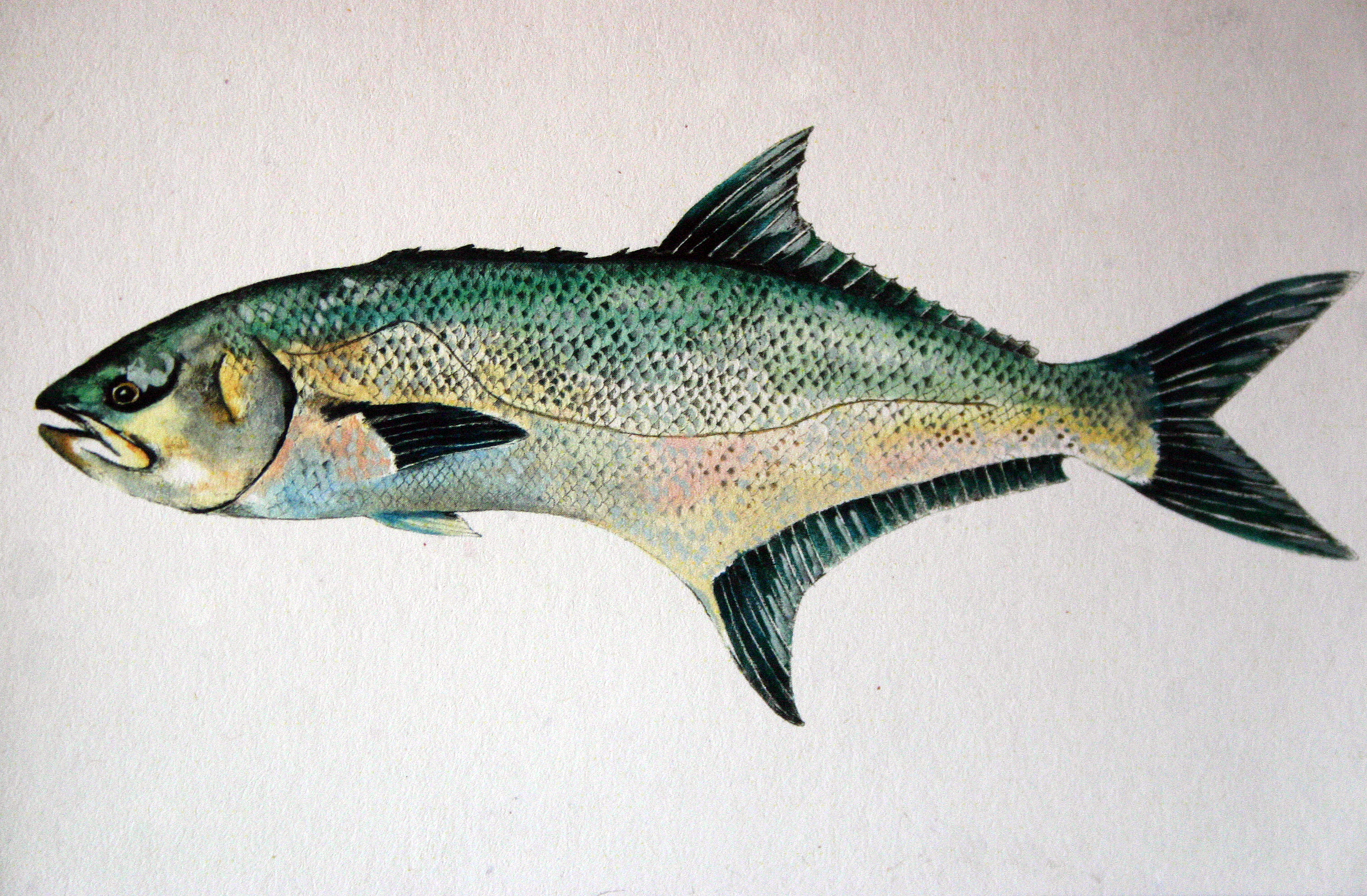
The leerfish Lichia amia is the type host of Microcotyle lichiae

The type-host is the leerfish Lichia amia (Carangidae). The type-locality is off Genova, Italy.
