= Microcotyle ditrematis =

Scientific classification
- Kingdom: Animalia
- Phylum: Platyhelminthes
- Class: Monogenea
- Order: Mazocraeidea
- Family: Microcotylidae
- Genus: Microcotyle
- Species: M. ditrematis

Binomial name
- Microcotyle ditrematis Yamaguti, 1940

Species of worms

Microcotyle ditrematis is a species of monogenean, parasitic on the gills of a marine fish. It belongs to the family Microcotylidae.

== Hosts and localities ==
The host-type is Ditrema temminckii temminckii (Embiotocidae) and the type locality is off Japan. The species has been recorded since from other hosts: Beryx splendens (Berycidae), Neoditrema ransonnetii (Embiotocidae) and Ditrema viride (Embiotocidae) off Kanagawa, Japan.

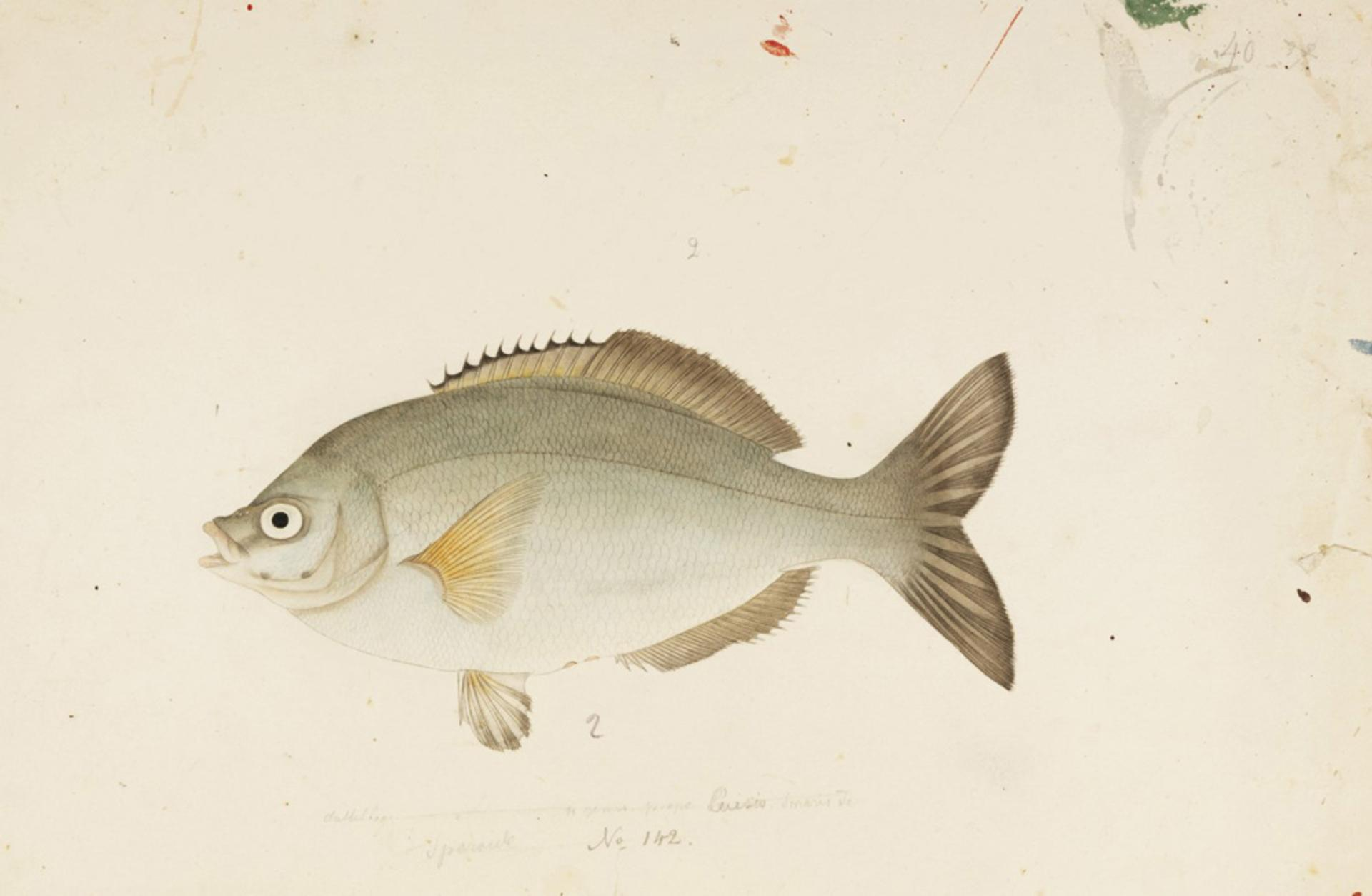
Ditrema temminckii temminckii is the type host of Microcotyle ditrematis
