= Microcotyle jonii =

Scientific classification
- Kingdom: Animalia
- Phylum: Platyhelminthes
- Class: Monogenea
- Order: Mazocraeidea
- Family: Microcotylidae
- Genus: Microcotyle
- Species: M. jonii

Binomial name
- Microcotyle jonii Hadi, Bilqees & Nasira, 2011

Species of worms

Microcotyle jonii is a species of monogenean, parasitic on the gills of a marine fish. It belongs to the family Microcotylidae. It was described from the gills of Lutjanus jonii (Lutjanidae) from Karachi coast off Pakistan.

== Description ==
Microcotyle jonii has the general morphology of all species of Microcotyle, with a symmetrical elongated flattened body, comprising an anterior part which contains most organs and a posterior part called the haptor. The haptor is symmetrical, long, irregular, and bears numerous clamps, arranged as two rows, one on each side. The clamps of the haptor attach the animal to the gill of the fish. There are also two buccal suckers at the anterior extremity. The digestive organs include an anterior, terminal mouth, a pharynx, an oesophagus and a posterior intestine with two lateral branches provided with numerous secondary branches. Each adult contains male and female reproductive organs. The reproductive organs include an anterior genital atrium, armed with numerous very spines, a medio-dorsal vagina, a single tubular ovary and 15 testes which are posterior to the ovary.

== Etymology ==
The species name is derived from the generic name of the type-host Lutjanus jonii.

== Hosts and localities ==
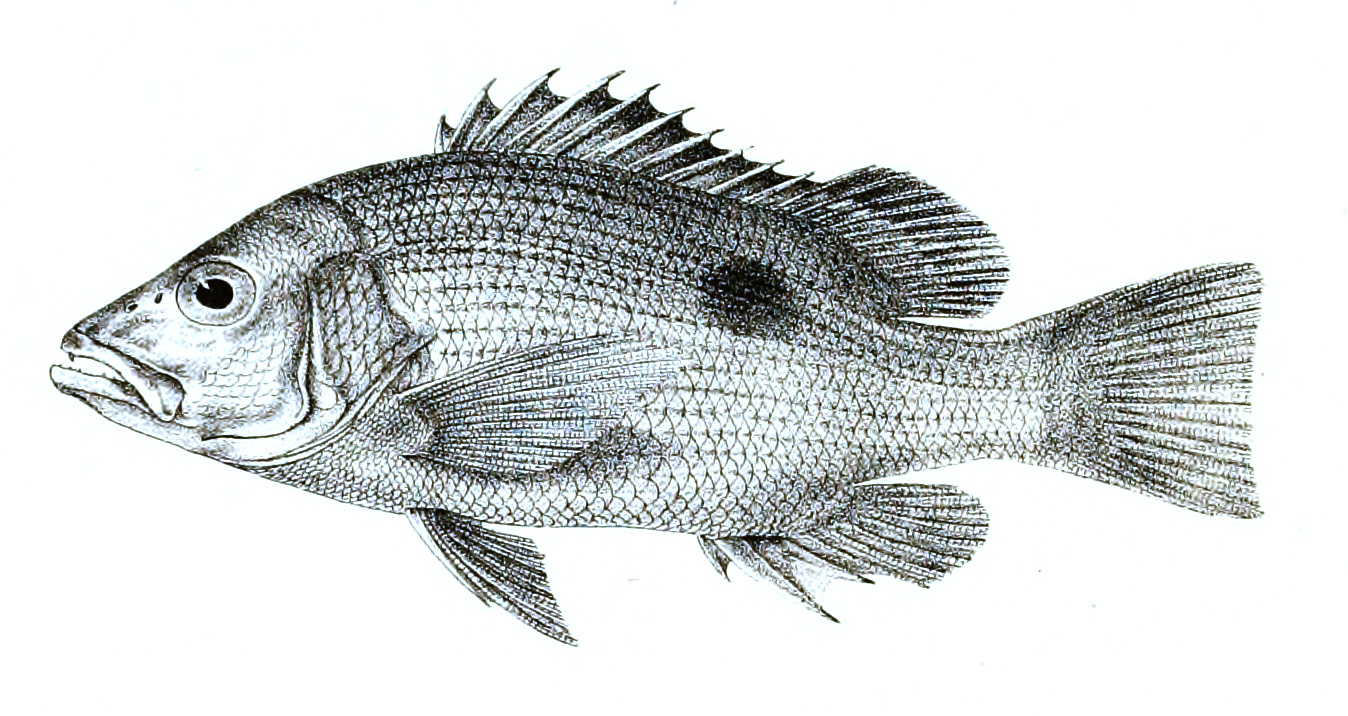
Lutjanus jonii also known as John's snapper is the type host of Microcotyle jonii

The type-host is Lutjanus jonii also known as John's snapper (Lutjanidae). The type-locality is off Pakistan.
