= Microcotyle peprili =

Scientific classification
- Kingdom: Animalia
- Phylum: Platyhelminthes
- Class: Monogenea
- Order: Mazocraeidea
- Family: Microcotylidae
- Genus: Microcotyle
- Species: M. peprili

Binomial name
- Microcotyle peprili Pearse, 1949

Synonyms
- Microcotyle (Microcotyle) peprili (Pearse, 1949) Unnithan, 1971

Species of worm

Microcotyle peprili is a species of monogenean, parasitic on the gills of a marine fish. It belongs to the family Microcotylidae.

== Systematics ==
Microcotyle peprili was first described based on a single specimen from the gill of a single host. This species was placed in the nominal subgenus Microcotyle as Microcotyle (Microcotyle) peprili. However, this combination was suppressed. Due to the lack of detail in the original description, Microcotyle peprili was redescribed and illustrated based on 10 specimens from the type-host off Chesapeake Bay. McMahon added some anatomical features not noted in the distorted type-specimen.

== Morphology ==
Microcotyle peprili has the general morphology of all species of Microcotyle, with an elongate fusiform body tapered toward the anterior end and the haptor-bearing region, provided with a thin and smooth tegument, comprising an anterior part which contains most organs and a posterior part called the haptor. The tapering haptor is 0.12 mm long, and bears about 175 clamps similar in shape, arranged as two rows, one on each side. The clamps of the haptor attach the animal to the gill of the fish. There are also two lateral muscular buccal suckers anterior to the pharynx at the anterior extremity. The digestive organs include an anterior, terminal mouth, a spherical pharynx, an esophagus extending just posterior to the genital atrium, and a posterior intestine with two lateral branches ramified laterally and fusing in a single peduncle that extends into the haptor. Each adult contains male and female reproductive organs. The reproductive organs include a genital atrium, armed with numerous conical spines arranged in concentric circles, opening near anterior end, a single relatively long ovary, a uterus, vitelline glands that extends along both sides from the genital atrium to the beginning of the haptor and are joined posteriorly, and 13-24 testes which are posterior to the ovary. The eggs are elongate with a short filament at both poles.

== Etymology ==
The specific name peprili is derived from the generic name of the host species Peprilus paru (currently Peprilus alepidotus).

== Diagnosis ==
According to Pearse (1949), Microcotyle peprili can be differentiated from other species of the genus Microcotyle by the number of clamps, characters of the haptor and by the spines of the genital atrium.

== Hosts, localities ==
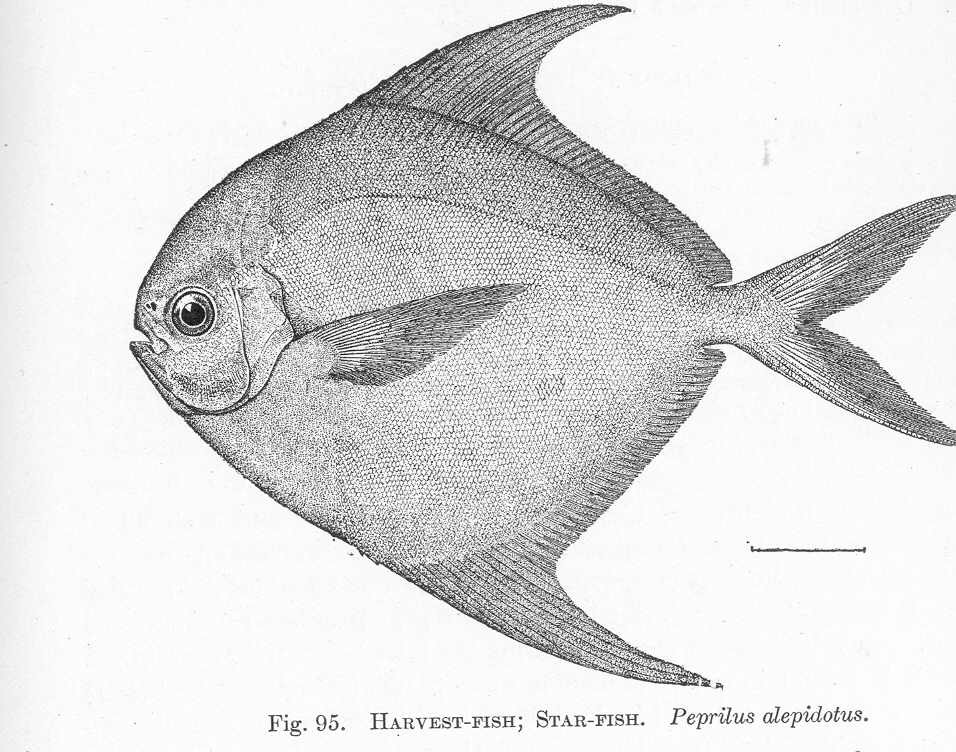
The type-host of Microcotyle peprili is the American harvestfish Peprilus alepidotus

The American harvestfish Peprilus alepidotus (Stromateidae) (currently Peprilus paru) is the type and only recorded host of Microcotyle peprili. Microcotyle peprili has been first described from fish caught off North Carolina. It was also reported from the Chesapeake Bay.
