= Microcotyle fistulariae =

Scientific classification
- Kingdom: Animalia
- Phylum: Platyhelminthes
- Class: Monogenea
- Order: Mazocraeidea
- Family: Microcotylidae
- Genus: Microcotyle
- Species: M. fistulariae

Binomial name
- Microcotyle fistulariae Mamaev, 1989

Species of worms

Microcotyle fistulariae is a species of monogenean, parasitic on the gills of a marine fish. It belongs to the family Microcotylidae.

== Morphology ==
Microcotyle fistulariae has the general morphology of all species of Microcotyle, with a flat body, comprising an anterior part which contains most organs and a posterior part called the haptor. The haptor is symmetrical and bears a number of clamps, arranged as two rows, one on each side. The clamps of the haptor attach the animal to the gill of the fish. There are also two small buccal suckers at the anterior extremity. The digestive organs include an anterior, terminal mouth, a muscular pharynx, and a posterior intestine with two lateral blind-ending branches. Each adult contains male and female reproductive organs. The reproductive organs include an anterior genital atrium, with spines, a dorsal vagina, a single ovary, and a number of testes which are posterior to the ovary.

== Hosts and localities ==
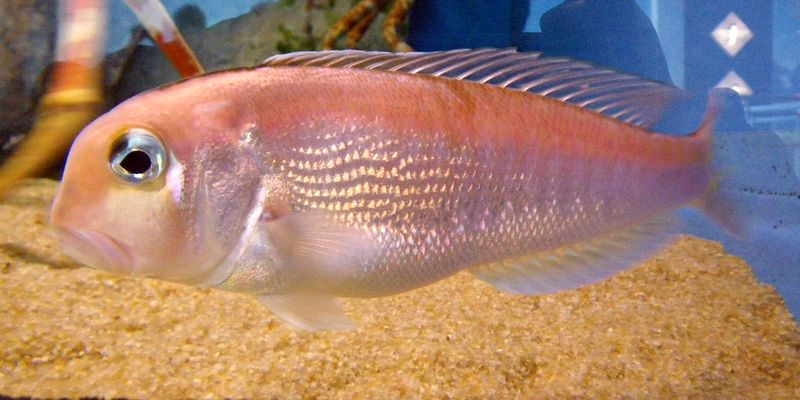
Fistularia petimba is the type host of Microcotyle fistulariae

The type-host is Fistularia petimba (Fistulariidae). The type-locality is the South China Sea.
