= Microcotyle tanago =

Scientific classification
- Kingdom: Animalia
- Phylum: Platyhelminthes
- Class: Monogenea
- Order: Mazocraeidea
- Family: Microcotylidae
- Genus: Microcotyle
- Species: M. tanago

Binomial name
- Microcotyle tanago Yamaguti, 1940

Synonyms
- Paramicrocotyle tanago (Yamaguti, 1940) Caballero & Bravo-Hollis, 1972

Species of worm

Microcotyle tanago is a species of monogenean, parasitic on the gills of a marine fish. It belongs to the family Microcotylidae.

== Taxonomy ==
Microcotyle tanago was first described by Yamaguti in 1940 based on a single mature specimen. Caballero y Caballero and Bravo-Hollis erected the genus Paramicrocotyle to describe Paramicrocotyle tampicensis and Paramicrocotyle atriobursata off Mexico, they placed within this genus 16 species previously assigned to the genus Microcotyle including M. tanago. It was returned to the genus Microcotyle by Mamaev who considered Paramicrocotyle a junior subjective synonym of Microcotyle.

== Hosts and localities ==
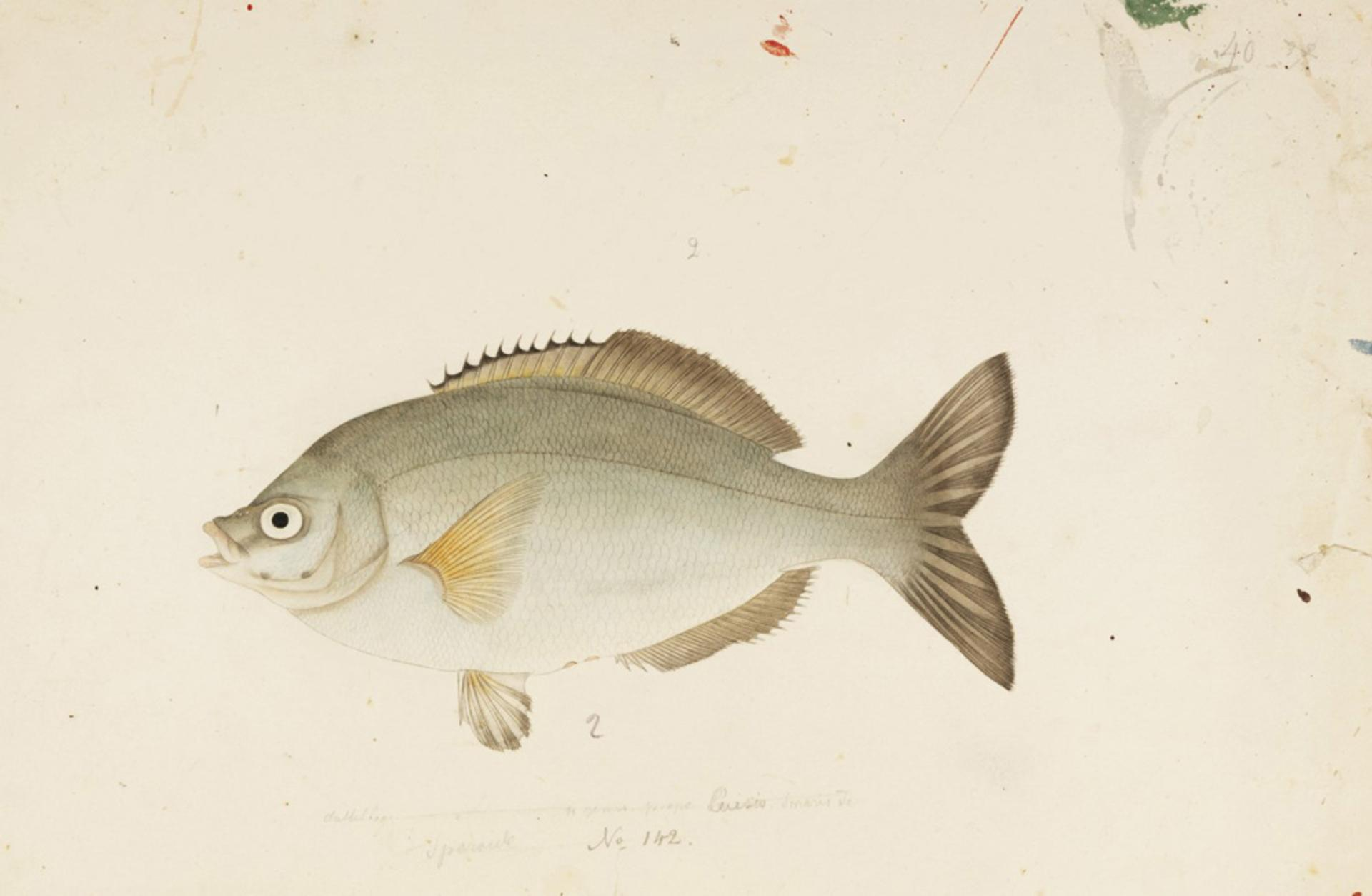
The type-host of Microcotyle tanago is Ditrema temminckii temminckii

The type-host of Microcotyle tanago is Ditrema temminckii temminckii (Embiotocidae). The type-locality is off Tarumi, Japan.
