= Microcotyle longirostri =

Scientific classification
- Kingdom: Animalia
- Phylum: Platyhelminthes
- Class: Monogenea
- Order: Mazocraeidea
- Family: Microcotylidae
- Genus: Microcotyle
- Species: M. longirostri

Binomial name
- Microcotyle longirostri Robinson, 1961

Synonyms
- Gonoplasius longirostri (Robinson, 1961) Price, 1962; Gonoplasius carangis (Robinson, 1961) Barton et al.

Species of worms

Microcotyle longirostri is a species of monogenean, parasitic on the gills of a marine fish. It belongs to the family Microcotylidae.

== Systematics ==
Microcotyle longirostri was described based on four mounted specimens and one sectioned, from the gills of the white trevally (Longirostrum platessa) (currently Pseudocaranx dentex) off New Zealand. The species was transferred to the genus Gonoplasius as Gonoplasius longirostri by Price (1962). Later (2009), Gonoplasius longirostri was synonymised with G. carangis due to the overlap in measurements and similar morphology.

== Description ==
Microcotyle longirostri has the general morphology of all species of Microcotyle, with a symmetrical elongate body, comprising an anterior part which contains most organs and a posterior part called the haptor. The haptor is asymmetrical and wedge-shaped, bears numerous clamps, arranged as two rows, one on each side (7 to 45 clamps on left, 17 to 22 on right). The clamps of the haptor attach the animal to the gill of the fish. There are also two buccal muscular suckers, oval, biloculate with sclerotized papillae, and located at the anterior extremity. The digestive organs include an anterior, terminal mouth, a rounded to oval pharynx, a long and narrow oesophagus extending to posterior margin of the genital atrium and a posterior intestine with two lateral branches provided with numerous secondary branches; the left branch is longer and both branches extend into the haptor. Each adult contains male and female reproductive organs. The reproductive organs include an anterior genital atrium, armed with numerous very spines, a medio-dorsal vagina opening approximately at 1/5 length of body from the anterior end, a single tubular coiled ovary and 54-75 follicular testes which are posterior to the ovary.

== Etymology ==
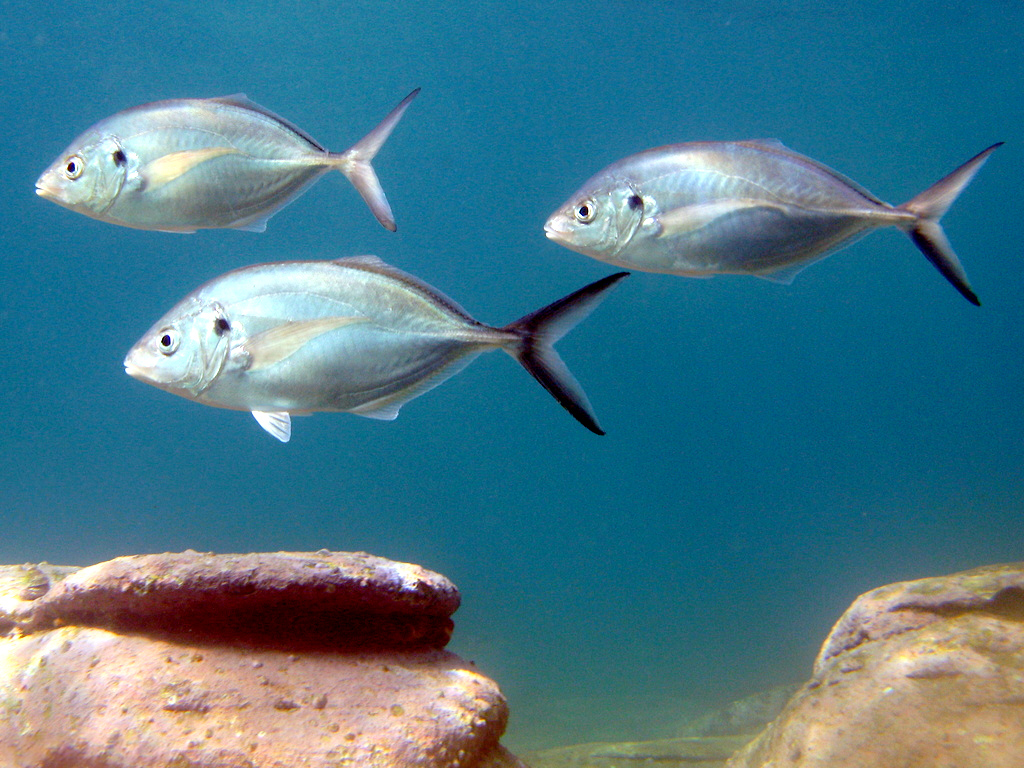
The white trevally Pseudocaranx dentex is the type host of Microcotyle longirostri.

The species name is derived from the generic name of the type-host Longirostrum platessa (Carangidae) (currently Pseudocaranx dentex).

== Hosts and localities ==
The type-host of Microcotyle longirostri is the white trevally Pseudocaranx dentex. The type-locality is off New Zealand. The type-host was synonymised with Pseudocaranx dentex. Gonoplasius longirostri was listed from Caranx lutescens ascribed to Lebedev (1968) and Caranx adscensions (a misspelling of Caranx ascensionis) ascribed as a personal communication from Mamaev, both of which are now synonyms of Pseudocaranx dentex.
