= Microcotyle korathai =

Scientific classification
- Kingdom: Animalia
- Phylum: Platyhelminthes
- Class: Monogenea
- Order: Mazocraeidea
- Family: Microcotylidae
- Genus: Microcotyle
- Species: M. korathai

Binomial name
- Microcotyle korathai Gupta & Krishna, 1980

Species of worms

Microcotyle korathai is a species of monogenean, parasitic on the gills of a marine fish. It belongs to the family Microcotylidae. It was first described and illustrated based on 6 specimens from the gills of the Indian mackerel Scomber microlepidotus (Scombridae) off Odisha, India. (The fish host is currently named Rastrelliger kanagurta).

== Description ==
Microcotyle korathai has the general morphology of all species of Microcotyle, with an elongate symmetrical body, tapering at both ends and comprising an anterior part which contains most organs and a posterior part called the haptor. The haptor is asymmetrical, bilateral, and bears numerous clamps, arranged as two rows, one on each side (29-37 clamps on one side and 30-42 on the other side). The clamps of the haptor attach the animal to the gill of the fish. There are also two spherical buccal suckers at the anterior extremity. The digestive organs include an anterior, terminal mouth, an ovoid muscular pharynx ying just behind oral suckers, an oesophagus and a posterior intestine divided in two branches, not confluent posteriorly, extending into the hohaptor. Each adult contains male and female reproductive organs. The reproductive organs include an anterior postbifurcal genital atrium, armed with numerous very spines, a single looped ovary with its distal end directed anteriorly and 21-24 testes which are posterior to the ovary. The Egg is oval and filamented at each pole.

== Etymology ==
Microcotyle korathai was named in honour of "Dr. K. J. Koratha, from the University of Southern California".

== Hosts and localities ==
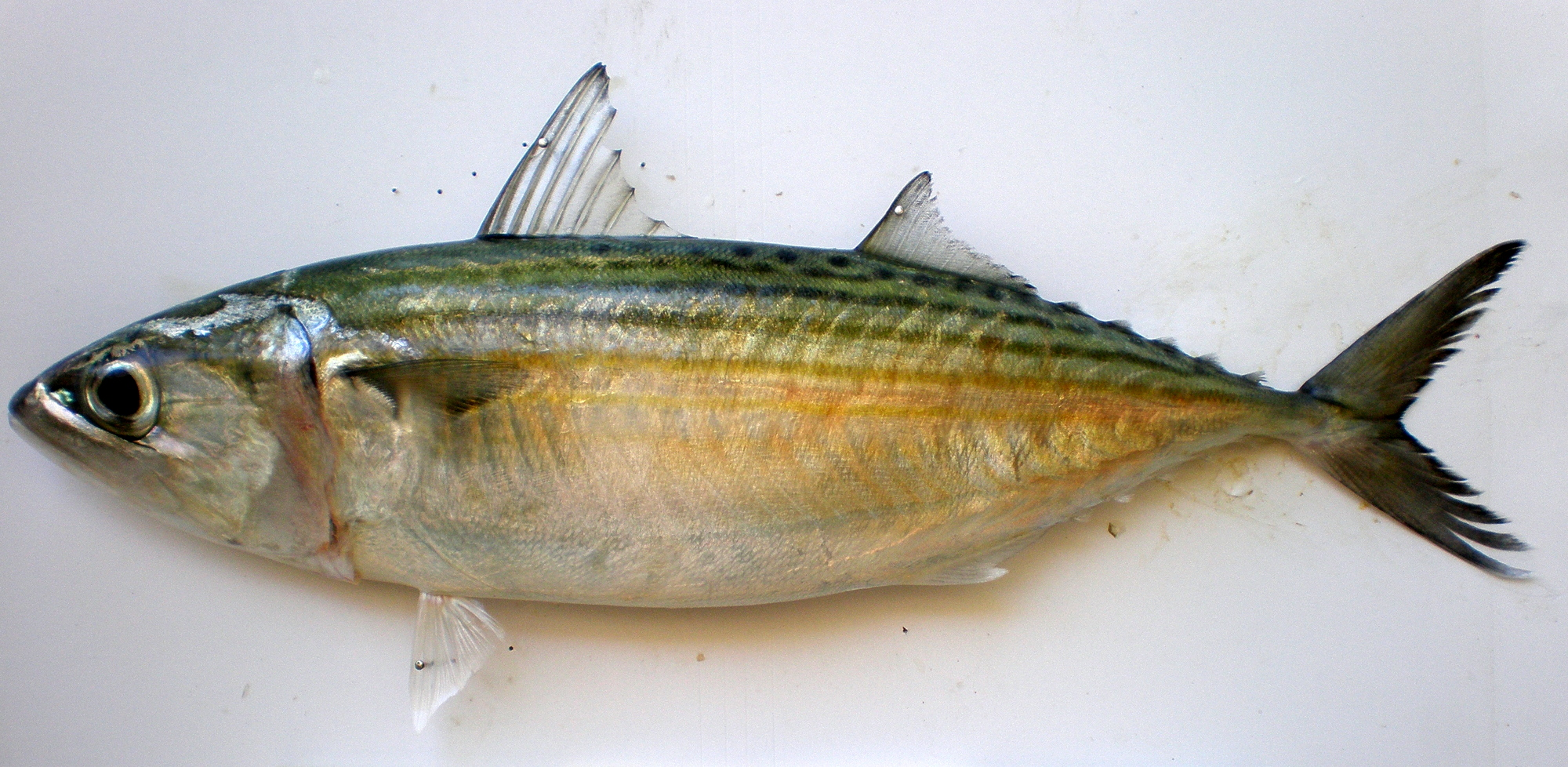
The Indian mackerel Rastrelliger kanagurta is the type-host of Microcotyle korathai

The type-host of Microcotyle korathai is the Indian mackerel Rastrelliger kanagurta (Scombridae). The type-locality is off India.
