= Microcotyle stenotomi =

Scientific classification
- Kingdom: Animalia
- Phylum: Platyhelminthes
- Class: Monogenea
- Order: Mazocraeidea
- Family: Microcotylidae
- Genus: Microcotyle
- Species: M. stenotomi

Binomial name
- Microcotyle stenotomi Goto, 1899

Species of worm

Microcotyle stenotomi is a species of monogenean that is parasitic on the gills of a marine fish. It belongs to the family Microcotylidae and was first described by Goto in 1899.

== Systematics ==
Microcotyle stenotomi was first described by Goto in 1899. The drawings given in the original account lack detail and clarity. Microcotyle stenotomi was subsequently redescribed by Linton in 1940 who added only a few measurements without improving the original drawings of Goto. McMahon noted the lack of some quantitative features in the original account and the necessity of a redescription of the species.

== Morphology ==
Microcotyle stenotomi has the general morphology of all species of Microcotyle, with a symmetrical, narrow body, comprising an anterior part which contains most organs and a posterior part called the haptor. The haptor is symmetrical, occupies about one-third of body length and bears 46 pairs of minute clamps, arranged as two rows, one on each side. The clamps of the haptor attach the animal to the gill of the fish. There are also two small buccal suckers at the anterior extremity. The digestive organs include an anterior, terminal mouth, a muscular pharynx, a short oesophagus and a posterior intestine with two lateral branches provided with numerous secondary branches on the outer side and very short diverticula on the inner side. Each adult contains male and female reproductive organs. The reproductive organs include an anterior spacious genital atrium opening at level of oesophagus, armed with numerous very small and slightly recurved spines, a medio-dorsal vagina opening midway between the anterior end of the body and the level of the ovary, a single incompletely S-shaped ovary consisting of a convoluted tube, a uterus opening through the genital pore, vitellarium giving off ducts which unite in a Y-shaped reservoir in the midline behind the ovary, an oviduct at the tip of the Y-shaped vitelline reservoir and several testes which are posterior to the ovary and present in a great group in the midpart of the body.

== Etymology ==
The specific name stenotomi refers to the generic name of the host species Stenotomus chrysops.

== Hosts, localities, and distribution of the host ==
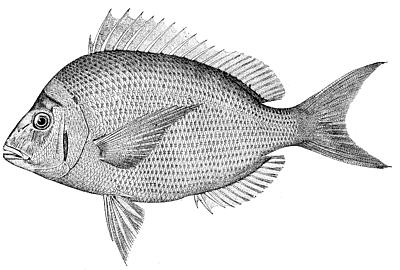
The type-host of Microcotyle stenotomi is the Scup Stenotomus chrysops

The Scup Stenotomus chrysops (Sparidae) is the type and only recorded host of Microcotyle stenotomi. The species was first described from fish caught off Japan. It has also been reported from New York and from off Cape Hatteras. Suydam investigated its micro-ecology and its distribution on the gills of the host.

== Fertilization and elaboration of eggs ==
In 1913, Maccallum described the process of fertilization and egg-laying of this species: "After a certain amount of friction together, one adult attached by its anterior end (where the genital atrium is located) to the corresponding portion of the other (in the position of the vaginal opening is situated). As the cirrus and surrounding genital opening are provided with circles of spines, the animals can preserve their position during fertilization. The spermatozoa pass through the Y-shaped reservoir of the vitellaria and are stored in the seminal reservoir to be ejected when required. When the mature large eggs leave the ovary to join the uterus, the seminal reservoir contracts to inject an opaline fluid into the oviduct toward the oncoming egg. The egg advances to come in contact with the seminal fluid. Then it passes along the common duct that receives a granular yellowish fluid that ends up surrounding the egg. The egg then passes into the ootype. By a vermicular moulding process, the yolk is arranged around the egg, which begins to take its form. Once properly shaped, the egg passes along to the muscular portion of the uterine canal, where the openings of the shell gland. These glands produce a fluid over the surface of the egg and form the shell, giving a completed egg except the filaments. The latest are formed by the contractions of the uterus on the soft material. The completed egg passes to the distal part of the uterus and remains in it until it is deposited".
