= Microcotyle zalembius =

Scientific classification
- Kingdom: Animalia
- Phylum: Platyhelminthes
- Class: Monogenea
- Order: Mazocraeidea
- Family: Microcotylidae
- Genus: Microcotyle
- Species: M. zalembius

Binomial name
- Microcotyle zalembius Crane, 1972

Species of worms

Microcotyle zalembius is a species of monogenean, parasitic on the gills of a marine fish. It belongs to the family Microcotylidae. It was first described and illustrated based on 43 specimens from the gills of the pink seaperch Zalembius rosaceus (Embiotocidae) off San Pedro, California.

== Description ==
Microcotyle zalembius has the general morphology of all species of Microcotyle, with a symmetrical slender body, comprising an anterior part which contains most organs and a posterior part called the haptor. The haptor is asymmetrical, and bears 20-64 clamps, arranged as two rows, one on each side. The clamps of the haptor attach the animal to the gill of the fish. There are also two buccal suckers oval, unarmed, and located at the anterior extremity. The digestive organs include an anterior, terminal mouth, a spheroid pharynx, a simple oesophagus and a posterior intestine bifurcates posterior to genital atrium into two lateral branches provided with numerous secondary branches, the branches are confluent in posterior region of body proper, only one intestinal branch enters the haptor to about one-half total distance Each adult contains male and female reproductive organs. The reproductive organs include an anterior genital atrium, armed with numerous thorn-shaped spines, a medio-dorsal vagina opening approximately one fourth to one-fifth length of body from anterior end, a single tubular, irregularly looped ovary and 20-30 testes irregular in shape, closely packed and occupy the greatest part of the postovarian interintestinal field.

== Etymology ==
The species name is derived from the specific name of the type-host Zalembius rosaceus.

== Hosts and localities ==
The type-host and only recorded host is the pink seaperch Zalembius rosaceus (Embiotocidae). The type and only reported locality is off California.
