= Microcotyle moyanoi =

Scientific classification
- Kingdom: Animalia
- Phylum: Platyhelminthes
- Class: Monogenea
- Order: Mazocraeidea
- Family: Microcotylidae
- Genus: Microcotyle
- Species: M. moyanoi

Binomial name
- Microcotyle moyanoi (Villalba & Fernandes, 1986) Bouguerche, Gey, Justine & Tazerouti, 2019

Synonyms
- Paramicrocotyle moyanoi (Villalba & Fernandes, 1986)

Species of worms

Microcotyle moyanoi is a species of monogenean, parasitic on the gills of a marine fish. It belongs to the family Microcotylidae.

== Systematics ==
Microcotyle moyanoi was first described and illustrated based on specimens from the gills off the Chilean sandperch Pinguipes chilensis (Pinguipedidae ) off Chile. In the original description, this species was placed in Paramicrocotyle, a genus erected for P. atriobursata and P. tampicensis and distinguished from Microcotyle by the following features: structure of the haptor, structure and shape of the genital atrium and the presence of two vitellovaginal pouches. 16 species previously belonging to the genus Microcotyle were placed in this newly erected genus . Later, Mamaev (1986) synonymised Paramicrocotyle with Microcotyle, and Paramicrocotyle was considered taxon inquirendum. Mamaev (1986) did not change the generic status of P. danielcarrioni, described simultaneously to his study.

Based on morphological similarities between the genus: Microcotyle and Paramicrocotyle, Bouguerche et al., followed Mamaev (1986) and considered Paramicrocotyle a junior synonym of Microcotyle as their molecular analyses included a member of Paramicrocotyle placed amongst other species of Microcotyle without having a distinct branch. Paramicrocotyle moyanoi was transferred to the genus Microcotyle.

== Description ==
Microcotyle moyanoi has the general morphology of all species of Microcotyle, with a symmetrical body, comprising an anterior part which contains most organs and a posterior part called the haptor. The haptor is symmetrical, and bears clamps, arranged as two rows, one on each side. The clamps of the haptor attach the animal to the gill of the fish. There are also two buccal suckers at the anterior extremity. The digestive organs include an anterior, terminal mouth, a pharynx, an oesophagus and a posterior intestine with two lateral branches provided with numerous secondary branches. Each adult contains male and female reproductive organs. The reproductive organs include an anterior genital atrium, armed with numerous very spines, a medio-dorsal vagina, a single ovary and a number of testes which are posterior to the ovary.

== Hosts and localities ==
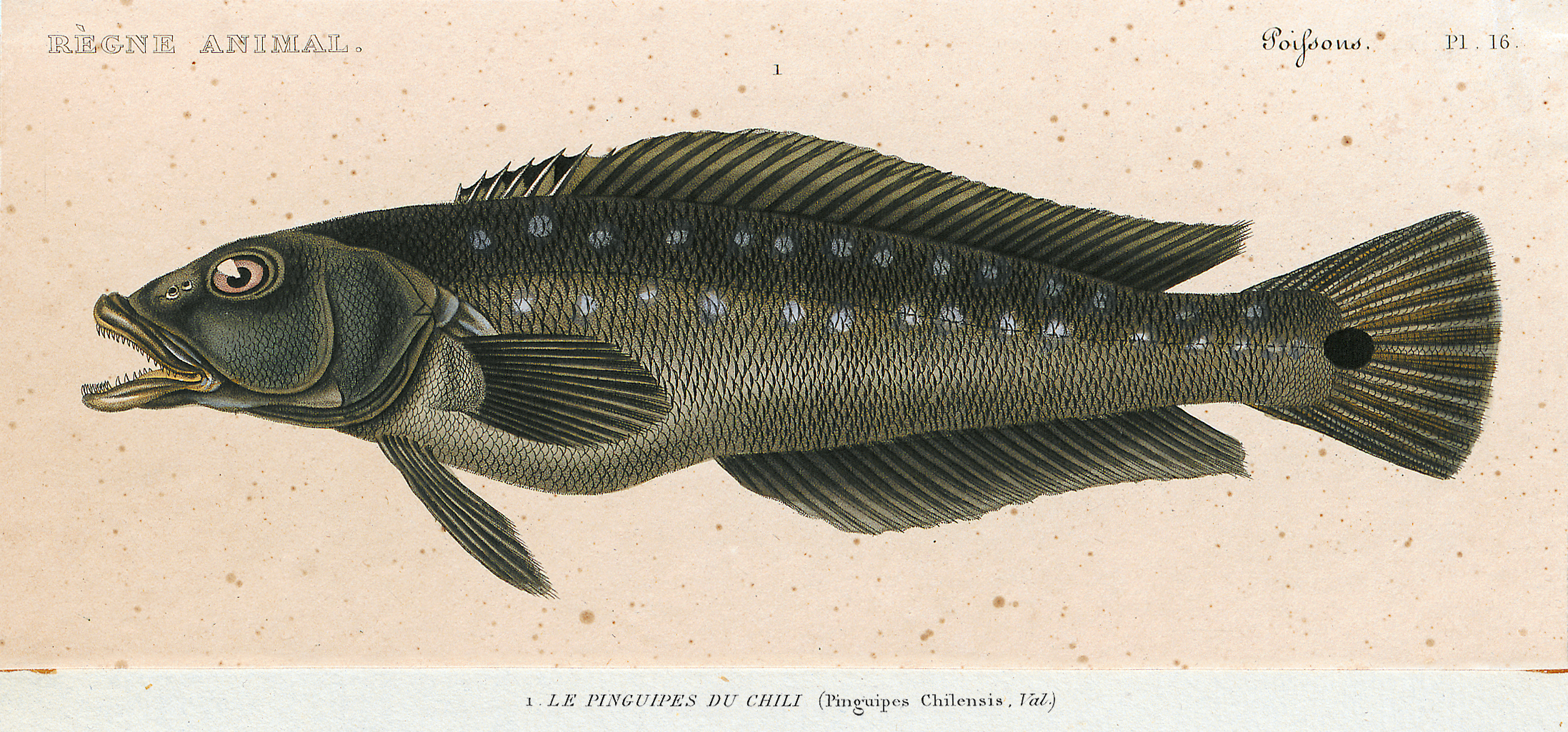
The Chilean sandperch Pinguipes chilensis is type-host of Microcotyle moyanoi

The type-host is the Chilean sandperch Pinguipes chilensis (Pinguipedidae) referred to as Mugiloides chilensis in the original description. It was also reported on Bovichtus chilensis (Bovichtidae). Microcotyle moyanoi was first described from fishes caught off Chile. It was reported again off the type locality.
