= Microcotyle pentapodi =

Scientific classification
- Kingdom: Animalia
- Phylum: Platyhelminthes
- Class: Monogenea
- Order: Mazocraeidea
- Family: Microcotylidae
- Genus: Microcotyle
- Species: M. pentapodi

Binomial name
- Microcotyle pentapodi Sandars, 1944

Synonyms
- Paramicrocotyle pentapodi (Sandars, 1944) Caballero & Bravo-Hollis, 1972

Species of worm

Microcotyle pentapodi is a species of monogenean, parasitic on the gills of a marine fish. It belongs to the family Microcotylidae.

== Systematics ==
Microcotyle pentapodi was first described and illustrated from the gills of Pentapodus milii off Rockingham, Australia. Caballero y Caballero and Bravo-Hollis erected the genus Paramicrocotyle to describe Paramicrocotyle tampicensis and Paramicrocotyle atriobursata off Mexico, and placed within this genus 16 species previously assigned to the genus Microcotyle including M. pentapodi. This species was returned to the genus Microcotyle and Paramicrocotyle is considered a junior subjective synonym of Microcotyle.

== Description ==
Microcotyle pentapodi has the general morphology of all species of Microcotyle, with a small elongated slender body, comprising an anterior part which contains most organs and a posterior part called the haptor. The haptor is symmetrical, and bears clamps, arranged as two rows, one on each side. The clamps of the haptor attach the animal to the gill of the fish. There are also two septate buccal suckers at the anterior extremity. The digestive organs include an anterior, terminal mouth, a pharynx, an oesophagus and a posterior intestine with two lateral branches provided with numerous secondary branches. Each adult contains male and female reproductive organs. The reproductive organs include an anterior genital atrium bifurcating immediately behind the genital atrium, armed with numerous spines, a medio-dorsal vagina, a single ovary and a number of circular testes which are posterior to the ovary. The eggs are oval.

== Etymology ==
The species name pentapodi is derived from the generic name of the type-host, Pentapodus milii.

== Hosts and localities ==
The type-host of Microcotyle pentapodi is Pentapodus milii. The type locality is off Australia.
