= Microcotyle macropharynx =

Scientific classification
- Kingdom: Animalia
- Phylum: Platyhelminthes
- Class: Monogenea
- Order: Mazocraeidea
- Family: Microcotylidae
- Genus: Microcotyle
- Species: M. macropharynx

Binomial name
- Microcotyle macropharynx Mamaev, 1989

Species of worms

Microcotyle macropharynx is a species of monogenean, parasitic on the gills of a marine fish. It belongs to the family Microcotylidae. It was first described by Mamaev in 1989.

== Morphology ==
Microcotyle macropharynx has the general morphology of all species of Microcotyle, with a symmetrical body, comprising an anterior part which contains most organs and a posterior part called the haptor. The haptor is symmetrical, and bears clamps, arranged as two rows, one on each side. The clamps of the haptor attach the animal to the gill of the fish. There are also two buccal suckers at the anterior extremity. The digestive organs include an anterior, terminal mouth, a pharynx, an oesophagus and a posterior intestine with two lateral branches provided with numerous secondary branches. Each adult contains male and female reproductive organs. The reproductive organs include an anterior genital atrium, armed with numerous very spines, a medio-dorsal vagina, a single ovary and a number of testes which are posterior to the ovary.

== Hosts and localities ==
Microcotyle macropharynx was reported from Pseudopentaceros wheeleri (Pentacerotidae) off Hawaï. Humphreys (1993) investigated new recruits to a seamount population of this host using Microcotyle macropharynx.
