= Microcotyle pacifica =

Scientific classification
- Kingdom: Animalia
- Phylum: Platyhelminthes
- Class: Monogenea
- Order: Mazocraeidea
- Family: Microcotylidae
- Genus: Microcotyle
- Species: M. pacifica

Binomial name
- Microcotyle pacifica Crane, 1972

Species of worms

Microcotyle pacifica is a species of monogenean, parasitic on the gills of a marine fish. It belongs to the family Microcotylidae. It was first described an illustrated based on 31 specimens from the gills of the blackbelly eelpout Lycodes pacificus (referred to as Lycodopus pacificus in the original description) off California.

== Description ==
Microcotyle pacifica has the general morphology of all species of Microcotyle, with a symmetrical lanceolat body, comprising an anterior part which contains most organs and a posterior part called the haptor. The haptor is symmetrical, and bears 46-50 clamps, arranged as two rows, one on each side. The clamps of the haptor attach the animal to the gill of the fish. There are also two buccal suckers oval, unarmed, and located at the anterior extremity. The digestive organs include an anterior, terminal mouth, a circular pharynx, a simple oesophagus and a posterior intestine bifurcates immediately posterior to genital atrium into two lateral branches provided with numerous secondary branches, both extends into the hohaptor, and are confluent. Each adult contains male and female reproductive organs. The reproductive organs include an anterior genital atrium, armed with numerous thorn-shaped spines, a medio-dorsal vagina opening approximately one fourth to one-fifth length of body from anterior end, a single tubular, irregularly looped ovary and 18-30 testes irregular in shape, closely packed and occupy the greatest part of the postovarian interintestinal field.

== Etymology ==
The species name is derived from the specific name of the type-host Lycodes pacificus.

== Hosts and localities ==
The type-host and only recorded host is the blackbelly eelpout Lycodes pacificus. The type and only reported locality is off California.
