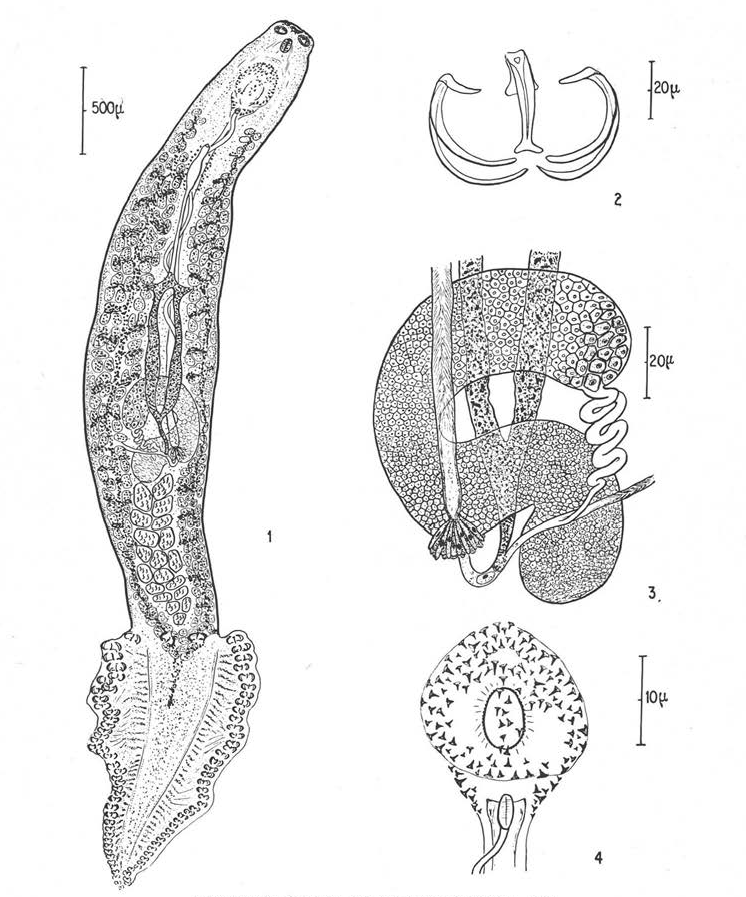
- Microcotyle donavini (Type-species of Microcotyle)

Scientific classification
- Kingdom: Animalia
- Phylum: Platyhelminthes
- Class: Monogenea
- Order: Mazocraeidea
- Family: Microcotylidae
- Subfamily: Microcotylinae
- Genus: Microcotyle; Van Beneden & Hesse, 1863

= Microcotyle =

Genus of flatworms

Microcotyle is a genus which belongs to the phylum Platyhelminthes and class Monogenea. Species of Microcotyle are ectoparasites that affect their host by attaching themselves as larvae on the gills of the fish and grow into adult stage. This larval stage is called oncomiracidium, and is characterized as free swimming and ciliated.

Species of Microcotyle have only one host in their entire life cycle. Different species of Microcotyle inhabit marine and freshwater and they can also infect different species of fishes. They are uniquely characterized by their haptor having a lot of tiny clamps on the lateral margins.

Although not really known to cause that much damage in marine wildlife, some of them are reported to cause agricultural problems like Microcotyle sebastis as an example. Microcotyle sebastis commonly affects Sebastes schlegeli, a maricultured fish in Korea.

== Morphology ==
Individuals of species of Microcotyle, like any typical polyopisthocotylean monogenean, have an anterior organ called prohaptor, which is mainly used for feeding and attachment. Although the prohaptor is not the primary attachment organ, it is used to anchor the body of the parasite while the opisthaptor is being repositioned. The opisthaptor is found in all Microcotyle species and it is an important attachment organ that allows these ectoparasites to latch onto their hosts.

Located at the anterior part of the worm is the funnel-shaped mouth that is connected to the pharynx, followed by the esophagus that is smaller in diameter compared to the pharynx. About one tenth of the entire length of the worm, the esophagus then divides into intestinal crura, which extends further posteriorly. The cruca is divided into pouches, which extend between vitellaria. Vitallaria are glands that secrete yolk around the egg. This digestive pathway is observed to be continuous throughout the entire worm. Food particles were observed to be passing back and forth along these pathways in vivo.

The worms are hermaphroditic, containing both male and female organs. Each worm has reproductive organs such as vas deferens, testis, uterus, vitelline duct, ovary, and vitellaria. They also have flame cells that function as a kidney and remove waste material. A short duct that opens to the outside on the dorsal surface is composed of four canals on each side, two posterior and two anterior, that come together laterally to the cirrus. During observation on immature specimens, these canals can still be seen. However, on adults, these canals are concealed by vitellaria.

== Life cycle ==
Species of Microcotyle have a direct life cycle; no intermediate hosts are needed to complete its life cycle. Marine fishes are the definitive host of these parasites. The adults live on the gill of the fishes as ectoparasites. The eggs are released into water, hatch and develop as oncomiracidium. The oncomiracidia, free swimming form larvae, move around and attach to another fish and grow into adult stage. The life cycle of species of Microcotyle is completed and repeated again and again.

== Treatment ==
Bath treatment using praziquantel is the effective methods of treating Microcotyle sebastis on rockfish. An experiment was done to indicate that feeding a praziquantel-adsorbed diet significantly reduces the abundance of M. sebastis infestation, and bathing in 100 ppm praziquantel for 4 minutes is effective for controlling M. sebastis infestation in a practical rockfish culture system.

== Species ==
According to the World Register of Marine Species, there are more than one hundred species in this genus:

- Microcotyle aigoi Ishii & Sawada, 1938
- Microcotyle algeriensis Ayadi, Gey, Justine & Tazerouti, 2017
- Microcotyle angelichthys MacCallum, 1913
- Microcotyle archosargi MacCallum, 1913
- Microcotyle argenticus Hadi & Bilqees, 2011
- Microcotyle arripis Sandars, 1945
- Microcotyle bassensis Murray, 1931
- Microcotyle bothi Yamaguti, 1968
- Microcotyle branchiostegi Yamaguti, 1937
- Microcotyle brevis Dillon & Hargis, 1965
- Microcotyle caudata Goto, 1984
- Microcotyle centrodonti Brown, 1929
- Microcotyle centropristis MacCallum, 1915.
- Microcotyle cepolae Yamaguti, 1938
- Microcotyle constricta Robinson, 1961
- Microcotyle danielcarrioni (Martinez & Barrantes, 1977) Bouguerche, Gey, Justine and Tazerouti, 2019
- Microcotyle ditrematis Yamaguti, 1940
- Microcotyle donavini Van Beneden & Hesse, 1863
- Microcotyle elegans Goto, 1894
- Microcotyle emmelichthyops Yamaguti, 1968
- Microcotyle erythrini Van Beneden & Hesse, 1863
- Microcotyle eueides MacCallum & MacCallum, 1913
- Microcotyle fistulariae Mamaev, 1989
- Microcotyle furcata Linton, 1940
- Microcotyle fusiformis Goto, 1894
- Microcotyle gimpo Yamaguti, 1958
- Microcotyle guanabarensis Bravo-Hollis & Kohn, 1990
- Microcotyle hainanensis
- Microcotyle helotes Sandars, 1944
- Microcotyle hiatulae Goto, 1899
- Microcotyle inglisi Gupta & Krishna, 1980
- Microcotyle jonii Hadi, Bilqees & Khatoon, 2011
- Microcotyle justinei Ayadi & Tazerouti, 2023
- Microcotyle korathai Gupta & Krishna, 1980
- Microcotyle lichiae Ariola, 1899
- Microcotyle longirostri Robinson, 1961
- Microcotyle macropharynx Mamaev, 1989
- Microcotyle mouwoi Ishii & Sawada, 1938
- Microcotyle moyanoi (Villalba & Fernandes, 1986) Bouguerche, Gey, Justine and Tazerouti, 2019
- Microcotyle nemadactylus Dillon & Hargis, 1965
- Microcotyle neozealanica Dillon & Hargis, 1965
- Microcotyle oceanica Caballero, Bravo-Hollis & Grocott, 1953
- Microcotyle odacis Sandars, 1945
- Microcotyle omani Machkewskyi, Dmitrieva, Al-Jufaili & Al-Mazrooei, 2013
- Microcotyle otrynteri Pearse, 1949
- Microcotyle pacifica Crane, 1972
- Microcotyle pempheri Machida & Azaki, 1977
- Microcotyle pentapodi Sandars, 1944
- Microcotyle peprili Pearse, 1949
- Microcotyle polymixiae Yamaguti, 1968
- Microcotyle pomacanthi MacCallum, 1915
- Microcotyle pomatomi Goto, 1899
- Microcotyle pontica Pogorel'tseva, 1964
- Microcotyle poronoti MacCallum, 1915
- Microcotyle pseudopercis Amato & Cezar, 1994
- Microcotyle rubrum Hadi & Bilqees, 2010
- Microcotyle sebastis Goto, 1894
- Microcotyle sebastisci Yamaguti, 1958
- Microcotyle stenotomi Goto, 1899
- Microcotyle tampicensis (Caballero & Bravo-Hollis, 1972) Mamaev, 1986
- Microcotyle tanago Yamaguti, 1940
- Microcotyle toba Ishii & Sawada, 1938
- Microcotyle victoriae Woolcock, 1936
- Microcotyle visa Bouguerche, Gey, Justine & Tazerouti, 2019
- Microcotyle zalembius Crane, 1972
