= Microcotyle argenticus =

Scientific classification
- Kingdom: Animalia
- Phylum: Platyhelminthes
- Class: Monogenea
- Order: Mazocraeidea
- Family: Microcotylidae
- Genus: Microcotyle
- Species: M. argenticus

Binomial name
- Microcotyle argenticus Hadi & Bilqees, 2011

Species of worms

Microcotyle argenticus is a species of monogenean, parasitic on the gills of a marine fish. It belongs to the family Microcotylidae. It was described from the gills of the silver pomfret Pampus argenteus (Stromateidae) from Karachi coast off Pakistan.

== Description ==
Microcotyle argenticus has the general morphology of all species of Microcotyle, with a symmetrical slender elongated body, comprising an anterior part which contains most organs and a posterior part called the haptor. The haptor is symmetrical, not distinctly marked off from body proper and bears 75-80 clamps, arranged as two rows, one on each side (35-40 on each side). The clamps of the haptor attach the animal to the gill of the fish. There are also two buccal suckers at the anterior extremity. The digestive organs include an anterior, terminal mouth, a muscular pharynx, an oesophagus and a posterior intestine with two lateral branches provided with numerous secondary branches; both branches extends into the haptor. Each adult contains male and female reproductive organs. The reproductive organs include an anterior genital atrium, armed with numerous very spines, a medio-dorsal vagina, a single tube-like ovary and 12 testes which are posterior to the ovary.

== Etymology ==
The species name is derived from the generic name of the type-host Pampus argenteus.

== Hosts and localities ==
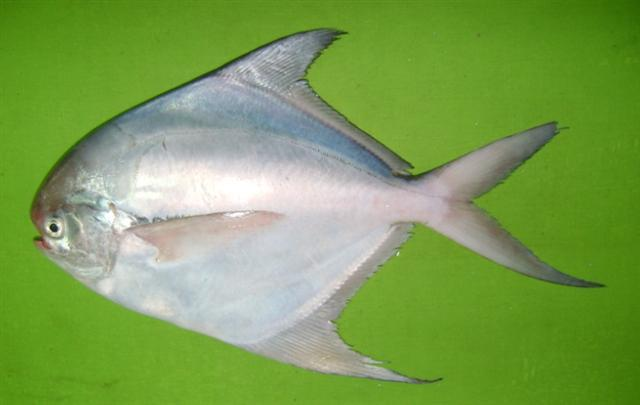
The silver pomfret Pampus argenteus is the type-host of Microcotyle argenticus

The type-host is the silver pomfret Pampus argenteus. The type-locality is Karachi Coast off Pakistan.
