= Microcotyle erythrini =

Scientific classification
- Kingdom: Animalia
- Phylum: Platyhelminthes
- Class: Monogenea
- Order: Mazocraeidea
- Family: Microcotylidae
- Genus: Microcotyle
- Species: M. erythrini

Binomial name
- Microcotyle erythrini Van Beneden & Hesse, 1863

Species of worms

Microcotyle erythrini is a species of monogenean, parasitic on the gills of a marine fish. It belongs to the family Microcotylidae. This species was described by Van Beneden & Hesse in 1863 and redescribed by Parona & Perugia in 1890.

== Hosts and localities ==
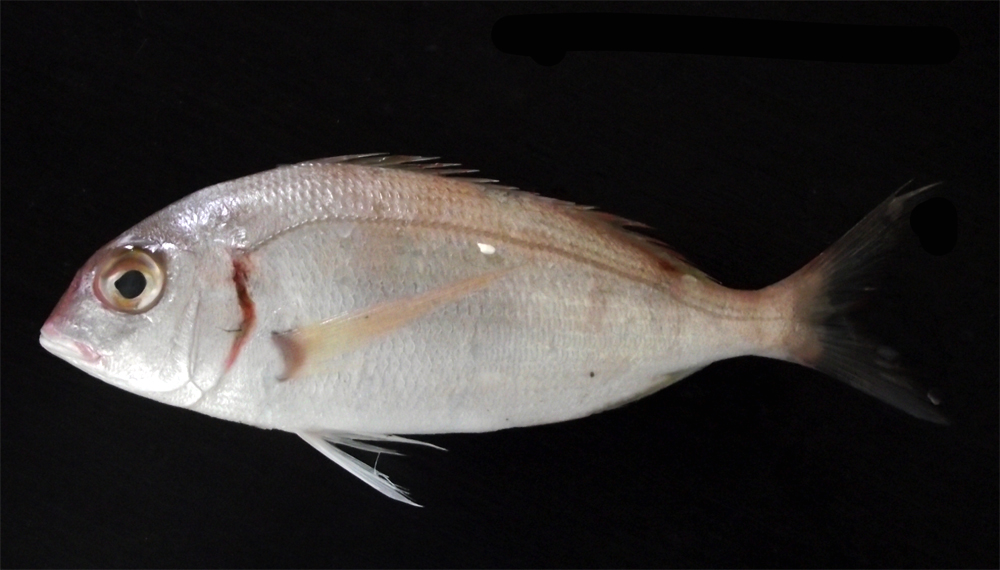
Pagellus erythrinus is the type host of Microcotyle erythrini

The type-host is Pagellus erythrinus. The type-locality is off Brest. The species has been since recorded from three other hosts (Pagellus acarne, Boops boops and Dentex dentex in several localities in the Mediterranean (Montenegro, France, Italy, Algeria, Spain, Turkey) and in the Atlantic, off France and off Spain).
