= Microcotyle oceanica =

Scientific classification
- Kingdom: Animalia
- Phylum: Platyhelminthes
- Class: Monogenea
- Order: Mazocraeidea
- Family: Microcotylidae
- Genus: Microcotyle
- Species: M. oceanica

Binomial name
- Microcotyle oceanica Caballero, Bravo-Hollis & Grocott, 1953

Species of worms

Microcotyle oceanica is a species of monogenean, parasitic on the gills of a marine fish. It belongs to the family Microcotylidae. It was first described and illustrated based on two specimens from the gills of the Mexican needlefish Tylosurus fodiator (Belonidae), off Panama.

== Description ==
Microcotyle oceanica has the general morphology of all species of Microcotyle, with a symmetrical lanceolate body, comprising an anterior part which contains most organs and a posterior part called the haptor. The haptor is asymmetrical, and bears 36 clamps, arranged as two rows, one on each side. The clamps of the haptor attach the animal to the gill of the fish. There are also two oblong buccal suckers at the anterior extremity. The digestive organs include an anterior, terminal mouth, an ovoid small pharynx, a long narrow oesophagus and a narrow posterior intestine with two lateral branches provided with numerous secondary branches; the intestine extends to the base of the haptor. Each adult contains male and female reproductive organs. The reproductive organs include an anterior genital atrium, armed with numerous very spines, a medio-dorsal vagina, a single large ovary and 51 to 58 ovoid testes located in the posterior part of the body, in the intercecal area, in two rows.

== Hosts and localities ==
The host-type is the Mexican needlefish Tylosurus fodiator (Belonidae). The type-locality is off Panama.
