= Microcotyle eueides =

Scientific classification
- Kingdom: Animalia
- Phylum: Platyhelminthes
- Class: Monogenea
- Order: Mazocraeidea
- Family: Microcotylidae
- Genus: Microcotyle
- Species: M. eueides

Binomial name
- Microcotyle eueides MacCallum & MacCallum, 1913

Synonyms
- Caenomicrocotyle (Caenomicrocotyle) eueides (MacCallum & MacCallum, 1913) Unnithan1971

Species of worms

Microcotyle eueides is a species of monogenean, parasitic on the gills of a marine fish. It belongs to the family Microcotylidae.

== Systematics ==
Microcotyle eueides was first described by MacCallum & MacCallum (1913) from the gills of the striped bass Morone saxatilis (Moronidae), designated as Roccus lineatus in the original publication. Unnithan (1971) placed M. eueides in the new genus and subgenus Caenomicrocotyle as Caenomicrocotyle (Caenomicrocotyle) eueides. However, this species was returned to the genus Microcotyle by Mamaev in 1986.

== Morphology ==
Microcotyle eueides has the general morphology of all species of Microcotyle, with a symmetrical very delicate and thin body, narrowed at each end and comprising an anterior part which contains most organs and a posterior part called the haptor. The haptor is symmetrical, and bears clamps, arranged as two rows, one on each side. The clamps of the haptor attach the animal to the gill of the fish. There are also two buccal lateral, imperforate suckers at the anterior extremity. The digestive organs include an anterior, terminal mouth, a small and inconspicuous pharynx, an oesophagus and a posterior intestine with two lateral branches provided with numerous secondary branches; the branches extends far back into the haptor. Each adult contains male and female reproductive organs. The reproductive organs include an anterior genital atrium, armed with numerous spines, a medio-dorsal vagina, a single large ovary coiled across the middle of the body and 32 small testes which are posterior to the ovary. The eggs are elliptical, with a very long and delicate anterior filament that becomes coiled in a dense mass just near the opening of the uterus.

== Hosts and localities ==
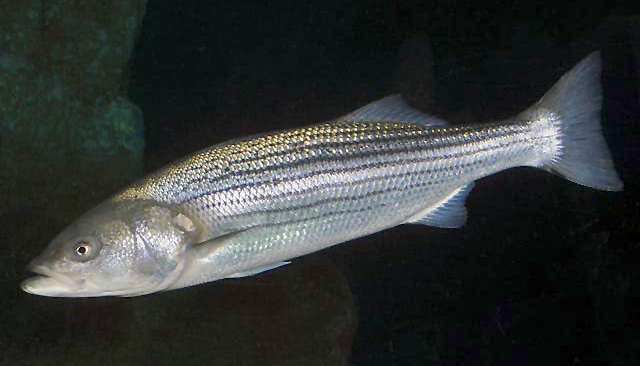
The striped bassMorone saxatilisis the type host of Microcotyle eueides

The type-host is the striped bass (Morone saxatilis) (Moronidae), designated as Roccus lineatus in the original publication. The type-locality is New York.
