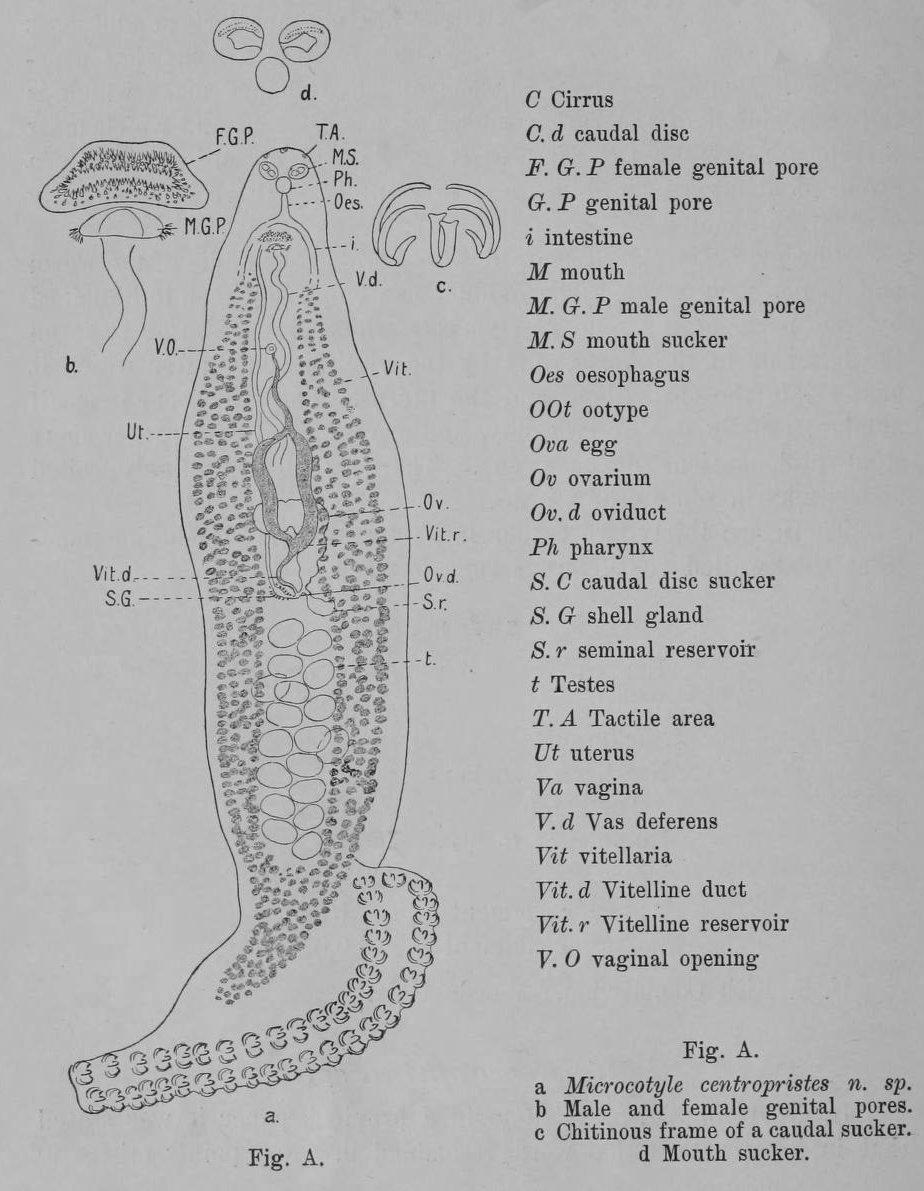
- Microcotyle centropristis, original description

Scientific classification
- Kingdom: Animalia
- Phylum: Platyhelminthes
- Class: Monogenea
- Order: Mazocraeidea
- Family: Microcotylidae
- Genus: Microcotyle
- Species: M. centropristis

Binomial name
- Microcotyle centropristis MacCallum, 1915

Synonyms
- Microcotyle (Microcotyle) centropristis (MacCallum, 1915) Unnithan1971; Paramicrocotyle centropristis (MacCallum, 1915) Caballero & Bravo-Hollis, 1972

= Microcotyle centropristis =

Species of worms

Microcotyle centropristis is a species of monogenean, parasitic on the gills of a marine fish. It belongs to the family Microcotylidae.

== Taxonomy ==
Microcotyle centropristis was first described by MacCallum in 1915 based on few specimens from the gills of the black seabass Centropristis striata (Serranidae), from New York fish market. Unnithan (1971) placed M. centropristis in the nominal subgenus Microcotyle as Microcotyle (Microcotyle) centropristis. In 1972, Caballero y Caballero and Bravo-Hollis erected the genus Paramicrocotyle to describe Paramicrocotyle tampicensis and Paramicrocotyle atriobursata off Mexico, they placed within this genus sixteen species previously assigned to the genus Microcotyle including M. centropristis. However, these two species were returned to the genus Microcotyle by Mamaev.

== Morphology ==
Microcotyle centropristis has the general morphology of all species of Microcotyle, with a symmetrical body, comprising an anterior part which contains most organs and a posterior part called the haptor. The short haptor is symmetrical, and bears clamps, arranged as two rows, one on each side. The clamps of the haptor attach the animal to the gill of the fish. There are also two relatively large and round buccal suckers provided with a row of minute teeth and located at the anterior extremity. The digestive organs include an anterior, terminal mouth, a muscular pharynx, a long oesophagus and a posterior intestine with two lateral branches provided with numerous secondary branches. Each adult contains male and female reproductive organs. The reproductive organs include an anterior genital atrium, armed with numerous fine sharply pointed spines directed inward and upward, a medio-dorsal vagina, a single ovary indistinctly outlined and a number of testes which are posterior to the ovary. The eggs have a very short spur-like processes at each end, instead of filaments, or are rounded at the ends.

== Hosts and localities ==
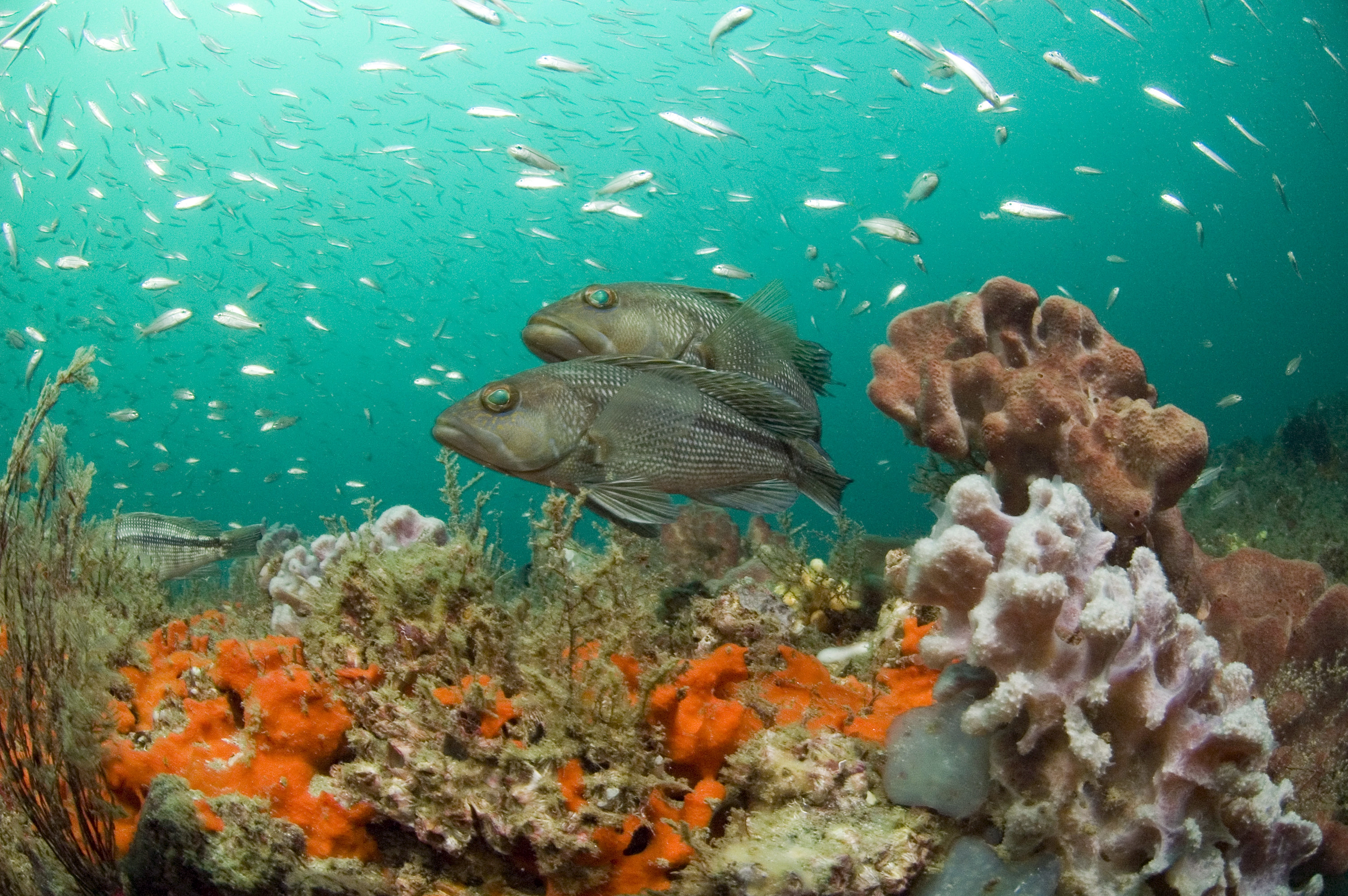
The black seabass Centropristis striata is the type host of Microcotyle centropristis

The host-type is the black seabass Centropristis striata (Serranidae). The type-locality is the New York fish market.
