= Microcotyle danielcarrioni =

Scientific classification
- Kingdom: Animalia
- Phylum: Platyhelminthes
- Class: Monogenea
- Order: Mazocraeidea
- Family: Microcotylidae
- Genus: Microcotyle
- Species: M. danielcarrioni

Binomial name
- Microcotyle danielcarrioni (Martinez & Barrantes, 1977) Bouguerche, Gey, Justine & Tazerouti, 2019

Synonyms
- Paramicrocotyle danielcarrioni Martinez & Barrantes, 1977

Species of worms

Microcotyle danielcarrioni is a species of monogenean, parasitic on the gills of a marine fish. It belongs to the family Microcotylidae.

== Systematics ==
Microcotyle danielcarrioni was first described and illustrated based on specimens from the gills of the Peruvian morwong Cheilodactylus variegatus (Cheilodactylidae) off Peru, without referring to holotype number. In the original description, this species was placed in the genus Paramicrocotyle, a genus erected for P. atriobursata and P. tampicensis and distinguished from Microcotyle by the following features: structure of the haptor, structure and shape of the genital atrium and the presence of two vitellovaginal pouches. Sixteen species previously belonging to the genus Microcotyle were placed in this newly erected genus. Later, Mamaev (1986) synonymised Paramicrocotyle with Microcotyle, and Paramicrocotyle was considered taxon inquirendum. Mamaev (1986) did not change the generic status of P. danielcarrioni, probably omitted. Oliva & Munoz (1985) suggested that Microcotyle danielcarrioni was a synonym of Microcotyle nemadactylus, but retained it in the genus Paramicrocotyle. Based on morphological similarities between the genus: Microcotyle and Paramicrocotyle, Bouguerche et al., followed Mamaev (1986) and considered Paramicrocotyle a junior synonym of Microcotyleas their molecular analyses included a member of Paramicrocotyle which was placed amongst other species of Microcotyle without having a distinct branch. Paramicrocotyle danielcarrioni was thus transferred to the genus Microcotyle.

== Description ==
Microcotyle danielcarrioni has the general morphology of all species of Microcotyle, with a symmetrical body, comprising an anterior part which contains most organs and a posterior part called the haptor. The haptor is symmetrical, and bears clamps, arranged as two rows, one on each side. The clamps of the haptor attach the animal to the gill of the fish. There are also two buccal suckers at the anterior extremity. The digestive organs include an anterior, terminal mouth, a pharynx, an oesophagus and a posterior intestine with two lateral branches provided with numerous secondary branches. Each adult contains male and female reproductive organs. The reproductive organs include an anterior genital atrium, armed with numerous very spines, a medio-dorsal vagina, a single ovary and a number of testes which are posterior to the ovary.

== Hosts and localities ==
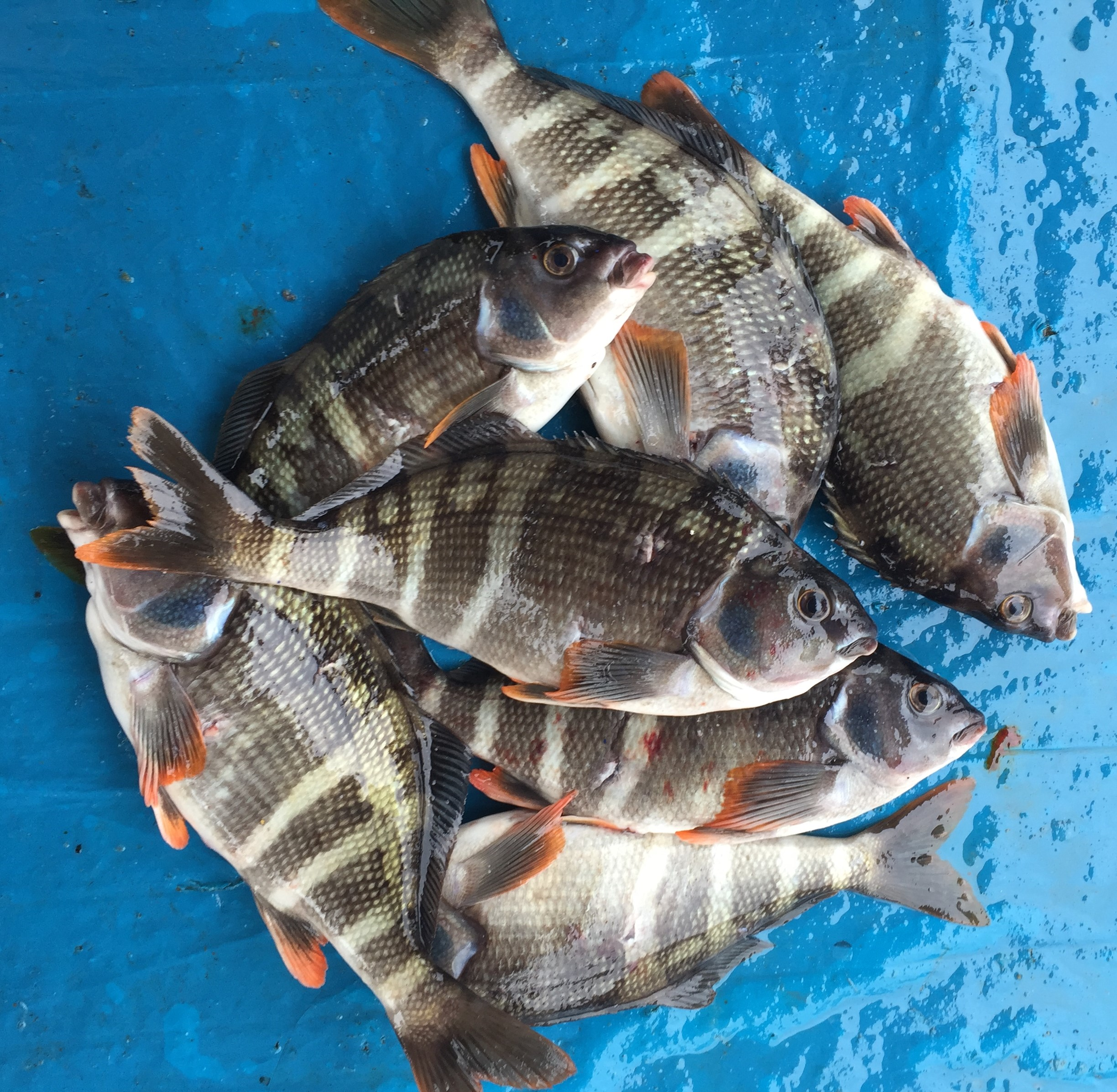
The Peruvian morwong Cheilodactylus variegatus (Cheilodactylidae) is the type-host of Microcotyle danielcarrioni

The host-type is the bandfish the Peruvian morwong Cheilodactylus variegatus (Cheilodactylidae). The type locality is off Peru. Microcotyle danielcarrioni was reported again from Cheilodactylus variegatus, off the type locality, and off Chile.
