= Microcotyle inglisi =

Scientific classification
- Kingdom: Animalia
- Phylum: Platyhelminthes
- Class: Monogenea
- Order: Mazocraeidea
- Family: Microcotylidae
- Genus: Microcotyle
- Species: M. inglisi

Binomial name
- Microcotyle inglisi Gupta & Krishna, 1980

Species of worms

Microcotyle inglisi is a species of monogenean, parasitic on the gills of a marine fish. It belongs to the family Microcotylidae. It was first described and illustrated based on 5 specimens from the gills of the Indian mackerel Scomber microlepidotus (Scombridae) off Odisha, India. (The fish host is currently named Rastrelliger kanagurta).

== Description ==
Microcotyle inglisi has the general morphology of all species of Microcotyle, with an elongate symmetrical body, tapering anteriorly and posteriorly and comprising an anterior part which contains most organs and a posterior part called the haptor. The haptor is subsymmetrical not divided into separate frills, and bears numerous clamps, arranged as two rows, one on each side (56-78 clamps on one side and 79–93 on the other side). The clamps of the haptor attach the animal to the gill of the fish. There are also two spherical buccal suckers at the anterior extremity. The digestive organs include an anterior, terminal mouth, an ovoid pharynx, an oesophagus and a posterior intestine with inner and outer diverticula extending up to level of testes, not confluent posterioriely. Each adult contains male and female reproductive organs. The reproductive organs include an anterior postbifurcal genital atrium, armed with numerous very spines, a medio-dorsal vagina, a single convoluted ovary with its distal end directed anteriorly and numerous follicular testes which are posterior to the ovary. The Egg is oval and filamented at each pole.

== Etymology ==
Microcotyle inglisi was named in honour of Dr. W. G. Inglis, Director, Environment and Conservation 5, Grenfeli Street, Adelaide, South Australia.

== Hosts and localities ==
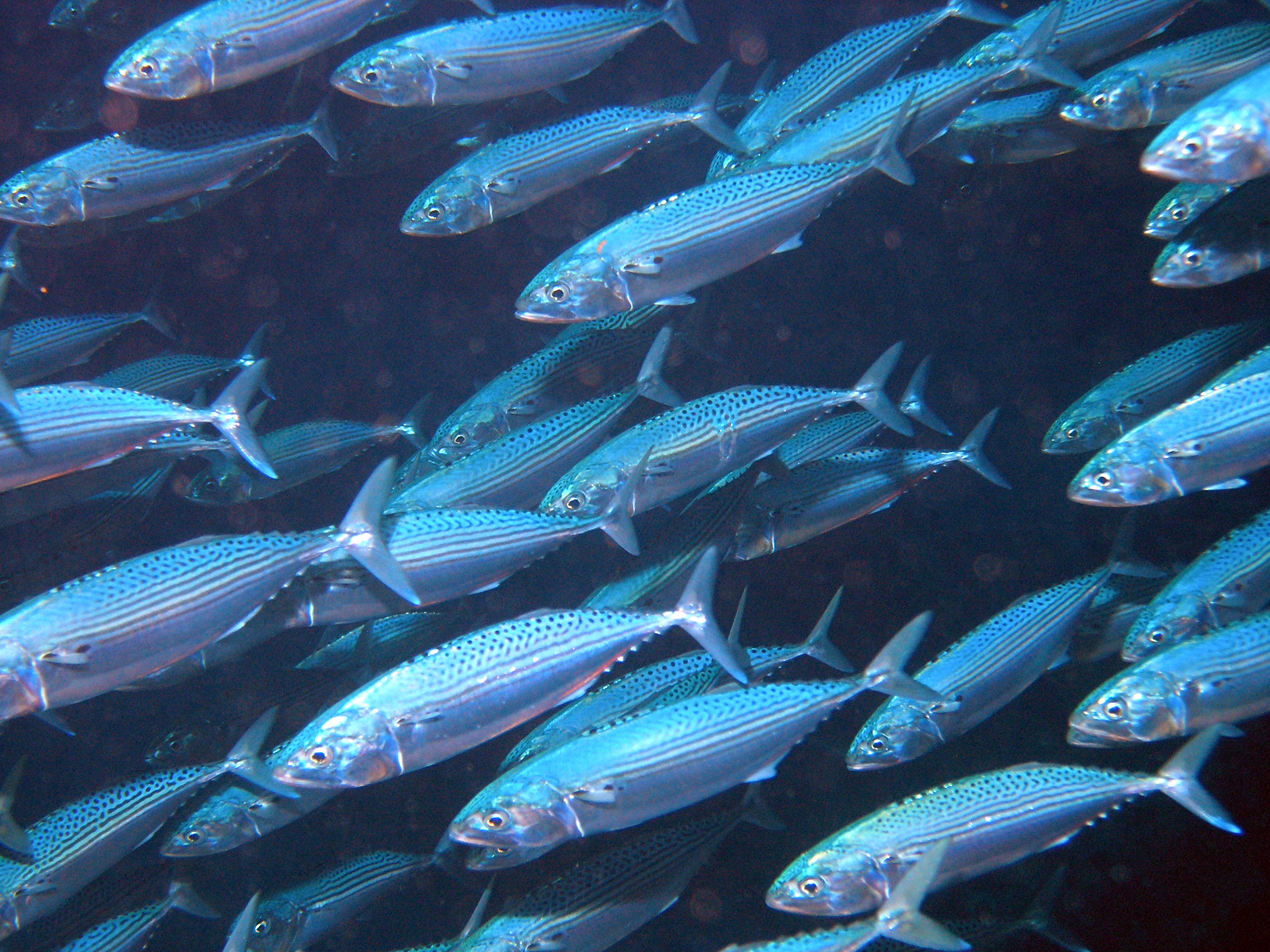
The Indian mackerel Rastrelliger kanagurta is the type-host of Microcotyle inglisi

The type-host of Microcotyle inglisi is the Indian mackerel Rastrelliger kanagurta (Scombridae). The type-locality is off India.
