= Microcotyle neozealanica =

Scientific classification
- Kingdom: Animalia
- Phylum: Platyhelminthes
- Class: Monogenea
- Order: Mazocraeidea
- Family: Microcotylidae
- Genus: Microcotyle
- Species: M. neozealanica

Binomial name
- Microcotyle neozealanica Dillon & Hargis, 1965

Synonyms
- Microcotyle neozealanicus Dillon & Hargis, 1965; Paramicrocotyle neozealanicus (Dillon & Hargis, 1965) Caballero & Bravo-Hollis, 1972

Species of worms

Microcotyle neozealanica is a species of monogenean, parasitic on the gills of a marine fish. It belongs to the family Microcotylidae.

== Taxonomy ==
Microcotyle neozealanica was first described by Dillon & Hargis in 1965 as Microcotyle neozealanicus. Caballero y Caballero and Bravo-Hollis erected the genus Paramicrocotyle to describe Paramicrocotyle tampicensis and Paramicrocotyle atriobursata off Mexico, and placed within this genus 16 species previously assigned to the genus Microcotyle including Microcotyle neozealanica. However, Microcotyle neozealanica was returned to the genus Microcotyle and Paramicrocotyle is considered a junior subjective synonym of Microcotyle. Microcotyle neozealanica was redescribed by Dillon et al., in 1985 from a single specimen from the gills of Chloropthalmus nigripinnis. The authors stated that additional specimens from this host were needed to verify this record. According to the World Register of Marine Species neozealanicus is a malformed suffix. The current accepted name is Microcotyle neozealanica.

== Morphology ==
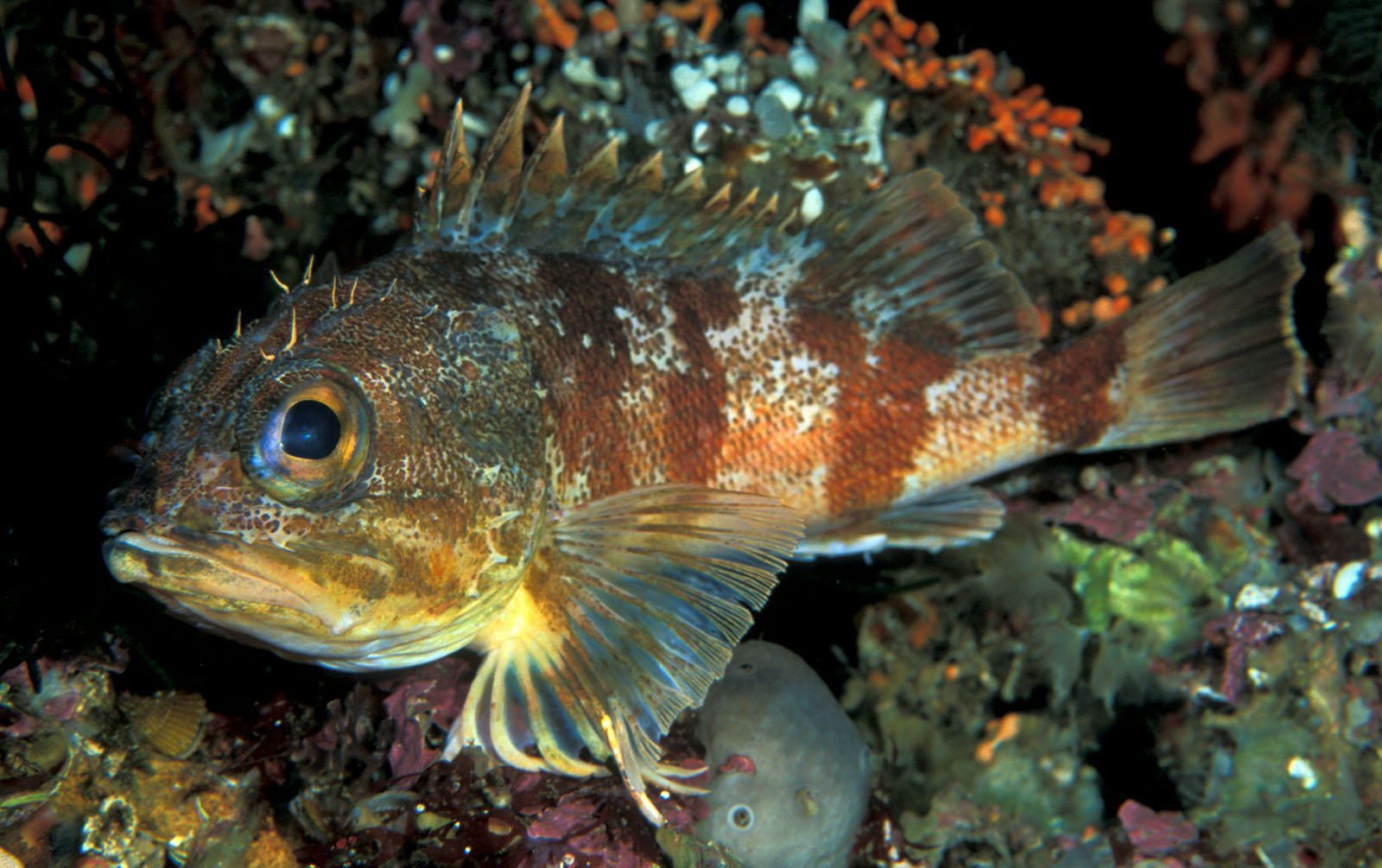
The red gurnard perch Helicolenus percoides is the type-host of Microcotyle neozealanica

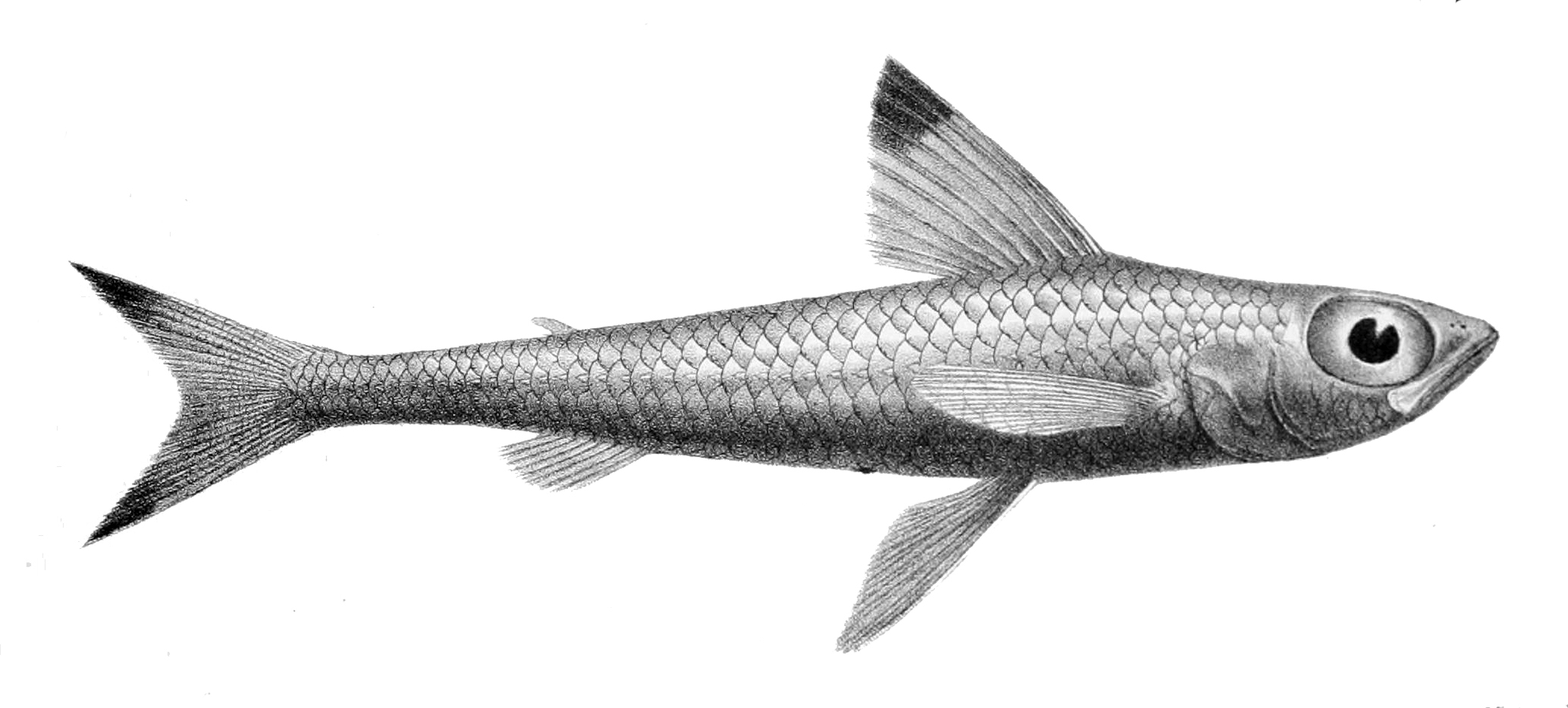
The Cucumber fish Paraulopus nigripinnis is also recorded as host of Microcotyle neozealanica

Microcotyle neozealanica has the general morphology of all species of Microcotyle, with an elongate fusiform body provided with a thin and smooth tegument, and comprising an anterior body proper which contains most organs and a posterior part called the haptor. The haptor is symmetrical, not well delineated from body proper, and bears 24–29 pairs of clamps. These clamps are similar in shape, but dissimilar in size. The clamps of the haptor attach the animal to the gill of the fish. There are also two biloculate buccal suckers placed ventrolaterally in the buccal cavity. The digestive organs include an anterior, terminal mouth, a muscular pharynx, and a posterior intestine with two lateral branches provided with medial and lateral ramifications. Each adult contains male and female reproductive organs. The reproductive organs include an anterior genital atrium armed with numerous spines, a dorsal vagina, a single tubular and folded ovary, and a number of follicular testes which are postovarian, and 11–20 in number. The fusiform egg has filaments at both ends.

== Etymology ==
The specific epithet neozealanica refers to New Zealand, the type-locality of this species.

== Hosts and localities ==
The type-host of Microcotyle neozealanica is the red gurnard perch Helicolenus percoides (Sebastidae). The type-locality is New Zealand. It was also recorded from Chlorophthalmus nigripinnis (currently named Paraulopus nigripinnis) (Chlorophthalmidae) off Australia.
