= Microcotyle rubrum =

Scientific classification
- Kingdom: Animalia
- Phylum: Platyhelminthes
- Class: Monogenea
- Order: Mazocraeidea
- Family: Microcotylidae
- Genus: Microcotyle
- Species: M. rubrum

Binomial name
- Microcotyle rubrum Hadi & Bilqees, 2010

Species of worms

Microcotyle rubrum is a species of monogenean, parasitic on the gills of a marine fish. It belongs to the family Microcotylidae. It was described from the gills of the tigertooth croaker Otolithes ruber (Sciaenidae) from Karachi coast off Pakistan.

== Description ==
Microcotyle rubrum has the general morphology of all species of Microcotyle, with a symmetrical lanceolate body, comprising an anterior part which contains most organs and a posterior part called the haptor. The haptor is symmetrical, bears clamps, arranged as two rows, one on each side (40-49 clamps on each side). The clamps of the haptor attach the animal to the gill of the fish. There are also two oval buccal suckers at the anterior extremity. The digestive organs include an anterior, terminal mouth, an oval to elongated pharynx, an oesophagus and a posterior intestine with two lateral branches provided with numerous secondary branches; both branches do not extend into the haptor. Each adult contains male and female reproductive organs. The reproductive organs include an anterior tubular and fork-like genital atrium, armed with numerous spines, a medio-dorsal vagina, a single long and tubular ovary and 56 testes which are posterior to the ovary and scattered in middle region.

== Etymology ==
The species name is derived from the specific name of the type-host Otolithes ruber.

== Hosts and localities ==
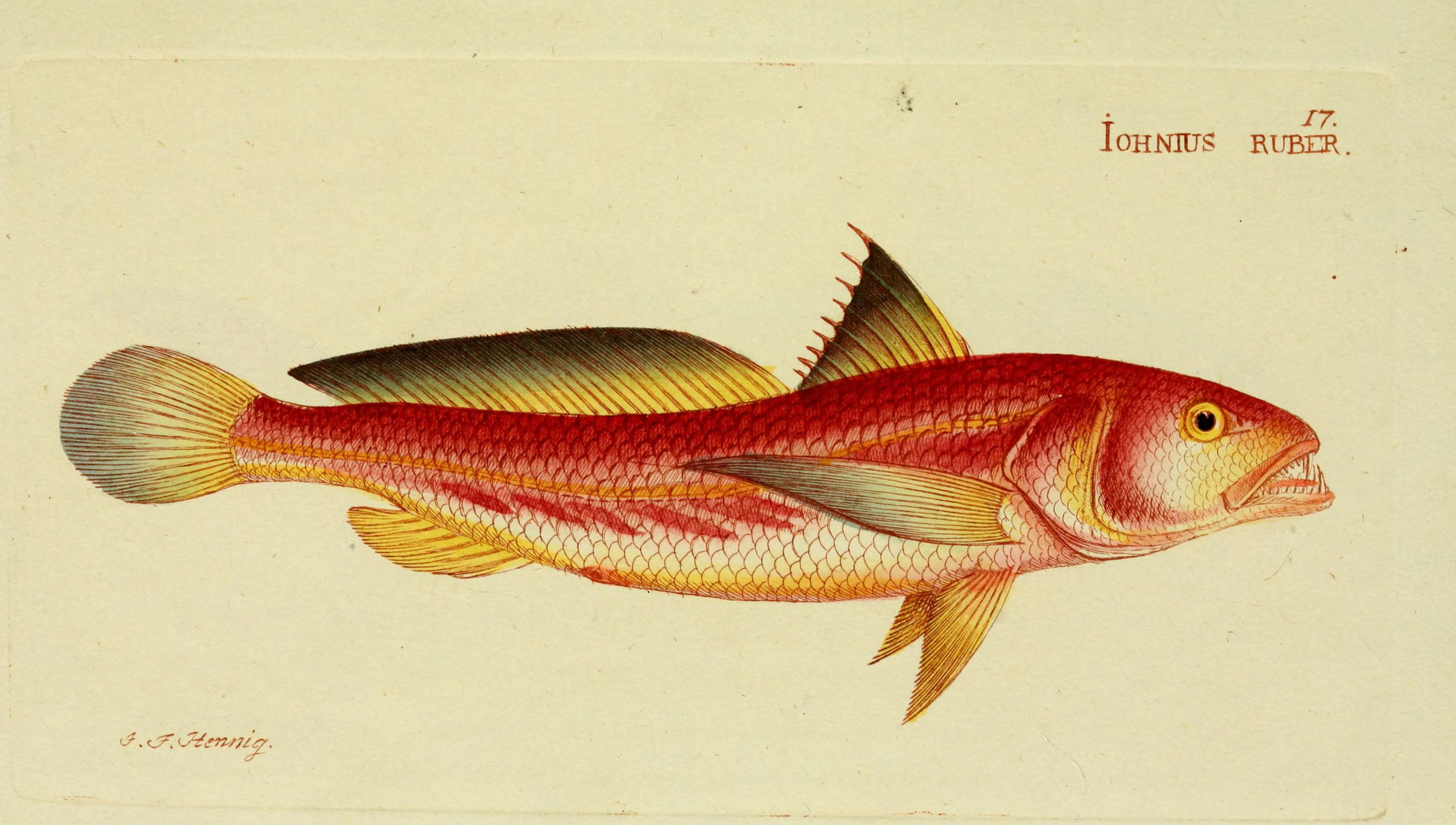
The tigertooth croaker Otolithes ruber is the type-host of Microcotyle rubrum

The tigertooth croaker Otolithes ruber (Sciaenidae) is the type-host and only recorded host. The type-locality and only recorded locality is Karachi Coast off Pakistan.
