= Microcotyle otrynteri =

Scientific classification
- Kingdom: Animalia
- Phylum: Platyhelminthes
- Class: Monogenea
- Order: Mazocraeidea
- Family: Microcotylidae
- Genus: Microcotyle
- Species: M. otrynteri

Binomial name
- Microcotyle otrynteri Pearse, 1949

Species of worm

Microcotyle otrynteri is a species of monogenean, parasitic on the gills of a marine fish. It belongs to the family Microcotylidae.

== Systematics ==
Microcotyle otrynteri was first described by Pearse in 1949 based on 4 specimens taken from one host. According to Hendrix (1994), the species is poorly described and needs further investigation.

== Morphology ==
Microcotyle otrynteri has the general morphology of all species of Microcotyle, with a slender body, widest in the middle and tapering toward each end, with an expanded anterior end. The body comprises an anterior part which contains most organs and a posterior part called the haptor. The haptor bears 40 clamps, arranged as two closely set rows, one on each side. The clamps of the haptor attach the animal to the gill of the fish. There are also two buccal suckers anterior to the pharynx at the anterior extremity. The digestive organs include an anterior, terminal mouth, a pharynx, and a posterior intestine with two lateral branches. Each adult contains male and female reproductive organs. The reproductive organs include an genital atrium, armed with numerous conical spines, a single ovary, vitellarium glands and testes which are posterior to the ovary.

== Etymology ==
The specific name otrynteri is derived from the generic name of the host species Otrynter caprinus.

== Diagnosis ==
According to Pearse (1949), Microcotyle otrynteri can be differentiated from other species of the genus Microcotyle studies by him in the same paper, by the dorsal papilla over the mouth, and the number and character of the haptoral clamps.

== Hosts, localities ==
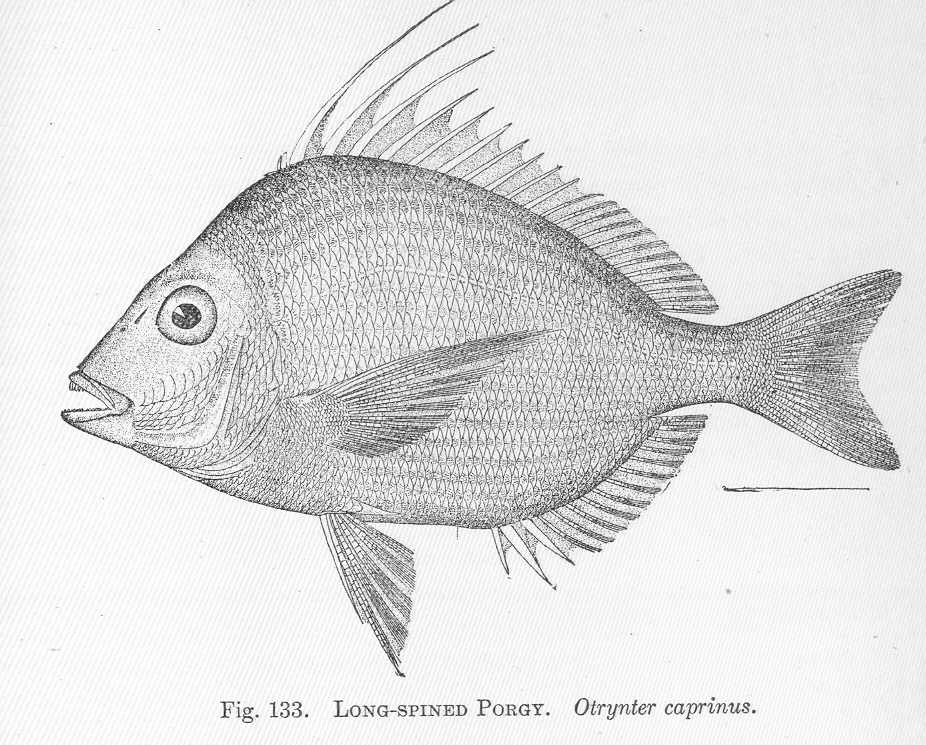
The type-host of Microcotyle peprili is Otrynter caprinus

The type-host and only recorded host of Microcotyle otrynteri is Stenotomus caprinus, originally called Otrynter caprinus (Sparidae ). The type locality and only locality is off North Carolina.
