= Microcotyle cepolae =

Scientific classification
- Kingdom: Animalia
- Phylum: Platyhelminthes
- Class: Monogenea
- Order: Mazocraeidea
- Family: Microcotylidae
- Genus: Microcotyle
- Species: M. cepolae

Binomial name
- Microcotyle cepolae Yamaguti, 1938

Synonyms
- Paramicrocotyle cepolae (Yamaguti, 1938) Caballero & Bravo-Hollis, 1972

Species of worms

Microcotyle cepolae is a species of monogenean, parasitic on the gills of a marine fish. It belongs to the family Microcotylidae.

== Systematics ==
Microcotyle cepolae was first described by Yamaguti in 1938. In 1972, Caballero y Caballero and Bravo-Hollis erected the genus Paramicrocotyle to describe Paramicrocotyle tampicensis and Paramicrocotyle atriobursata off Mexico, and placed within this genus sixteen species previously assigned to the genus Microcotyle including M. cepolae. However, this species was returned to the genus Microcotyle by Mamaev in 1986.

== Hosts and localities ==
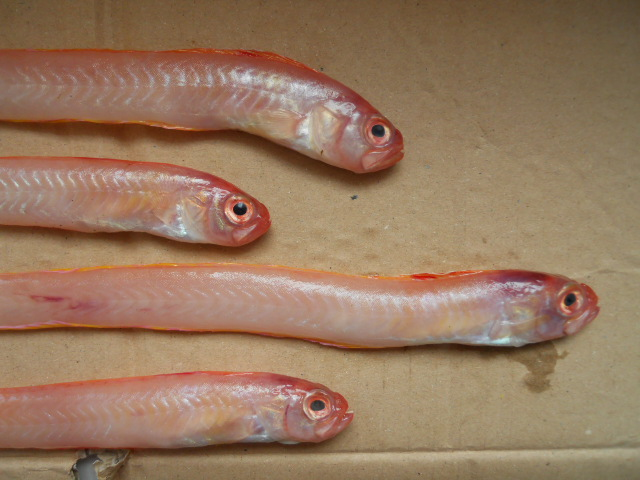
A species of bandfish similar to the one which is the host of Microcotyle cepolae

The host-type is the bandfish Cepola schlegelii (Cepolidae). The type-locality is off Japan. Microcotyle cepolae was reported again from the type-host and locality.
