= Microcotyle pseudopercis =

Scientific classification
- Kingdom: Animalia
- Phylum: Platyhelminthes
- Class: Monogenea
- Order: Mazocraeidea
- Family: Microcotylidae
- Genus: Microcotyle
- Species: M. pseudopercis

Binomial name
- Microcotyle pseudopercis Amato & Cezar, 1994

Species of worms

Microcotyle pseudopercis is a species of monogenean, parasitic on the gills of a marine fish. It belongs to the family Microcotylidae.

It was first described from the gills of the namorado sandperch Pseudopercis numida and the Argentinian sandperch Pseudopercis semifasciata (Pinguipedidae) off Brazil.

== Description ==
Microcotyle pseudopercis has the general morphology of all species of Microcotyle, with a symmetrical body, comprising an anterior part which contains most organs and a posterior part called the haptor. The haptor is symmetrical, and bears clamps, arranged as two rows, one on each side. The clamps of the haptor attach the animal to the gill of the fish. There are also two buccal suckers at the anterior extremity. The digestive organs include an anterior, terminal mouth, a pharynx, an oesophagus and a posterior intestine with two lateral branches provided with numerous secondary branches. Each adult contains male and female reproductive organs. The reproductive organs include an anterior genital atrium, armed with numerous very spines, a medio-dorsal vagina, a single ovary and a number of testes which are posterior to the ovary.

== Etymology ==
The species name is derived from the generic name of the hosts, Pseudopercis.

== Hosts and localities ==
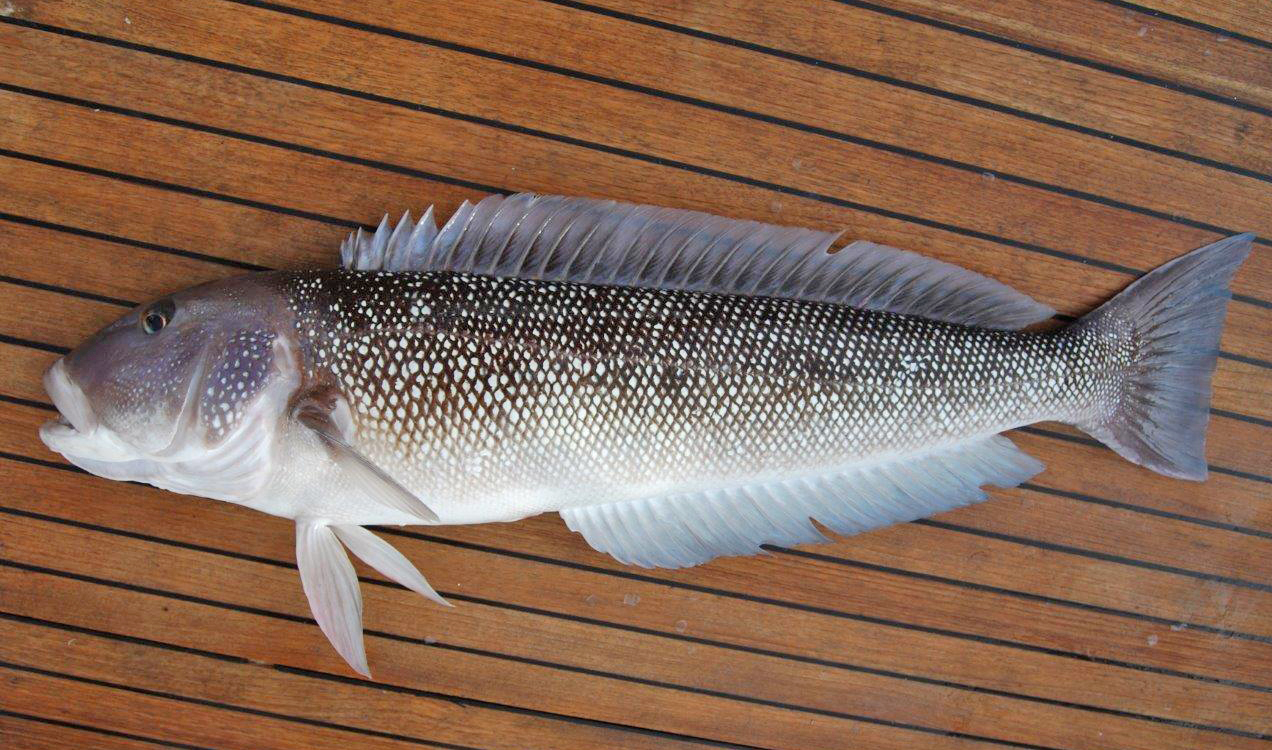
Pseudopercis numida is the host of Microcotyle pseudopercis

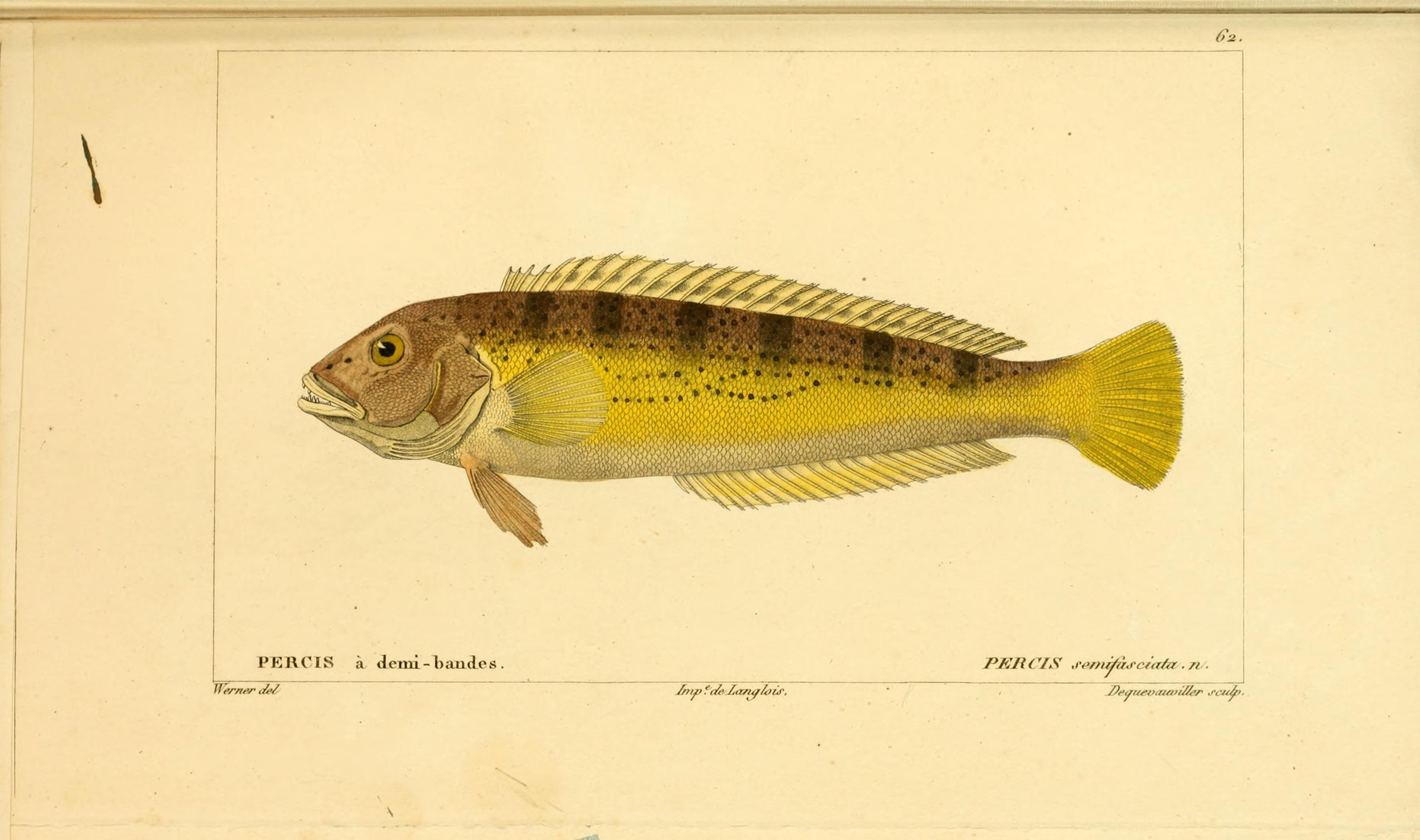
Pseudopercis semifasciata is also host of Microcotyle pseudopercis

Hosts of Microcotyle pseudopercis reported in the original description are the namorado Sandperch Pseudopercis numida and the Argentinian sandperch Pseudopercis semifasciata (Pinguipedidae). The type locality is off Brazil.
