= Microcotyle branchiostegi =

Scientific classification
- Kingdom: Animalia
- Phylum: Platyhelminthes
- Class: Monogenea
- Order: Mazocraeidea
- Family: Microcotylidae
- Genus: Microcotyle
- Species: M. branchiostegi

Binomial name
- Microcotyle branchiostegi Yamaguti, 1937

Synonyms
- Caenomicrocotyle (Caenomicrocotyle) branchiostegi (Yamaguti, 1937) Unnithan1971

Species of worms

Microcotyle branchiostegi is a species of monogenean, parasitic on the gills of a marine fish. It belongs to the family Microcotylidae.

== Taxonomy ==
Microcotyle branchiostegi was first described by Yamaguti in 1937 from the gills of the horsehead tilefish Branchiostegus japonicus off Japan. Unnithan (1971) placed this species in the new genus and subgenus Caenomicrocotyle as Caenomicrocotyle (Caenomicrocotyle) branchiostegi. However, this genus and this subgenus were returned into the genus Microcotyle by Mamaev.

== Hosts and localities ==
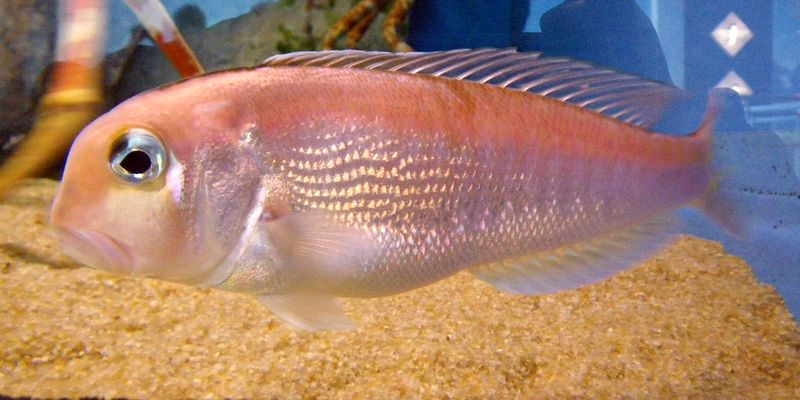
The horsehead tilefish Branchiostegus japonicus is the type host of Microcotyle branchiostegi

The type-host is the horsehead tilefish Branchiostegus japonicus (Malacanthidae). The type-locality is off Japan.
