= Microcotyle tampicensis =

Scientific classification
- Kingdom: Animalia
- Phylum: Platyhelminthes
- Class: Monogenea
- Order: Mazocraeidea
- Family: Microcotylidae
- Genus: Microcotyle
- Species: M. tampicensis

Binomial name
- Microcotyle tampicensis (Caballero & Bravo-Hollis, 1972) Mamaev, 1986

Synonyms
- Paramicrocotyle tampicensis Caballero & Bravo-Hollis, 1972

Species of worm

Microcotyle tampicensis is a species of monogenean, parasitic on the gills of a marine fish. It belongs to the family Microcotylidae.

== Systematics ==
In 1972, Caballero y Caballero and Bravo-Hollis erected the genus Paramicrocotyle to describe Paramicrocotyle tampicensis and Paramicrocotyle atriobursata off Mexico, they placed within this genus 16 species previously assigned to the genus Microcotyle. In their paper, Caballero y Caballero and Bravo-Hollis described Microcotyle tampicensis based on a single mature specimen. Mamaev, in his revision of the family Microcotylidae, transferred the species to the genus Microcotyle as Microcotyle tampicensis and considered Paramicrocotyle a junior subjective synonym of Microcotyle. Currently, Paramicrocotyle tampicensis is a superseded combination.

Mendoza-Franco et al., examined five vouchers of Microcotyle tampicensis and noted a striking similarity between this species and Microcotyle archosargi, especially in regard to the morphologically comparable genital atrium. The authors explained this similarity by the differentiation of Microcotyle archosargi based mainly on the organisation and shape of the genital atrium. The authors considered the two species distinct based on the length of the genital atrium. As the examined vouchers were flattened and/or distorted, Mendoza-Franco et al. emphasized the need of examination of specimens of Microcotyle tampicensis from the type-host and type locality to determine a possible synonymy with Microcotyle archosargi.

== Morphology ==
Microcotyle tampicensis has the general morphology of all species of Microcotyle, with an elongated body, a rounded anterior end and a smooth cuticle, comprising an anterior part which contains most organs and a posterior part called the haptor. The haptor is asymmetrical and bears numerous clamps, arranged as two rows, one on each side (48 clamps on the left side and 50 on the right). The clamps of the haptor attach the animal to the gill of the fish. There are also two pyriform septate buccal suckers at the anterior extremity. The digestive organs include an anterior, terminal mouth, an ovoid muscular pharynx, and a posterior intestine with two branches provided with small lateral diverticula and penetrate the haptor freely to its terminal end. Each adult contains male and female reproductive organs. The reproductive organs include an anterior genital atrium, with spines arranged in concentric circles, a dorsal vagina opening in front of the egg at the beginning of the seminal vesicle, a single ovary in form of a question mark, 13 ovoid or slightly spherical testes which are posterior to the ovary.

== Etymology ==
The specific epithet tampicensis is derived from Tampico, a city and port in Mexico.

== Hosts and localities ==
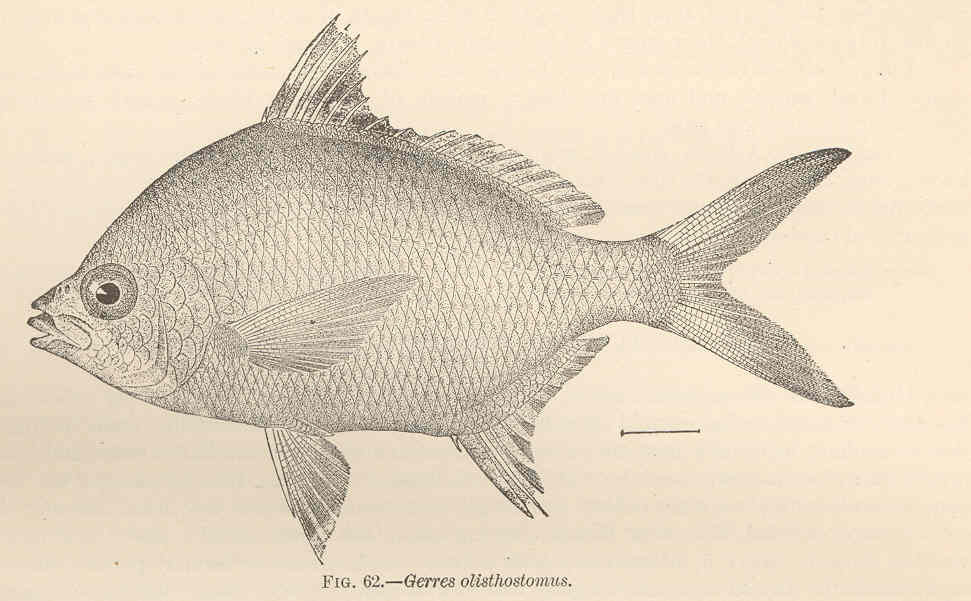
The type-host of Microcotyle tampicensis is the Irish mojarra Diapterus auratus

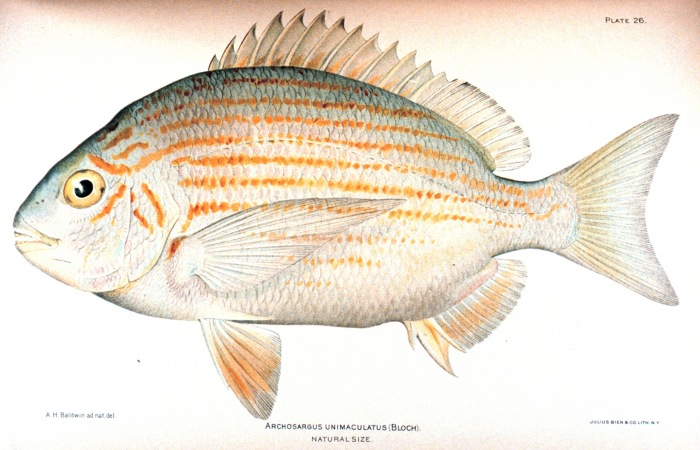
The Western Atlantic seabream Archosargus rhomboidalis is also recorded as host of Microcotyle tampicensis

The type-host of Microcotyle tampicensis is the Irish mojarra Diapterus olisthostomus (currently Diapterus auratus) (Gerreidae). It was also recorded on the Western Atlantic seabream Archosargus rhomboidalis (Sparidaede) by Lamothe-Argumedo et al., in 1996. The type-locality is off Mexico.
