= Jaliscia =

Scientific classification
- Kingdom: Animalia
- Phylum: Platyhelminthes
- Class: Monogenea
- Order: Mazocraeidea
- Family: Microcotylidae
- Subfamily: Microcotylinae
- Genus: Jaliscia; Mamaev & Egorova, 1977
- Species: J. caballeroi

Binomial name
- Jaliscia caballeroi (Bravo-Hollis, 1960) Mamaev & Egorova, 1977

Genus of flatworms

Jaliscia is a genus which belongs to the family Microcotylidae and class Monogenea. As all Monogenea, species of Jaliscia are ectoparasites that affect their host by attaching themselves as larvae on the gills of the fish and grow into adult stage. This larval stage is called oncomiracidium, and is characterized as free swimming and ciliated.

Members of the genus Jaliscia are characterised by an armed genital atrium, an unarmed cirrus and a single unarmed vagina.

== Species ==
According to the World Register of Marine Species, this genus includes one species:

- Jaliscia caballeroi (Bravo-Hollis, 1960) Mamaev & Egorova, 1977
