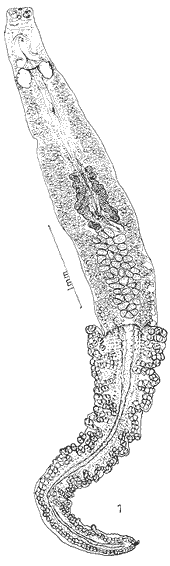
- Anchoromicrocotyle guaymensis (Type-species of Anchoromicrocotyle )

Scientific classification
- Kingdom: Animalia
- Phylum: Platyhelminthes
- Class: Monogenea
- Order: Mazocraeidea
- Family: Microcotylidae
- Subfamily: Anchoromicrocotylinae
- Genus: Anchoromicrocotyle; Bravo-Hollis, 1981

= Anchoromicrocotyle =

Genus of flatworms

Anchoromicrocotyle is a genus which belongs to the family Microcotylidae and class Monogenea. Species of Anchoromicrocotyle are ectoparasites that affect their host by attaching themselves as larvae on the gills of the fish and grow into adult stage. This larval stage is called oncomiracidium, and is characterized as free swimming and ciliated. As all Anchoromicrocotylinae, members of Anchoromicrocotyle are characterized by a larval organ and larval hooks and the structure of their genital complex. This genus was created by Bravo-Hollis in 1981, to accommodate Monogeneans recovered from the gills of Atractoscion nobilis (Sciaenidae) (synonym of Cynoscion nobilis ) caught off California. In the same work, Bravo-Hollis in 1981 created a new subfamily Anchoromicrocotylinae and emended the diagnosis of the family Microcotylidae.

== Morphology and hosts ==
Members of Anchoromicrocotyle have an elongated body with the a symmetrical haptor armed with three pairs of larval hooks. The digestif system includes two oral suckers with papillary edges, a pharynx and an esophagus present. The male genital system includes numerous postovarian testicles, a vas deferens and a complex copulatory organ composed of: a penis-like copulatory organ, a male atrium and two prostate bags. The female genital system comprises a complex ovary, a genito-intestinal canal, an ootype, a uterus and a medio-dorsal unarmed vagina. Species of Anchoromicrocotyle are parasites of marine fish of the family Sciaenidae.

== Species ==
According to the World Register of Marine Species, this genus includes one species:

- Anchoromicrocotyle guaymensis Bravo-Hollis, 1981
