= Prosomicrocotyla =

Scientific classification
- Kingdom: Animalia
- Phylum: Platyhelminthes
- Class: Monogenea
- Order: Mazocraeidea
- Family: Microcotylidae
- Subfamily: Prosomicrocotylinae
- Genus: Prosomicrocotyla; Yamaguti, 1958

Genus of flatworms

Prosomicrocotyla is a genus of monogenean. Species of Prosomicrocotyla are ectoparasites that affect their host by attaching themselves as larvae on the gills of the fish and grow into adult stage. This larval stage is called oncomiracidium, and is characterized as free swimming and ciliated. Members of Prosomicrocotyla are characterised by a spatulate body; an haptor divided into two separate frills bordering posterior half of body proper, commencing at level of ovary; a non differentiated cirrus; a genital atrium forming a sucker-like structure armed with spines and a single middorsal vagina.

== Species ==
Currently 4 species are recognized:

- Prosomicrocotyla bergi Mamaev, 1987
- Prosomicrocotyla chiri (Goto, 1894) Yamaguti, 1958
- Prosomicrocotyla gotoi (Yamaguti, 1934) Yamaguti, 1958
- Prosomicrocotyla paraliparis Mamaev, 1987
