= Syncoelicotyloides =

Scientific classification
- Kingdom: Animalia
- Phylum: Platyhelminthes
- Class: Monogenea
- Order: Mazocraeidea
- Family: Microcotylidae
- Subfamily: Syncoelicotylinae
- Genus: Syncoelicotyloides; Mamaev & Zubchenko, 1978

Genus of flatworms

Syncoelicotyloides is a genus of monogenean. Species of Syncoelicotyloides are ectoparasites that affect their host by attaching themselves as larvae on the gills of the fish and grow into adult stage. This larval stage is called oncomiracidium, and is characterized as free swimming and ciliated.

== Description ==
Members of Syncoelicotyloides are characterised by a broad leaf-shaped body, a muscular copulative organ armed with numerous hook-shaped spines and two dorsolateral vaginae with large slit-like openings.

== Species ==
Currently two species are recognized:

- Syncoelicotyloides macruri Mamaev & Brashovian, 1989
- Syncoelicotyloides zaniophori Rubec, Blend & Dronen, 1995
