= Gamacallum =

Scientific classification
- Kingdom: Animalia
- Phylum: Platyhelminthes
- Class: Monogenea
- Order: Mazocraeidea
- Family: Microcotylidae
- Subfamily: Microcotylinae
- Genus: Gamacallum; Unnithan, 1971
- Species: G. macroura

Binomial name
- Gamacallum macroura (MacCallum & MacCallum, 1913) Unnithan, 1971

Genus of flatworms

Gamacallum is a genus which belongs to the family Microcotylidae and class Monogenea. As all Monogenea, species of Gamacallum are ectoparasites that affect their host by attaching themselves as larvae on the gills of the fish and grow into adult stage. This larval stage is called oncomiracidium, and is characterized as free swimming and ciliated.

Members of the genus Gamacallum are characterised by a short wide haptor with up to 25 pairs of clamps, an unarmed genital atrium and a penis occasionally armed with four spines, and a single unarmed vaginal pore.

== Species ==
According to the World Register of Marine Species, this genus includes one species:

- Gamacallum macroura (MacCallum & MacCallum, 1913) Unnithan, 1971 previously included in Microcotyle as Microcotyle macroura MacCallum & MacCallum, 1913
