= Caballeraxine =

Scientific classification
- Kingdom: Animalia
- Phylum: Platyhelminthes
- Class: Monogenea
- Order: Mazocraeidea
- Family: Microcotylidae
- Subfamily: Microcotylinae
- Genus: Caballeraxine; Lebedev, 1972
- Species: C. chainanica

Binomial name
- Caballeraxine chainanica (Lebedev, Parukhin & Roitman, 1970) Lebedev, 1972

Genus of flatworms

Caballeraxine is a genus which belongs to the family Microcotylidae and class Monogenea. As all Monogenea, species of Caballeraxine are ectoparasites that affect their host by attaching themselves as larvae on the gills of the fish and grow into adult stage. This larval stage is called oncomiracidium, and is characterized as free swimming and ciliated.

Members of the genus Caballeraxine are characterised by a single, unarmed vagina.

== Species ==
According to the World Register of Marine Species, this genus includes one species:

- Caballeraxine chainanica (Lebedev, Parukhin & Roitman, 1970) Lebedev, 1972 previously included in Axinella as Axinella chainanica Lebedev, Parukhin & Roitman, 1970
