= Diplostamenides =

Scientific classification
- Kingdom: Animalia
- Phylum: Platyhelminthes
- Class: Monogenea
- Order: Mazocraeidea
- Family: Microcotylidae
- Subfamily: Microcotylinae
- Genus: Diplostamenides; Unnithan, 1971

Genus of flatworms

Diplostamenides is a genus which belongs to the family Microcotylidae and class Monogenea. As all Monogenea, species of Atriostella are ectoparasites that affect their host by attaching themselves as larvae on the gills of the fish and grow into adult stage. This larval stage is called oncomiracidium, and is characterized as free swimming and ciliated.

Members of the genus Diplostamenides are characterised by a genital atrium armed with a corona of graded spines and relatively few, usually much stouter spines on head of the penis.

== Species ==
According to the World Register of Marine Species, 8 species have been attached to this genus:

- Diplostamenides priacanthi (Meserve, 1938) Unnithan, 1971
- Diplostamenides sciaenae (Goto, 1894) Mamaev, 1986
- Diplostamenides canthari (Van Beneden & Hesse, 1863) Unnithan, 1971 included in Neobivagina as Neobivagina canthari (Van Beneden & Hesse, 1863) Dillon & Hargls, 1965
- Diplostamenides madrasi (Tripathi, 1959) Unnithan, 1971 included in Diplostamenides as Diplostamenides sciaenae (Goto, 1894) Mamaev, 1986
- Diplostamenides pancerii (Sonsino, 1891) Unnithan, 1971 included in Sciaenacotyle as Sciaenacotyle pancerii (Sonsino, 1891) Mamaev, 1989
- Diplostamenides salpae (Parona & Perugia, 1890) Unnithan, 1971 included in Atrispinum as Atrispinum salpae (Parona & Perugia, 1890)
- Diplostamenides sargi (Parona & Perugia, 1890) Unnithan, 1971 included in Atrispinum as Atrispinum sargi (Parona & Perugia, 1890) Euzet & Maillard, 1974
- Diplostamenides umbrinae Unnithan, 1971 included in Diplostamenides as Diplostamenides sciaenae (Goto, 1894) Mamaev, 1986
