= Atriostella =

Scientific classification
- Kingdom: Animalia
- Phylum: Platyhelminthes
- Class: Monogenea
- Order: Mazocraeidea
- Family: Microcotylidae
- Subfamily: Microcotylinae
- Genus: Atriostella; Unnithan, 1971

Genus of flatworms

Atriostella is a genus which belongs to the family Microcotylidae and class Monogenea. As all Monogenea, species of Atriostella are ectoparasites that affect their host by attaching themselves as larvae on the gills of the fish and grow into adult stage. This larval stage is called oncomiracidium, and is characterized as free swimming and ciliated.

This genus was proposed by Unnithan in 1971 who included in this genus two subgenera: the subgenus Atriostella with a single middorsal unarmed vaginal pore; and the subgenus Biplacunella with a ventral cuticular post-atrial body plaque and a much wider dorsal plaque behind the two unarmed vulvae.

Members of the genus Atriostella are characterised by a generally symmetrical haptor, a genital atrium armed with erect long spines of and a muscular penis lobed or not and entirely unarmed.

== Species ==
According to the World Register of Marine Species, 2 species have been attached to this genus:

- Atriostella otolithus Unnithan, 1971
- Atriostella sciaenae (Goto, 1894) Unnithan, 1971 currently included in Diplostamenides as Diplostamenides sciaenae (Goto, 1894) Mamaev, 1986
