= Diplasiocotyle =

Scientific classification
- Kingdom: Animalia
- Phylum: Platyhelminthes
- Class: Monogenea
- Order: Mazocraeidea
- Family: Microcotylidae
- Subfamily: Microcotylinae
- Genus: Diplasiocotyle; Sandars, 1944

Type species
- Diplasiocotyle johnstoni Sandars, 1944

Genus of flatworms

Diplasiocotyle is a genus which belongs to the family Microcotylidae and class Monogenea. As all Monogenea, species of Microcotylidae are ectoparasites that affect their host by attaching themselves as larvae on the gills of the fish and grow into adult stage. This larval stage is called oncomiracidium, and is characterized as free swimming and ciliated.

Members of the genus Diplasiocotyle are characterised by a conspicuous haptor, a midventral genital atrium armed with small hooks. This genus differs from Microcotyle by having clamps of two widely different sizes (the majority are extremely large) and by the structure of clamps.

== Species ==
According to the World Register of Marine Species, 4 species have been attached to this genus:

- Diplasiocotyle agonostomi (Sandars, 1945) Mamaev, 1968
- Diplasiocotyle johnstoni Sandars, 1944
- Diplasiocotyle cantheri (Van Beneden & Hesse, 1863) Yamaguti, 1963 included in Diplostamenides as Diplostamenides canthari (Van Beneden & Hesse, 1863) Unnithan, 1971 then in Neobivagina as Neobivagina canthari (Van Beneden & Hesse, 1863) Dillon & Hargls, 1965
- Diplasiocotyle chorinemi Tripathi, 1956 included in Heterapta as Heterapta chorinemi (Tripathi, 1956) Unnithan, 1961
