= Polynemicola =

Scientific classification
- Kingdom: Animalia
- Phylum: Platyhelminthes
- Class: Monogenea
- Order: Mazocraeidea
- Family: Microcotylidae
- Subfamily: Microcotylinae
- Genus: Polynemicola; Unnithan, 1971

Genus of flatworms

Polynemicola is a genus of monegenean. As all Monogenea, species of Polynemicola are ectoparasites that affect their host by attaching themselves as larvae on the gills of the fish and grow into adult stage. This larval stage is called oncomiracidium, and is characterized as free swimming and ciliated.

== Description ==
Members of the genus Polynemicola are characterised by a haptor nearly as long as, and distinct from, body; an eversible spiny cirrus; an unarmed genital atrium usually with a muscular sphincter-like rim and receptaculum seminis often well developed near the distal end of vagina.

== Species ==
Currently 14 species are recognized:

- Polynemicola aequispinosa Mamaev, 1977
- Polynemicola ambiguus Mamaev, 1977
- Polynemicola brachypetala Zhang, Yang & Xiao in Zhang, Yang & Liu, 2001
- Polynemicola bulbovaginatus Unnithan, 1971
- Polynemicola californicus Bravo-Hollis, 1986
- Polynemicola heterocotyle Mamev, 1977
- Polynemicola indicus Hadi, Mehwish, Tooba, Khalil & Ibrahim, 2019
- Polynemicola polynemi (MacCallum, 1917) Unnithan, 1971
- Polynemicola sciaenae Mamaev, 1977
- Polynemicola tritestis Unnithan, 1971
- Polynemicola sextariusi Gudivada & Vankara, 2010
- Polynemicola ambigua Mamaev, 1977 accepted as Polynemicola ambiguus Mamaev, 1977
- Polynemicola californica Bravo-Hollis, 1985 accepted as Polynemicola californicus Mamaev, 1977
- Polynemicola ichimidai (Ishii & Sawada, 1938) Unnithan, 1971 included in Bivagina tai as Bivagina tai (Yamaguti, 1938) Yamaguti, 1963
