= Microcotyle centrodonti =

Scientific classification
- Kingdom: Animalia
- Phylum: Platyhelminthes
- Class: Monogenea
- Order: Mazocraeidea
- Family: Microcotylidae
- Genus: Bivagina
- Species: B. centrodonti

Binomial name
- Bivagina centrodonti Brown, 1929

Synonyms
- Dinotaster centrodonti (Brown, 1929) Unnithan1971

Species of worms

Bivagina centrodonti is a species of monogenean, parasitic on the gills of a marine fish. It belongs to the family Microcotylidae.

== Taxonomy ==
Bivagina centrodonti was first described by Brown in 1929 from the gills of dead fishes of the species Pagellus centrodontus (currently Pagellus bogaraveo found in an Aquarium of the English Channel. Unnithan (1971) placed this species in his new monotypic genus Dinotaster. However, Bivagina centrodonti was returned to the genus Bivagina by Mamaev & Parukhin in 1975.

== Morphology ==
Bivagina centrodonti has the general morphology of all species of Bivagina, with a symmetrical small thread-like body, elongated and tapering at both ends. The body comprises an anterior part which contains most organs and a posterior part called the haptor. The haptor is symmetrical, delimited from the body by a constriction, and bears 120-160 clamps, arranged as two rows, one on each side. The clamps of the haptor attach the animal to the gill of the fish. There are also two buccal suckers, elliptical and septate, located at the anterior extremity. The digestive organs include an anterior, terminal mouth, a spherical muscular pharynx, an oesophagus immediately anterior to the genital atrium and a posterior intestine with two lateral branches provided with numerous secondary branches, which enter the haptor. Each adult contains male and female reproductive organs. The reproductive organs include an anterior genital atrium situated immediately posterior to the intestinal bifurcation, armed with numerous very spines, a medio-dorsal bifurcated vagina situated posterior to the buccal suckers, a single much-coiled ovary consisting of a convoluted tube, and 14-23 testes which are posterior to the ovary and occupy the center of the posterior portion of the body. The eggs have long, fine, very coiled filament, and are elongated and pointed at both ends. The posterior filament is much shorter.

== Hosts and localities ==
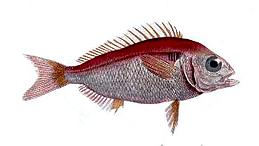
Pagellus bogaraveo is the type host of Bivagina centrodonti

The host-type is Pagellus bogaraveo (Sparidae). The type-locality is the English Channel.
