= Cynoscionicola =

Scientific classification
- Kingdom: Animalia
- Phylum: Platyhelminthes
- Class: Monogenea
- Order: Mazocraeidea
- Family: Microcotylidae
- Subfamily: Anchoromicrocotylinae
- Genus: Cynoscionicola; Price, 1962

Genus of flatworms

Cynoscionicola is a genus which belongs to the family Microcotylidae and class Monogenea. Species of Cynoscionicola are ectoparasites that affect their host by attaching themselves as larvae on the gills of the fish and grow into adult stage. This larval stage is called oncomiracidium, and is characterized as free swimming and ciliated. This genus was proposed by Price in 1962, to accommodate Cynoscionicola heteracantha and Cynoscionicola pseudoheteracantha (previously included in the genus Microcotyle). Members of Cynoscionicola are characterised by a genital atrium with two anterior muscular pockets armed with single row of hooked spines, and two posterior lateral muscular pouches armed with spines.

== Species ==
According to the World Register of Marine Species, this genus includes 14 species:

- Cynoscionicola americanus Tantaléan, Martínez & Escalante, 1987
- Cynoscionicola calcariferi Hadi, Khalil, Khan, Ibrahim & Bilqees, 2017
- Cynoscionicola cynoscioni Tantalean, Martinez & Escalante, 1987
- Cynoscionicola heteracantha (Manter, 1938) Price, 1962
- Cynoscionicola intermedius Tantalean, Martinez & Escalante, 1988
- Cynoscionicola jamaicensis Lambert & Euzet, 1979
- Cynoscionicola longicauda (Goto, 1899) Yamaguti, 1963
- Cynoscionicola powersi Payne, 1990
- Cynoscionicola pseudoheteracantha (Hargis, 1956) Price, 1962
- Cynoscionicola sciaenae Tantalean, 1974
- Cynoscionicola similis Lambert & Euzet, 1979
- Cynoscionicola srivastavai Bravo-Hollis & Caballero-Rodríguez, 1970
- Cynoscionicola veranoi Chero, Cruces, Saez & Luque, 2017
