= Solostamenides =

Scientific classification
- Kingdom: Animalia
- Phylum: Platyhelminthes
- Class: Monogenea
- Order: Mazocraeidea
- Family: Microcotylidae
- Subfamily: Microcotylinae
- Genus: Solostamenides; Unnithan, 1971

Genus of flatworms

Solostamenides is a genus which belongs to the family Microcotylidae and class Monogenea.

== Morphology ==
As all Monogenea, species of Solostamenides are ectoparasites that affect their host by attaching themselves as larvae on the gills of the fish and grow into adult stage. This larval stage is called oncomiracidium, and is characterized as free swimming and ciliated.

Members of the genus Solostamenides are characterised by a penis in which only the head is armed with spines, a muscular genital atrium and a single middorsal unarmed vaginal pore.

== Species ==
According to the World Register of Marine Species, this genus includes 5 species:

- Solostamenides mugilis (Vogt, 1879) Unnithan, 1971
- Solostamenides paucitesticulatus Kritsky & Öktener, 2015
- Solostamenides platyorchis Zhang & Yang, 2001
- Solostamenides pseudomugilis (Hargis, 1957) Unnithan, 1971

• Solostamenides iraqensis (Fatima Shihab Al-Nasiri) 2018
