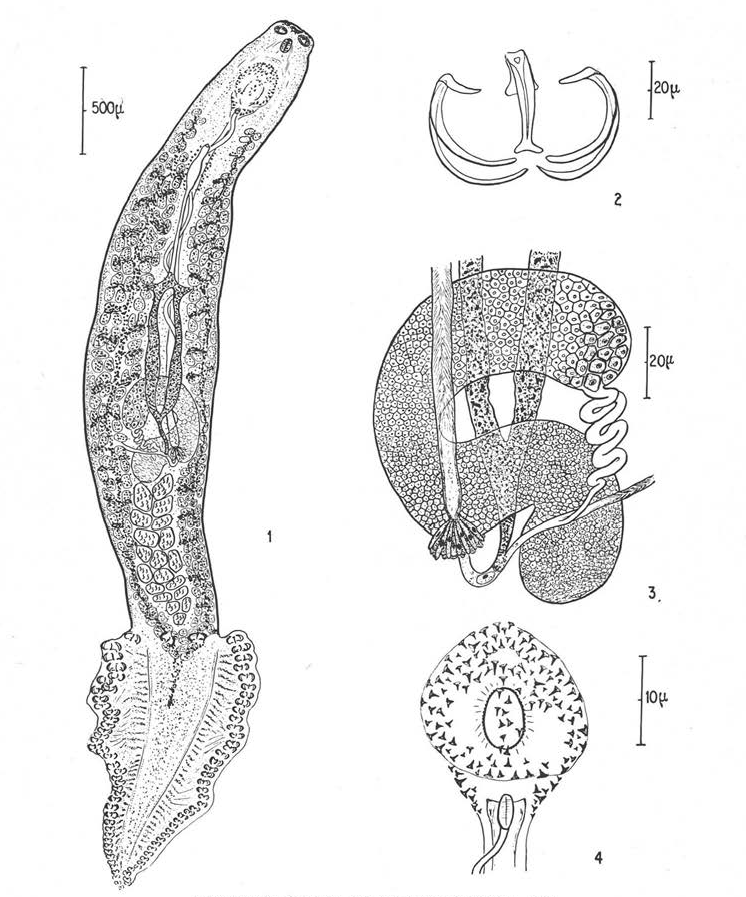
- Microcotyle donavini

Scientific classification
- Kingdom: Animalia
- Phylum: Platyhelminthes
- Class: Monogenea
- Order: Mazocraeidea
- Family: Microcotylidae
- Subfamily: Microcotylinae; Taschenberg, 1879

= Microcotylinae =

Subfamily of flatworms

Microcotylinae is a subfamily within family Microcotylidae and class Monogenea. This subfamily was created by Taschenberg in 1879.

== Species ==
According to the World Register of Marine Species, there are 29 genera in this subfamily:

- Atriostella Unnithan, 1971
- Bivagina Yamaguti, 1963
- Caballeraxine Lebedev, 1972
- Diplasiocotyle Sandars, 1944
- Diplostamenides Unnithan, 1971
- Gamacallum Unnithan, 1971
- Jaliscia Mamaev & Egorova, 1977
- Kahawaia Lebedev, 1969
- Lutianicola Lebedev, 1970
- Magniexcipula Bravo-Hollis, 1981
- Microcotyle Van Beneden & Hesse, 1863
- Microcotyloides Fujii, 1940
- Monomacracanthus Mamaev, 1976
- Neobivagina Dillon & Hargis, 1965>
- Omanicotyle Yoon, Al-Jufaili, Freeman, Bron, Paladini & Shinn, 2013
- Paracaesicola Zhou, Li, Liu, Ding & Yuan, 2020
- Paramicrocotyloides Rohde, 1978
- Paranaella Kohn, Baptista-Farias & Cohen, 2000
- Pauciconfibula Dillon & Hargis, 1965
- Polymicrocotyle Lamothe-Argumedo, 1967
- Polynemicola Unnithan, 1971
- Pseudoaspinatrium Mamaev, 1986
- Pseudobivagina Mamaev, 1986
- Pseudoneobivagina Mamaev, 1986
- Sciaenacotyle Mamaev, 1989
- Sebasticotyle Mamaev & Egorova, 1977
- Solostamenides Unnithan, 1971
- Vulvostella Unnithan, 1971
- Yogendrotrema Kumar & Agarwal, 1983
