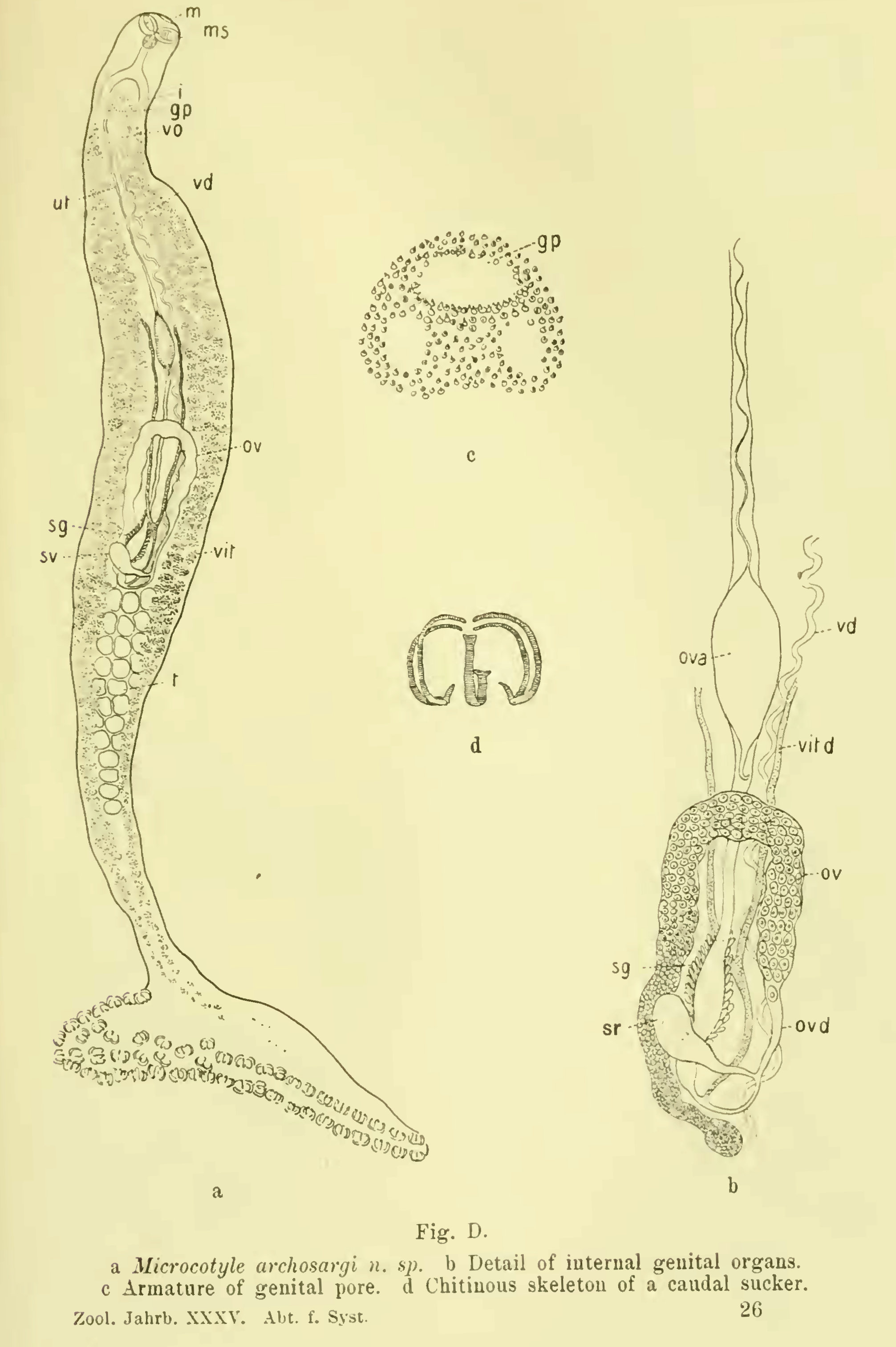
- Microcotyle archosargi, original description

Scientific classification
- Kingdom: Animalia
- Phylum: Platyhelminthes
- Class: Monogenea
- Order: Mazocraeidea
- Family: Microcotylidae
- Genus: Microcotyle
- Species: M. archosargi

Binomial name
- Microcotyle archosargi MacCallum, 1913

Synonyms
- Microcotyle Scintillovulva archosargi Unnithan, 1971 Paramicrocotyle archosargi (MacCallum, 1913) Caballero & Bravo-Hollis, 1965

= Microcotyle archosargi =

Species of worm

Microcotyle archosargi is a species of monogenean, parasitic on the gills of a marine fish. It belongs to the family Microcotylidae. It was first described by MacCallum in 1913 based on ten specimens. Hargis (1956) pointed out that the description and figures given by MacCallum were poor in details.

== Systematics ==
In 1971, Unnithan created the combination Microcotyle Scintillovulva archosargi, but Unnithan's assignment of ‘‘(MacCallum, 1913) comb. n.’’ as authorship of M. (S.) archosargi was considered incorrect according to the International Code of Zoological Nomenclature by Kritsky & Bakenhaster. Microcotyle archosargi was transferred by Caballero & Bravo-Hollis to the genus Paramicrocotyle as Paramicrocotyle archosargi n. comb. Mamaev, in his revision of the family Microcotylidae, suppressed this combination, reassigned the species to the genus Microcotyle and considered Paramicrocotyle a junior subjective synonym of Microcotyle.

== Morphology ==
Microcotyle archosargi has the general morphology of all species of Microcotyle, with a flat body, comprising an anterior part which contains most organs and a posterior part called the haptor. The haptor is symmetrical and bears a number of clamps, arranged as two rows, one on each side. The clamps of the haptor attach the animal to the gill of the fish. There are also two small buccal suckers at the anterior extremity. The digestive organs include an anterior, terminal mouth, a muscular pharynx, and a posterior intestine with two lateral blind-ending branches. Each adult contains male and female reproductive organs. The reproductive organs include an anterior genital atrium, with spines, a dorsal vagina, a single ovary, and a number of testes which are posterior to the ovary.

In 2011, Kritsky and Bakenhaster provided supplementary observations for M. archosargi based on examination of museum specimens and other specimens collected on Archosargus probatocephalus from Florida. The species was also redescribed by Mendoza-Franco et al. in 2018, from Archosargus rhomboidalis, including a drawing of the genital atrium. These authors also provided the first molecular data (28S ribosomal RNA) for Microcotyle archosargi.

== Etymology ==
The specific epithet Microcotyle archosargi is derived from the generic name of the host species Archosargus probatocephalus.

== Hosts and localities ==
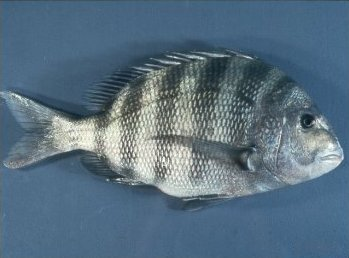
The type-host of Microcotyle archosargi is the sheepshead Archosargus probatocephalus

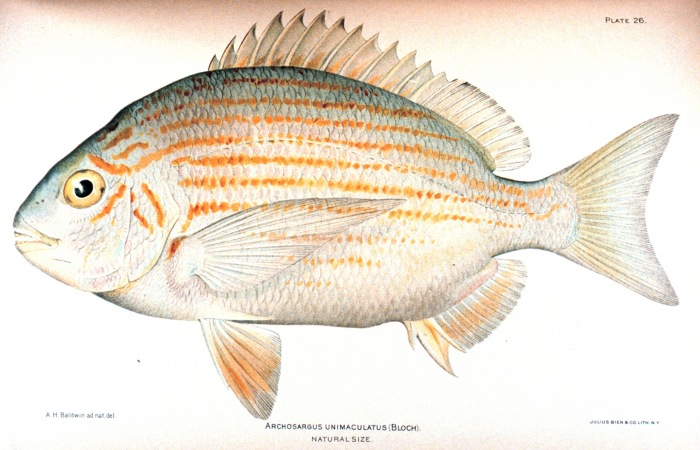
The western Atlantic seabream Archosargus rhomboidalis is also host of Microcotyle archosargi

The sheepshead Archosargus probatocephalus (Sparidae) is the type-host of Microcotyle archosargi. The species was first described from fish obtained by MacCallum from the New York fish market, as well as the New York Aquarium and the US Fish Commission at Woods Hole, Massachusetts. Despite the indirect source of the specimens, his host record is probably correct. M. archosargi has also been recorded in the type-host from Florida and Mexico, and in another sparid host, the western Atlantic seabream Archosargus rhomboidalis.
