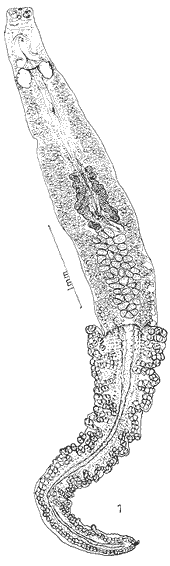
- Anchoromicrocotyle guaymensis (Type-species of Anchoromicrocotyle )

Scientific classification
- Kingdom: Animalia
- Phylum: Platyhelminthes
- Class: Monogenea
- Order: Mazocraeidea
- Family: Microcotylidae
- Subfamily: Anchoromicrocotylinae; Bravo-Hollis, 1981

= Anchoromicrocotylinae =

Subfamily of flatworms

Anchoromicrocotylinae is a subfamily of flatworms within the family Microcotylidae and class Monogenea. This subfamily was created by Bravo-Hollis in 1981, to accommodate Monogeneans recovered from the gills of Atractoscion nobilis (Sciaenidae) (synonym of Cynoscion nobilis ) caught off California. In the same work, Bravo-Hollis in 1981 created the new genus Anchoromicrocotyle and amended the diagnosis of the family Microcotylidae. Members of Anchoromicrocotylinae differ from other Microcotylidae by the presence of a larval organ and larval hooks and the structure of the genital complex.

== Morphology ==
Members of Anchoromicrocotylinae are characterized by a symmetric haptor, with a sharp end that bears three pairs of larval hooks. The digestive system includes two oral suckers with papillary borders, a pharynx and an esophagus. The male genital system includes numerous testes located behind the ovary (post-ovarian testes), a vas deferens and a complex male copulatory organ, composed of: a male atrium, a penis, and a prostate vesicle. The female genital system include a complex ovary, a genito-intestinal canal, an ootype, a uterus, and a single dorsal unarmed vagina.

== Species ==
According to the World Register of Marine Species, there are two genera in this subfamily:

- Anchoromicrocotyle Bravo-Hollis, 1981
- Cynoscionicola Price, 1962
