= Bivagina =

Scientific classification
- Kingdom: Animalia
- Phylum: Platyhelminthes
- Class: Monogenea
- Order: Mazocraeidea
- Family: Microcotylidae
- Subfamily: Microcotylinae
- Genus: Bivagina; Yamaguti, 1963

Genus of flatworms

Bivagina is a genus of monogeneans. As all Monogenea, species in the genus are ectoparasites that affect their host by attaching themselves as larvae on the gills of fish and grow into adult stage. This larval stage is called oncomiracidium, and is characterized as free swimming and ciliated.

== Taxonomy ==
This genus was proposed by Yamaguti in 1963 to accommodate Bivagina tai, Bivagina alcedinis, Bivagina australis, Bivagina baumi and Bivagina sillaginae, previously included in the genus Microcotyle.

== Description ==
Members of the genus Bivagina are characterised by a symmetrical haptor, a few testes, a cirrus and/or genital atrium unarmed and two vaginal pores armed or unarmed.

== Species ==
Currently ten species are recognized:

- Bivagina alcedinis (Parona & Perugia, 1889) Yamaguti, 1963
- Bivagina baumi (Sprehn, 1930) Yamaguti, 1963
- Bivagina centrodonti (Brown, 1929) Mamaev & Parukhin, 1975
- Bivagina pagrosomi (Murray, 1931) Dillon & Hargis, 1965
- Bivagina tai (Yamaguti, 1938) Yamaguti, 1963
- Bivagina australis (Murray, 1931) Yamaguti, 1963 currently included in Polylabroides as Polylabroides australis (Murray, 1931) Roubal, 1981
- Bivagina heterospina Mamaev & Parukhin, 1975 currently included in Omanicotyle as Omanicotyle heterospina (Mamaev & Parukhin, 1974) Yoon, Al-Jufaili, Freeman, Bron, Paladini & Shinn, 2013
- Bivagina kyphosi Yamaguti, 1968 included in Neobivagina as Neobivagina kyphosi (Yamaguti, 1968) Bravo-Hollis, 1979 then in Pseudobivagina as Pseudobivagina kyphosi (Yamaguti, 1968) Mamaev, 1986
- Bivagina punctipinnus Crane, 1972 included in Neobivagina as Neobivagina punctipinnus (Crane, 1972) Bravo-Hollis, 1979 then in Pseudobivagina as Pseudobivagina punctipinnus (Crane, 1972) Mamaev, 1986
- Bivagina sillaginae (Woolcock, 1936) currently included in Polylabris as Polylabris sillaginae (Woolcock, 1936)
