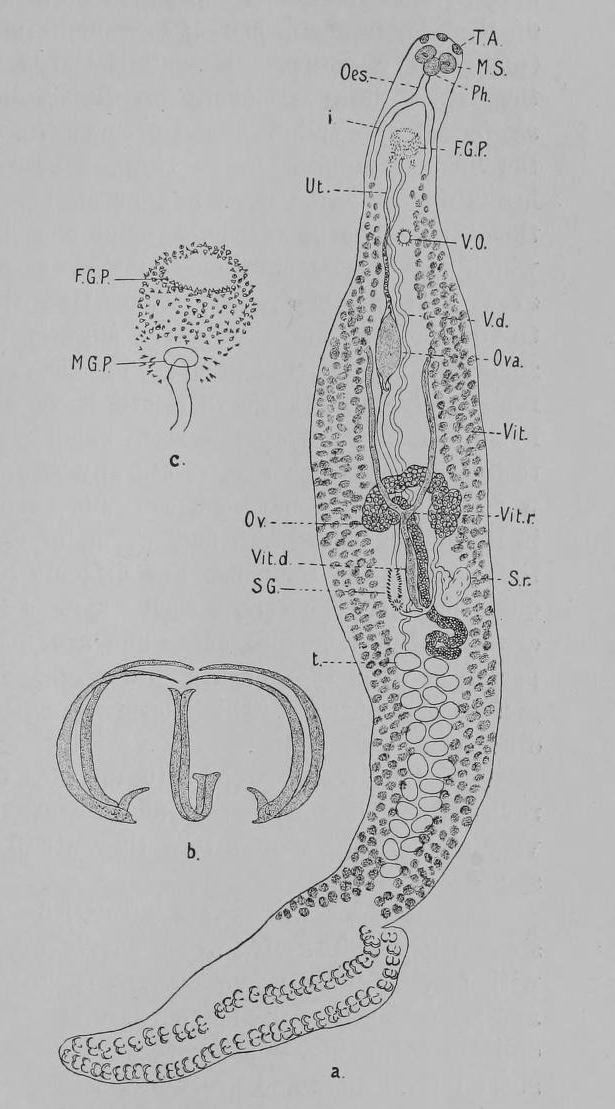
- Microcotyle pomacanthi, original description

Scientific classification
- Kingdom: Animalia
- Phylum: Platyhelminthes
- Class: Monogenea
- Order: Mazocraeidea
- Family: Microcotylidae
- Genus: Microcotyle
- Species: M. pomacanthi

Binomial name
- Microcotyle pomacanthi MacCallum, 1915

Synonyms
- Microcotyle pomocanthi MacCallum, 1915

= Microcotyle pomacanthi =

Species of worms

Microcotyle pomacanthi is a species of monogenean, parasitic on the gills of a marine fish. It belongs to the family Microcotylidae.

== Taxonomy ==
Microcotyle pomacanthi was described and illustrated based on specimens recovered from the gills of fishes from different genera and belonging to distinct families, from the New York Aquarium, as Microcotyle pomocanthi. In the original description, MacCallum stated that the specimens were so much alike and he hesitated to describe them as separate species. He considered that describing them under one name would point out the remarkable similarities. Dillon & Hargis redescribed and illustrated Microcotyle pomacanthi from the gills of the grass porgy Calamus arctifrons (Sparidae) off Florida, noted slight differences in the atrial spines and suggested that further study may show that MacCallum's (1915) description included more than one species, as he suggested. The "unnatural" list of hosts given in the original description may be due to unnatural source of the hosts, the New York Aquarium. Study of material from natural habitats is warranted to define clearly the hosts and the limits of host-specificity.

== Description ==
Microcotyle pomacanthi has the general morphology of all species of Microcotyle, with a symmetrical body, comprising an anterior part which contains most organs and a posterior part called the haptor. The haptor is symmetrical, and bears 50-78 clamps, arranged as two rows, one on each side. The clamps of the haptor attach the animal to the gill of the fish. There are also two buccal suckers obliquely placed at the sides of the mouth at the anterior extremity and divided by a partition. The digestive organs include an anterior, terminal mouth, a well developed pharynx, a rather short oesophagus and a posterior intestine with two lateral branches provided with numerous secondary branches. Each adult contains male and female reproductive organs. The reproductive organs include an anterior genital atrium opening just behind the bifurcation, armed with numerous spines, a medio-dorsal vagina, a single ovary, a somewhat indefinite elongated sac crossing the middle of the body and extending backward, and 18-27 testes which are posterior to the ovary. The eggs are provided posteriorly with a rather stout tapering prolongation, anteriorly with a similar elongated structure.

== Pathology ==
Many of the fish belonging to the families Chaetodontidae, Sparidae and Haemulidae obtained from the New York Aquarium were infected with Microcotyle pomacanthi; the monogenean could have caused the death of hosts especially for the Chaetodontidae.

== Hosts and localities ==
Microcotyle pomacanthi was described from specimens recovered from the gray angelfish Pomocanthus arcuatus (Pomacanthidae), the spotfin butterflyfish Chaetodon ocellatus and the foureye butterflyfish Chaetodon capistratus (Chaetodontidae), the porkfish Anisotremus virginicus (Haemulidae), the yellowedge grouper Hyporthodus flavolimbatus (referred to as Epinephelus flavolimbatusin the original description) (Serranidae), the Spanish hogfish Bodianus rufus (Labridae) (referred to as Harpe rufa in the original description) and the grass porgy Calamus arctifrons (Sparidae).

Microcotyle pomacanthi was first described from fishes from New York Aquarium. It was also reported from off Florida.

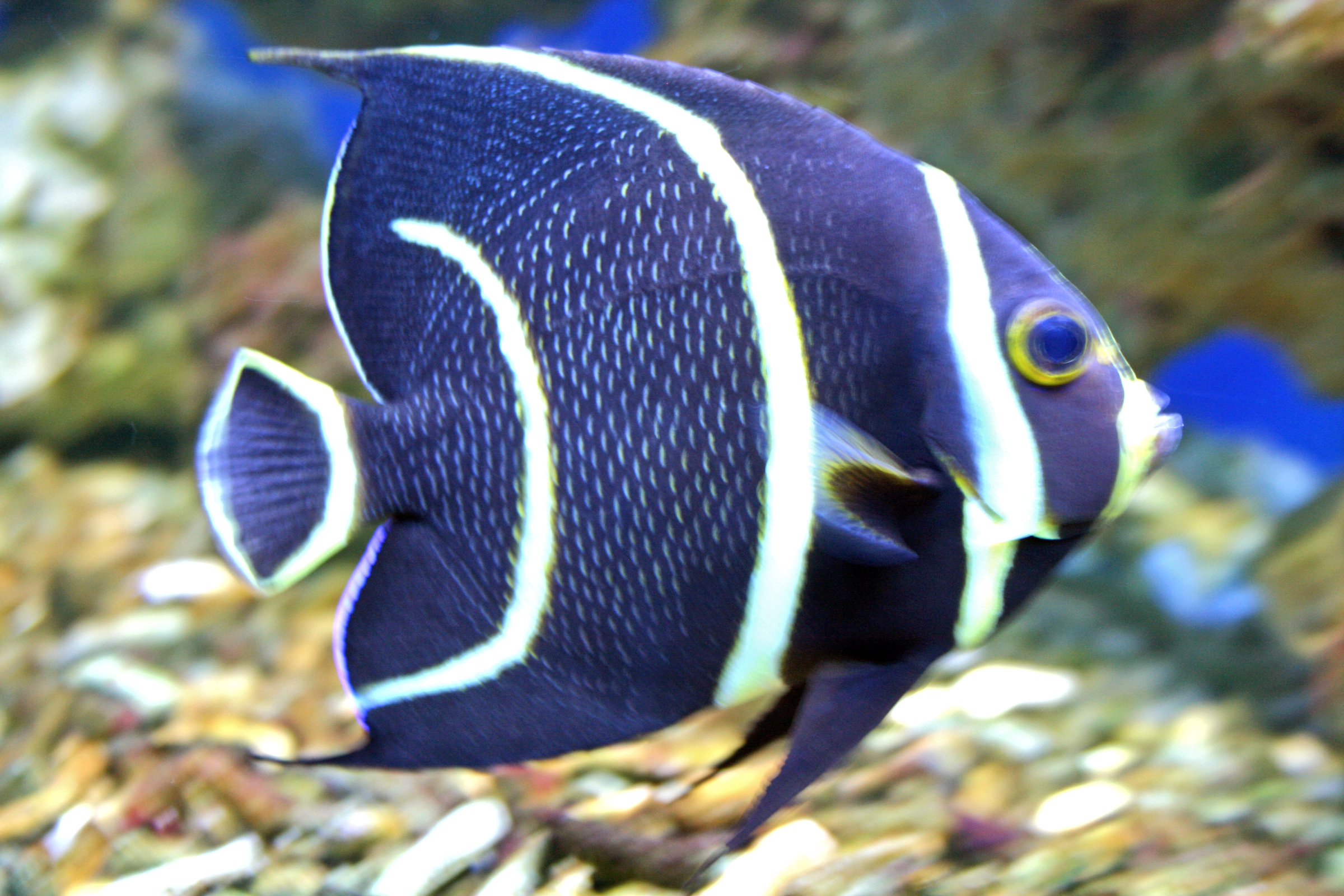
The gray angelfish

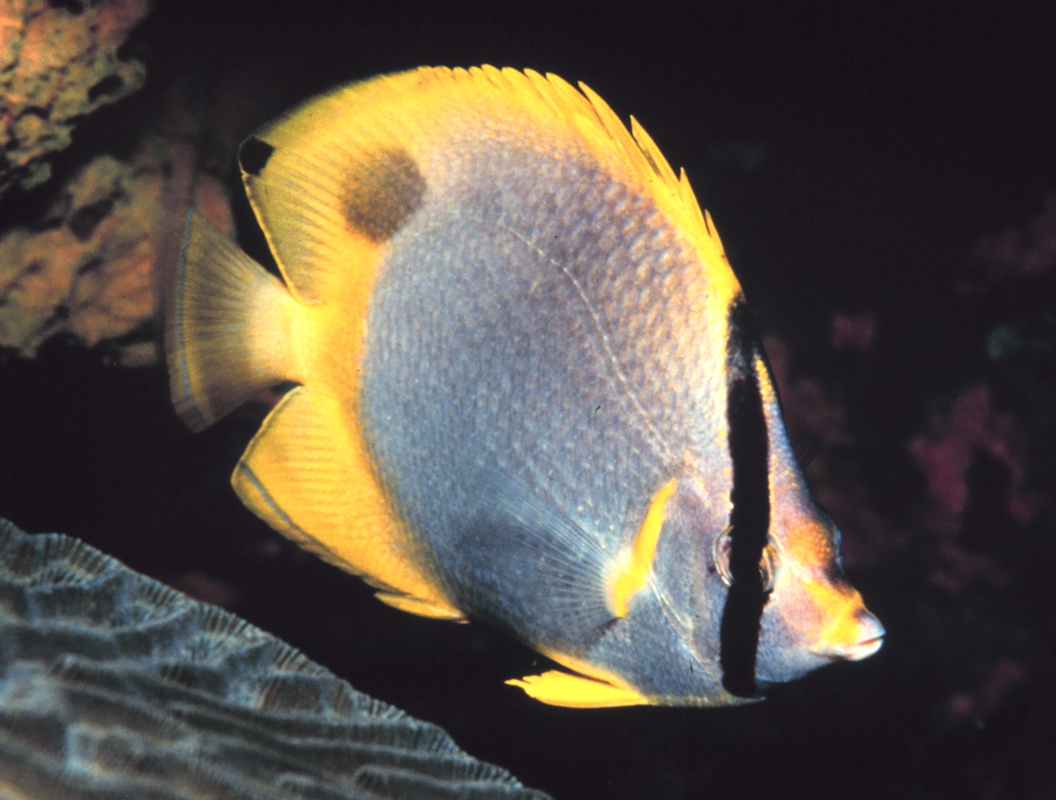
The spotfin butterflyfish

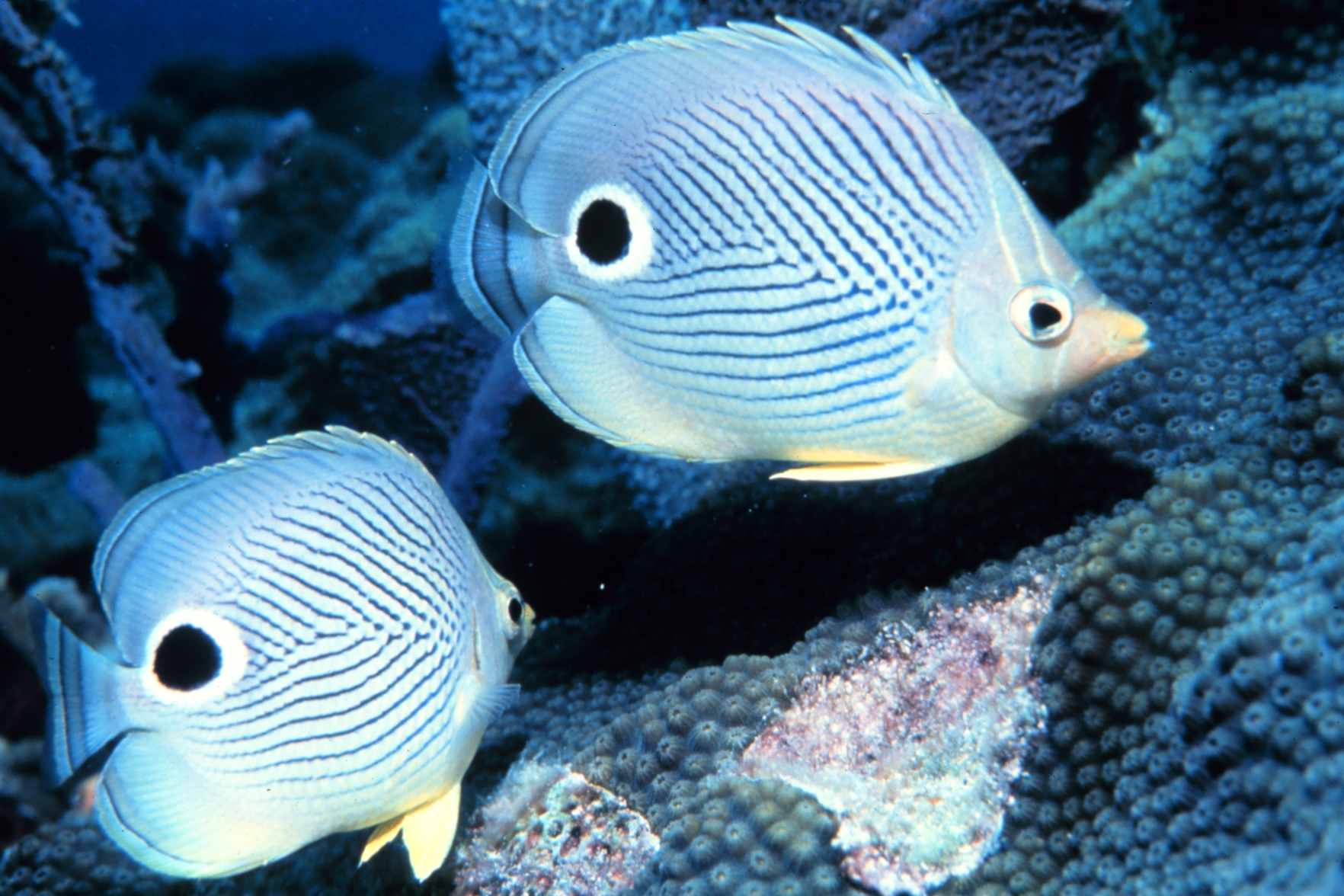
The foureye butterflyfish

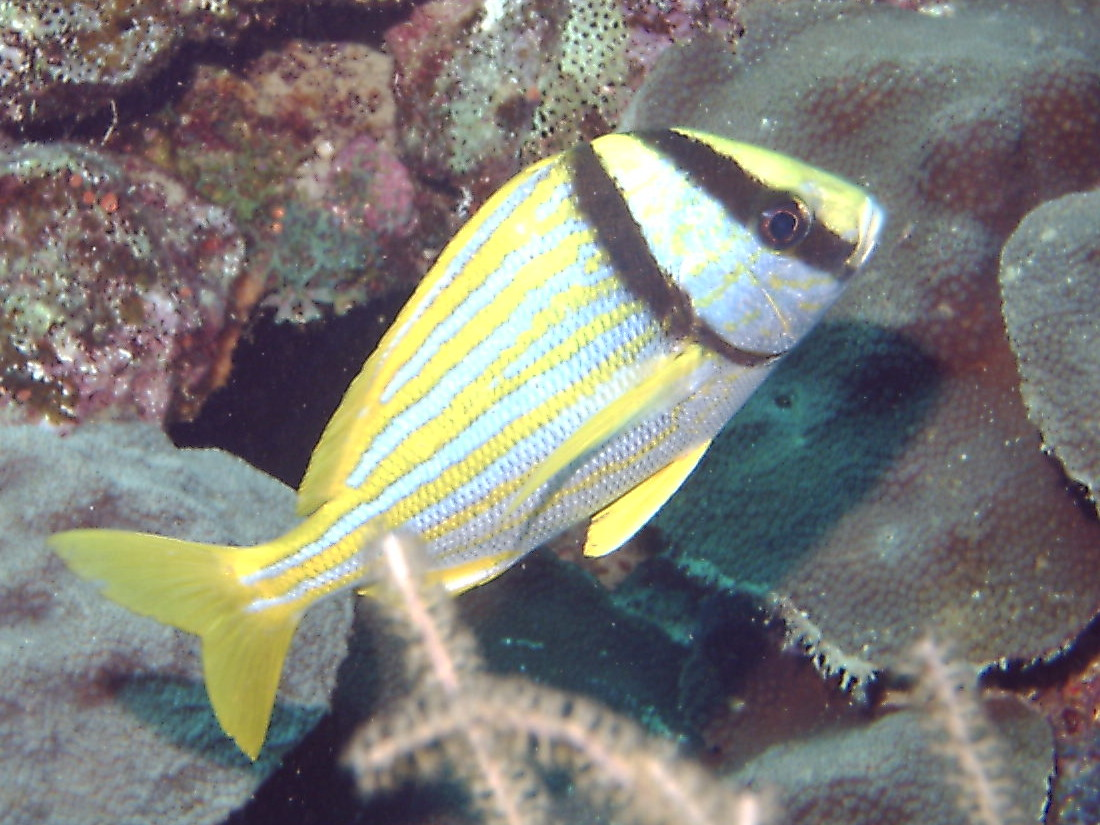
The porkfish

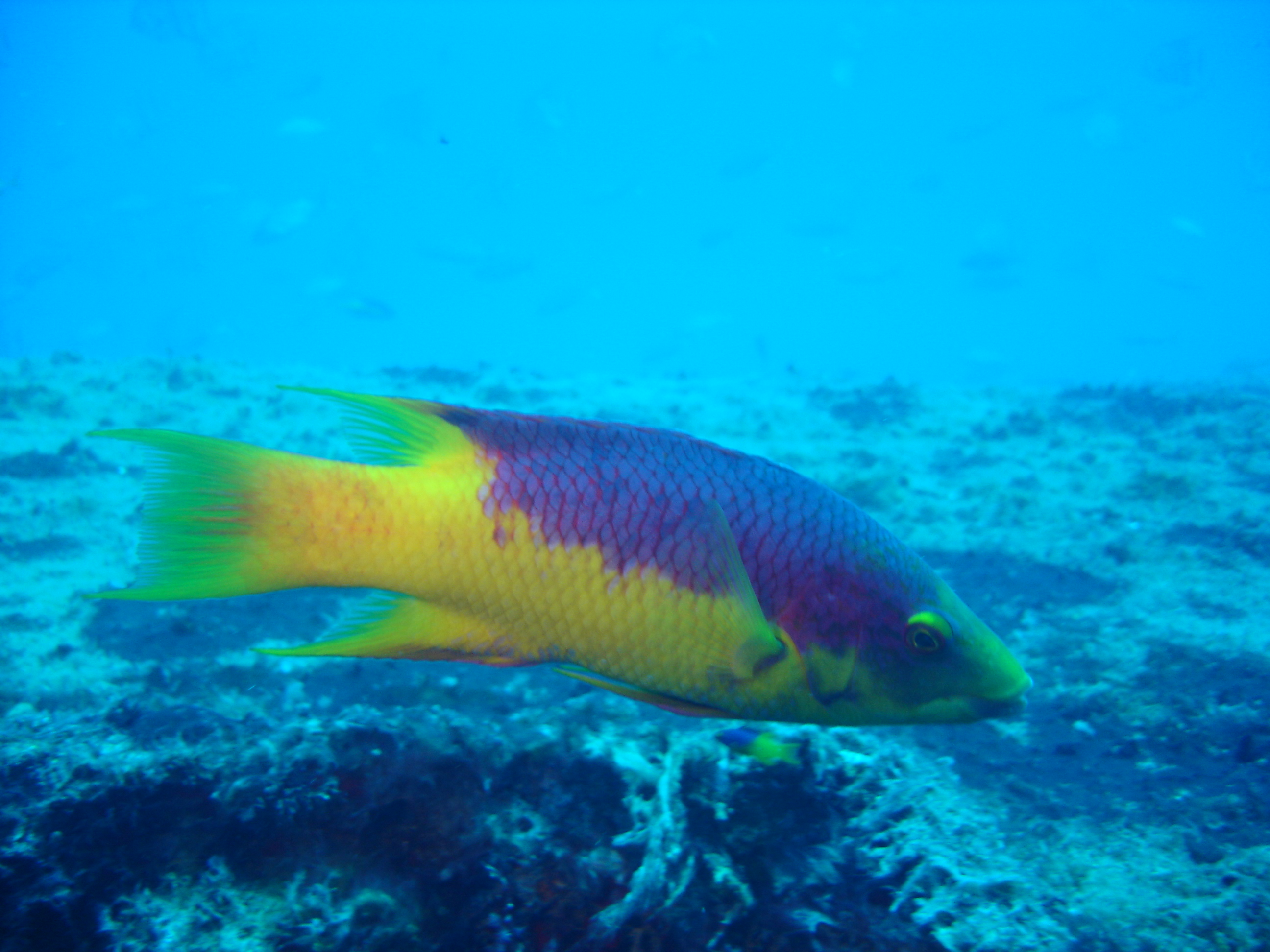
The Spanish hogfish

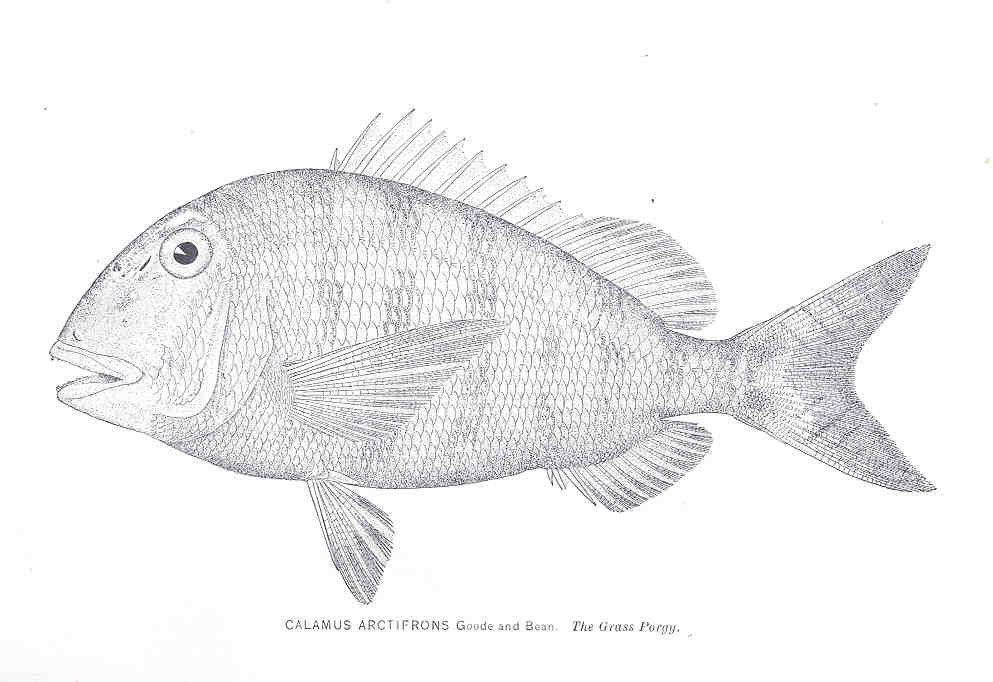
The grass porgy
