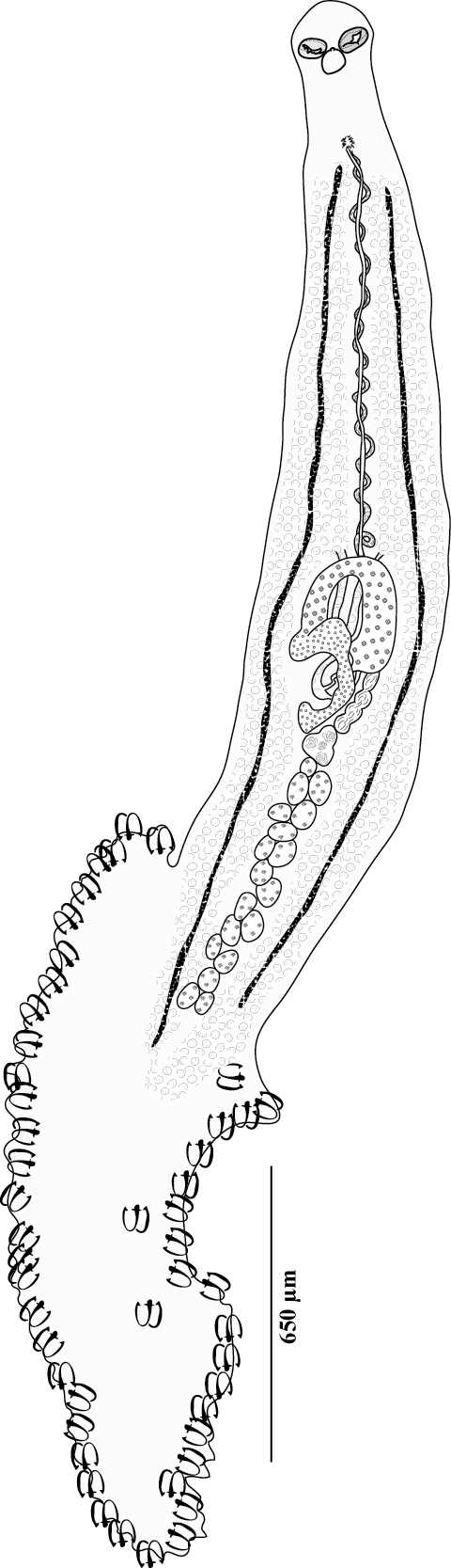
- Intracotyle hannibali

Scientific classification
- Kingdom: Animalia
- Phylum: Platyhelminthes
- Class: Monogenea
- Order: Mazocraeidea
- Family: Microcotylidae
- Subfamily: Metamicrocotylinae; Yamaguti, 1953

= Metamicrocotylinae =

Subfamily of flatworms

Metamicrocotylinae is a subfamily within family Microcotylidae and class Monogenea. This subfamily was created by Yamaguti in 1963

== Species ==
According to the World Register of Marine Species, there are two genera in this subfamily:

- Intracotyle Mamaev, 1970
- Metamicrocotyla Yamaguti, 1953
