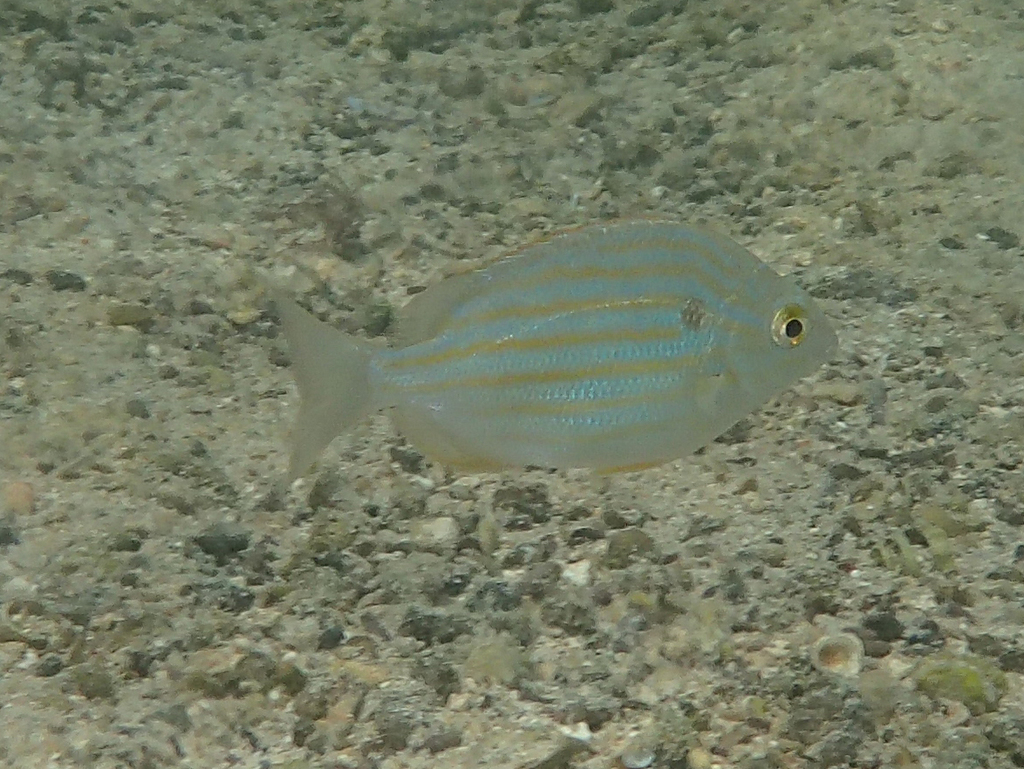

Conservation status
- Least Concern (IUCN 3.1)

Scientific classification
- Kingdom: Animalia
- Phylum: Chordata
- Class: Actinopterygii
- Order: Acanthuriformes
- Family: Sparidae
- Genus: Archosargus
- Species: A. pourtalesii

Binomial name
- Archosargus pourtalesii (Steindachner, 1881)

Synonyms
- Sargus pourtalesii Steindachner, 1881

= Archosargus pourtalesii =

Species of fish

Archosargus pourtalesii, the blackspot porgy or Galápagos seabream, is a species of marine ray-finned fish belonging to the family Sparidae, the seabreams and porgies. This fish is endemic to the Galápagos Islands in the eastern Pacific Ocean.

== Taxonomy ==
Archosargus pourtalesii was first formally described as Sargus pourtalesii in 1881 by the Austrian ichthyologist Franz Steindachner with its type locality given as the Galápagos Islands. The genus Archosargus is placed in the family Sparidae within the order Spariformes by the 5th edition of Fishes of the World. Some authorities classify this genus in the subfamily Sparinae, but the 5th edition of Fishes of the World does not recognise subfamilies within the Sparidae.

== Etymology ==
Archosargus pourtalesii has a specific name honouring the Swiss-born American marine biologist Louis François de Pourtalès who was a companion of Louis Agassiz on the Hassler's 1871-1872 voyage from Boston to San Francisco via the Strait of Magellan, it was on this voyage that the type was collected.

== Description ==
Archosargus pourtalesii has an oval shaped, deep, laterally compressed body with a small blunt head, the dorsal and ventral profiles of the head being convex. It has moderately sized eyes, a small horizontal mouth and the preorbital bone overlaps the rear of the maxilla. The teeth at the front of the jaw are broad and flattened, the upper jaw has three rows of molar-like teeth at the sides. The margin of the preoperculum is smooth, with no serrations or spines. The dorsal fin is long and not high and is supported by 12 or 13 spines, the front spine points towards the front and may be embedded, and 9 or 10 soft rays. The anal fin contains 3 spines, the second spine being very robust, and 9 or 10 soft rays. The pectoral fin is long, clearly greater in length than the pelvic fins. It is pale blue on the upper body and silvery on the lower body with 7 longitudinal gold stripes along the flanks and a black spot high on the flank above the pectoral fin. This species has a maximum published total length of 36.5 cm (14.4 in).

== Distribution and habitat ==
Archosargus pourtalesii is found in the Eastern Pacific Ocean where it is endemic to the waters around the Galápagos Islands where it is found in shallow waters at depths between 1 and 30 m (3 ft 3 in and 98 ft 5 in) of sheltered bays and lagoons close to mangroves, as well as in sheltered areas of sand substrate.

== Biology ==
Archosargus pourtalesii is an omnivore and has been recorded as eating seaweeds, seagrasses, benthic molluscs, benthic worms, benthic crustaceans and zooplankton.

== Fisheries ==
Archosargus pourtalesii is sometimes caught by nets set illegally by fishers, however, its flesh is not highly valued and does not get a high price in markets.
