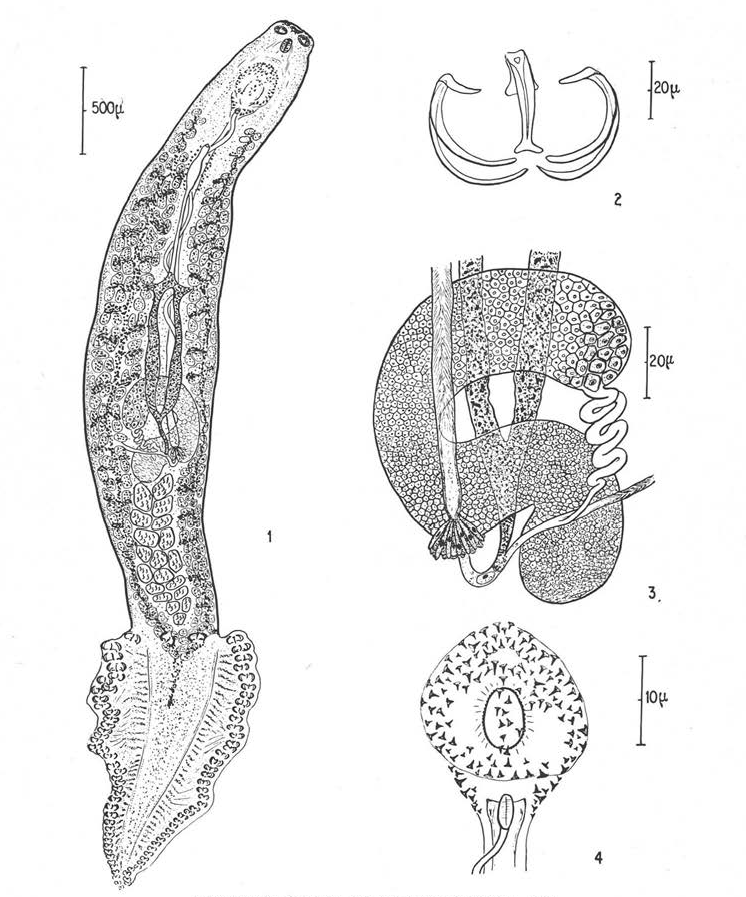
- Microcotyle donavini, body and various parts

Scientific classification
- Kingdom: Animalia
- Phylum: Platyhelminthes
- Class: Monogenea
- Order: Mazocraeidea
- Family: Microcotylidae
- Genus: Microcotyle
- Species: M. donavini

Binomial name
- Microcotyle donavini Van Beneden & Hesse, 1863

= Microcotyle donavini =

Species of worms

Microcotyle donavini is a species of monogenean, parasitic on the gills of a marine fish. It belongs to the family Microcotylidae.

== Taxonomy ==
Microcotyle donavini was described by Van Beneden & Hesse in 1863. This species was redescribed by Scott (1905) who gave one figure and by Euzet & Marc in 1963, one hundred years later.

Microcotyle donavini is the type-species of the genus Microcotyle. Unnithan (1971) placed M. donavini in the nominal subgenus Microcotyle as Microcotyle (Microcotyle) donavini. However, this species was returned to the genus Microcotyle by Mamaev in 1986.

== Morphology ==
Microcotyle donavini has the general morphology of all species of Microcotyle, with a symmetrical body, comprising an anterior part which contains most organs and a posterior part called the haptor. The haptor is symmetrical, and bears 86 clamps, arranged as two rows, one on each side. The clamps of the haptor attach the animal to the gill of the fish. There are also two buccal oval suckers, septated, located at the anterior extremity. The digestive organs include an anterior, terminal mouth, a pharynx, an oesophagus and a posterior intestine with two lateral branches provided with numerous secondary branches. Each adult contains male and female reproductive organs. The reproductive organs include an anterior oval genital atrium, armed with numerous small spines, a medio-dorsal vagina opening at 750 μm from the anterior extremity, a single ovary and 18-22 oval testes which are posterior to the ovary. The eggs are fusiform, with a filament at each pole; one is short and thick.

== Hosts and localities ==
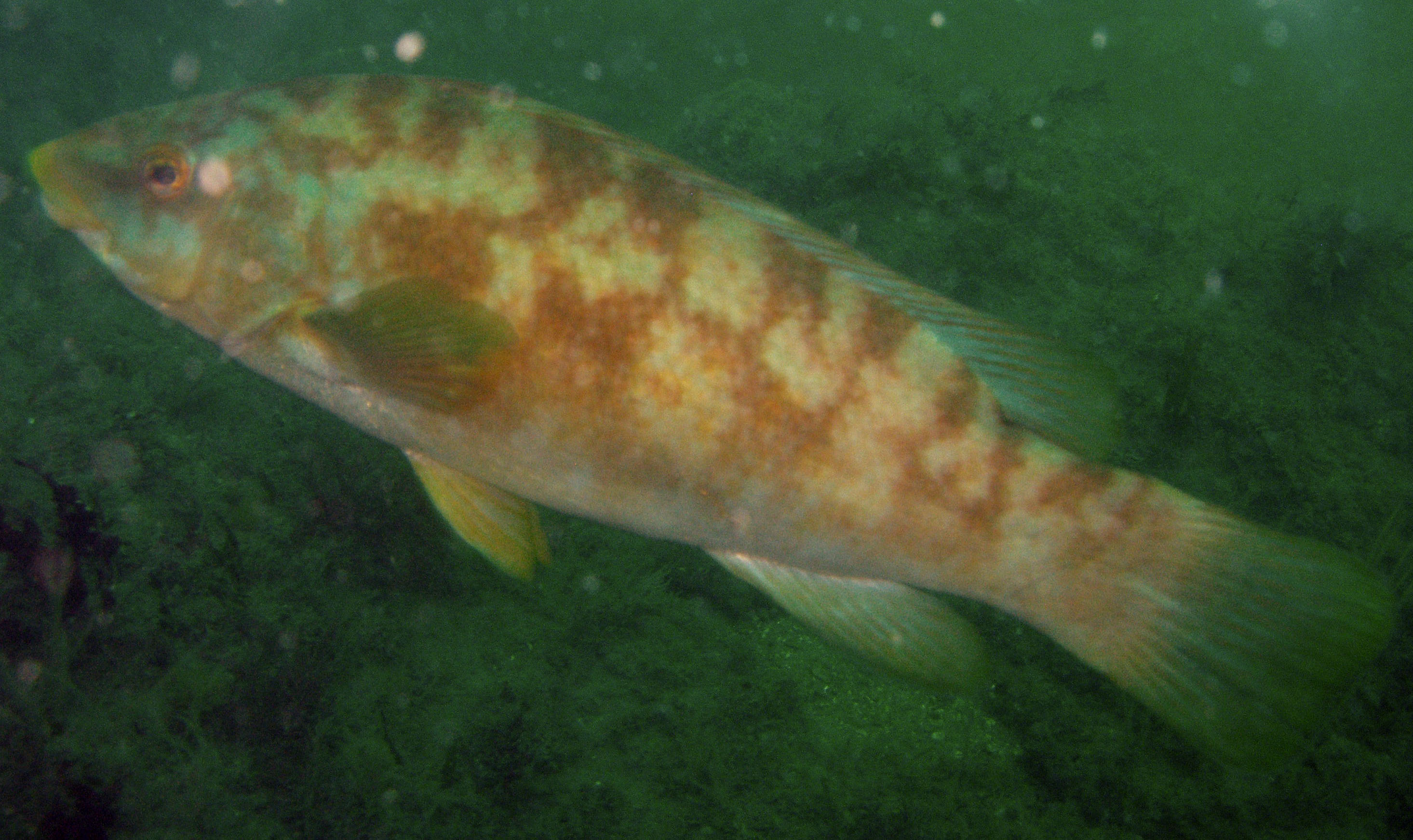
Labrus bergylta is the type host of Microcotyle donavini

The host-type is Labrus bergylta. The type-locality is off Brest, France.

== Gallery ==
Drawings of various organs or stages of Microcotyle donavini, by Euzet & Marc, 1963.

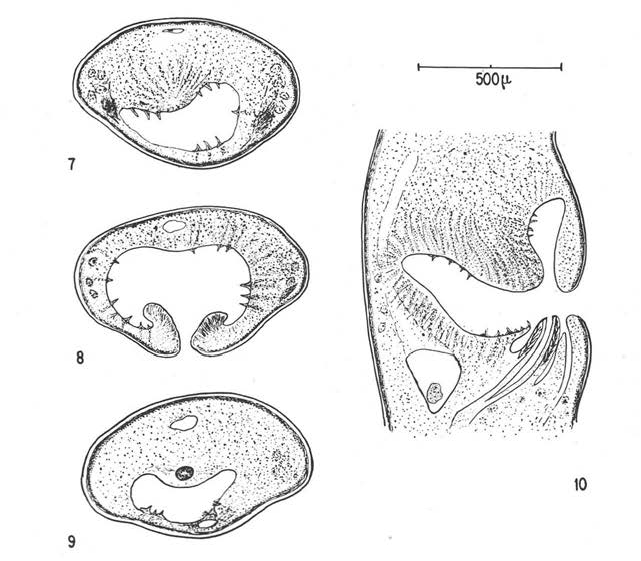
Section of genital atrium

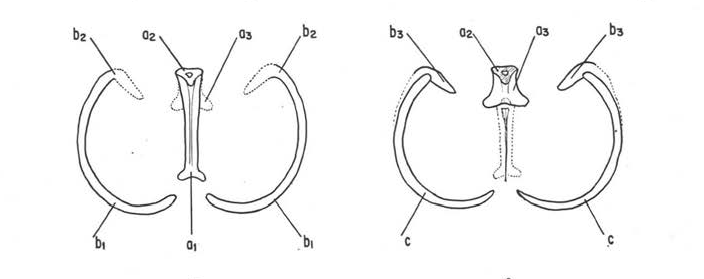
Clamp

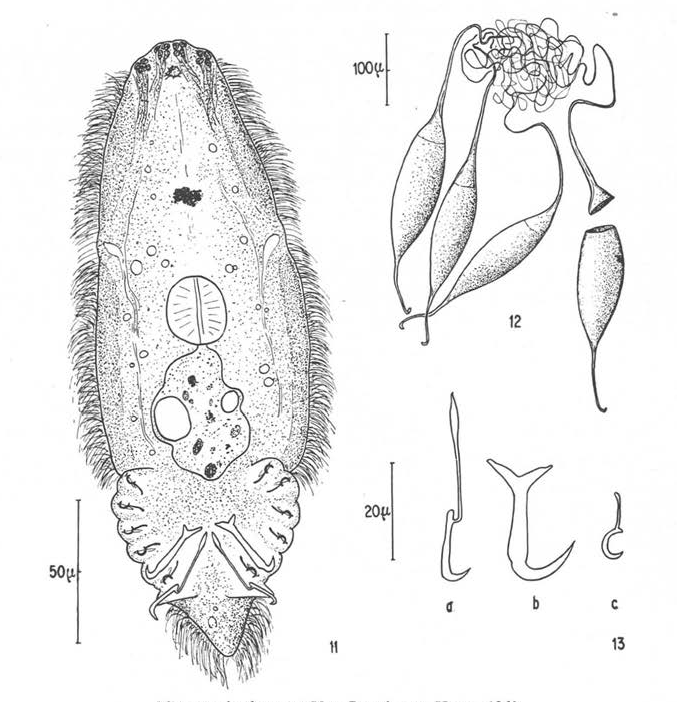
Oncomiracidium & egg

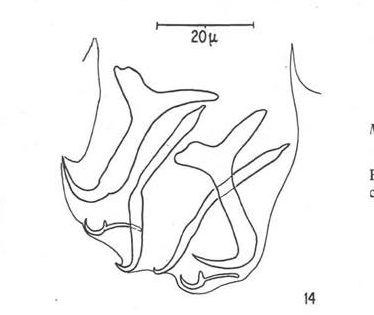
Lappet at extremity of haptor
