= Atriasterinae =

Scientific classification
- Kingdom: Animalia
- Phylum: Platyhelminthes
- Class: Monogenea
- Order: Mazocraeidea
- Family: Microcotylidae
- Subfamily: Atriasterinae; Maillard & Noisy, 1979

Subfamily of flatworms

Atriasterinae is a subfamily within family Microcotylidae and class Monogenea. This subfamily was created by Maillard & Noisy in 1979.

== Species ==
According to the World Register of Marine Species, there are five genera in this subfamily:

- Atriaster Lebedev & Parukhin, 1969
- Atrispinum Euzet & Maillard, 1974
- Bychowskicotyla Unnithan, 1971
- Serranicotyle Maillard, Euzet & Silan, 1988
- Sparicotyle Mamaev, 1984
