= Prosomicrocotylinae =

Scientific classification
- Kingdom: Animalia
- Phylum: Platyhelminthes
- Class: Monogenea
- Order: Mazocraeidea
- Family: Microcotylidae
- Subfamily: Prosomicrocotylinae; Yamaguti, 1963

Subfamily of flatworms

Prosomicrocotylinae is a subfamily within family Microcotylidae and class Monogenea. Members of Prosomicrocotylinae are characterized by their haptor divided into two separate marginal frills, each of which extends along lateral margin of body proper.

== Species ==
According to the World Register of Marine Species, this subfamily includes one genus:

- Prosomicrocotyla Yamaguti, 1958
