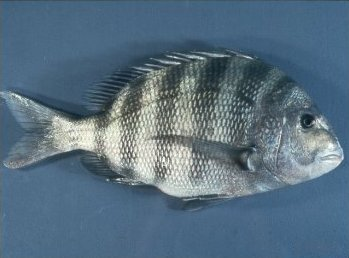
- Archosargus probatocephalus

Scientific classification
- Kingdom: Animalia
- Phylum: Chordata
- Class: Actinopterygii
- Division: Teleostei
- Order: Acanthuriformes
- Family: Sparidae
- Genus: Archosargus; Gill, 1865

Type species
- Sparus probatocephalus Walbaum, 1792

Synonyms
- Salema D. S. Jordan * Evermann

= Archosargus =

Genus of fishes

Archosargus is a genus of marine ray-finned fishes belonging to the family Sparidae, the sea breams and porgies. These fishes occur in the Western Atlantic and Eastern Pacific Oceans.

== Taxonomy ==
Archosargus was first proposed as a monospecific genus in 1865 by the American biologist Theodore Gill with Sparus probatocephalus as its only species. S. probatocephalus had originally been formally described in 1792 by the German naturalist Johann Julius Walbaum with its type locality not given but it is thought to be New York. The genus Archosargus is placed in the family Sparidae within the order Spariformes by the 5th edition of Fishes of the World. Some authorities classify this genus in the subfamily Sparinae, but the 5th edition of Fishes of the World does not recognise subfamilies within the Sparidae.

== Etymology ==
Archosargus combines archon, meaning "ruler", and sagrus, a Greek name for seabreams dating as far back as Aristotle, although in this case Gill was probably referencing Sargus, a synonym of Diplodus. Gill described A. probatocephalus as "pre-eminent among the Sparoids for the delicacy of its flesh as well as its size".

== Species ==
Archosargus contains the following species:

- Archosargus pourtalesii (Steindachner, 1881) (Blackspot porgy, Galápagos seabream)
- Archosargus probatocephalus (Walbaum, 1792) (Sheepshead)
- Archosargus rhomboidalis (Linnaeus, 1758) (Western Atlantic seabream)

Archosargus aries (Valenciennes, 1830) is a synonym of Archosargus probatocephalus

== Characteristics ==
Archosargus seabreams have oval rather compressed bodies with jumped backs, small heads and pointed snouts. Both the dorsal and ventral profiles of the head are convex. They have small mouths and the preorbital bone overlaps the rear of the maxilla. The teeth at the front of the jaw are broad and flattened, and the upper jaw has three rows of molar-like teeth at the sides. The dorsal fin is long and not high and is supported by 12 spines. The front spine points anteriorly and may be embedded in skin. There are three short spines in the anal fin. The pectoral fins are much longer than the pelvic fins. The cheeks and gill covers are typically scaly but the snout is naked. The largest species in the genus is A. probatocephalus with a maximum published total length of 91 cm (36 in) while the smallest is A. rhomboidalis which has a maximum published total length of 33 cm (13 in).

== Distribution and habitat ==
Archosargus seabreams are found in the Americas. Three species are found in the Western Atlantic, from Canada south to Brazil, with the fourth species, A. pourtalesii In the Galápagos Islands of the Eastern Pacific Ocean. These fishes are coastal, often entering brackish waters and even up into the freshwater of the lower reaches of rivers.

== Fisheries ==
Archosargus seabreams are fished for both commercially and recreationally. The smaller species are not highly valued as food fish but are used to make fish meal. The sheepshead (A. probatocephalus) is caught as a food fish, subjected to overfishing in the past, and is again becoming more important to commercial fisheries in the Gulf of Mexico as more desirable species, like red drum (Sciaenops ocellatus), decrease through overfishing.
