= Syncoelicotylinae =

Scientific classification
- Kingdom: Animalia
- Phylum: Platyhelminthes
- Class: Monogenea
- Order: Mazocraeidea
- Family: Microcotylidae
- Subfamily: Syncoelicotylinae; Mamaev & Zubchenko, 1978

Subfamily of flatworms

Syncoelicotylinae is a subfamily within family Microcotylidae and class Monogenea.

Members of Syncoelicotylinae are characterised by a symmetrical haptor with two separate lobes.

== Species ==
According to the World Register of Marine Species, there are three genera in this subfamily:

- Syncoelicotyle Mamaev & Zubchenko, 1978
- Syncoelicotyloides Mamaev & Brashovian, 1989
- Tinrovia Mamaev, 1987
