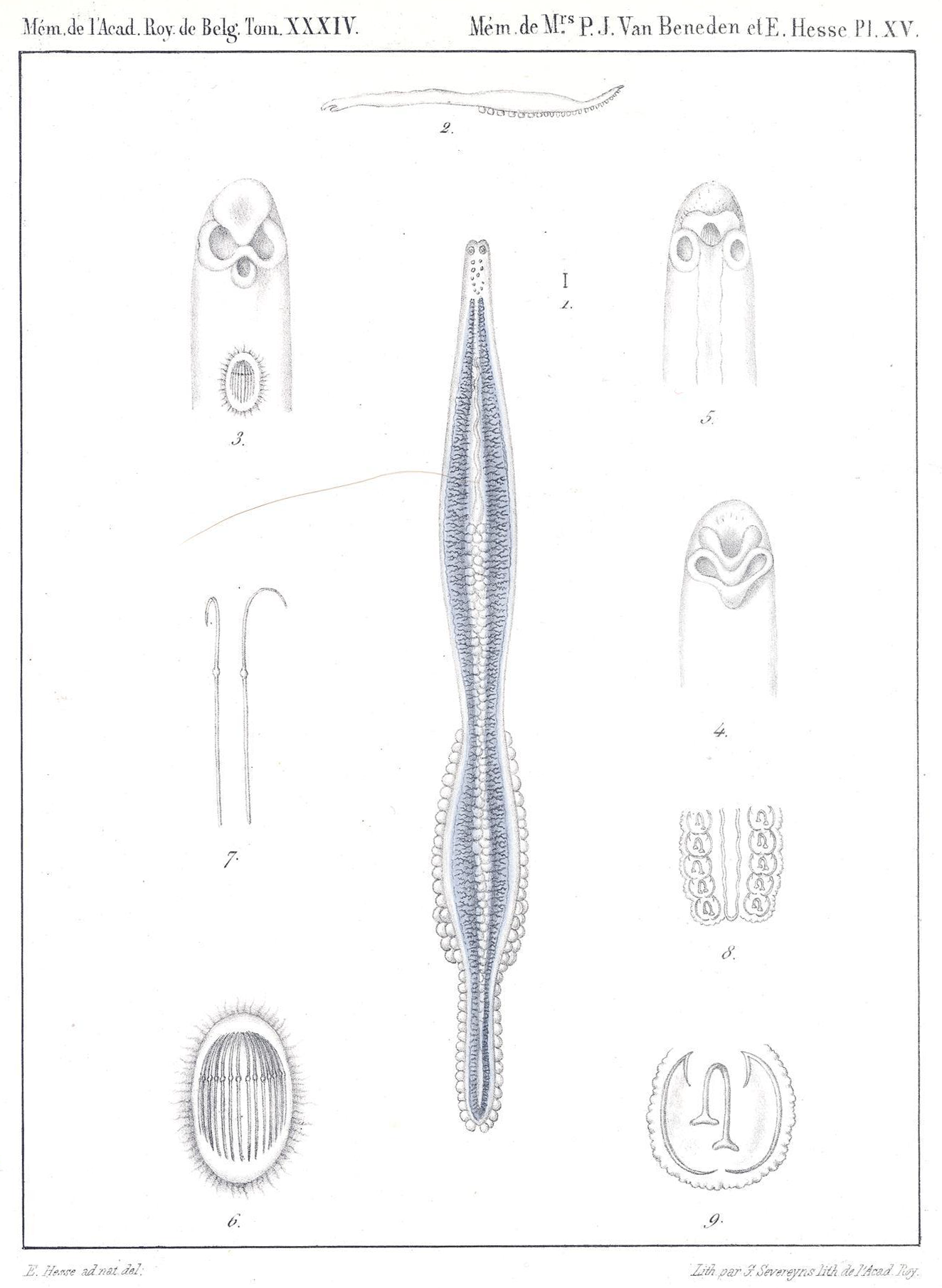
- Sparicotyle chrysophrii, original description in Van Beneden & Hesse, 1863

Scientific classification
- Kingdom: Animalia
- Phylum: Platyhelminthes
- Class: Monogenea
- Order: Mazocraeidea
- Family: Microcotylidae
- Genus: Sparicotyle
- Species: S. chrysophrii

Binomial name
- Sparicotyle chrysophrii (Van Beneden & Hesse, 1863) Mamaev, 1984

Synonyms
- Microcotyle chrysophrii Van Beneden & Hesse, 1863

= Sparicotyle chrysophrii =

Species of worms

Sparicotyle chrysophrii is a species of monogenean, parasitic on the gills of the marine fish. It belongs to the family Microcotylidae. Its type-host is the gilt-head seabream (Sparus aurata).

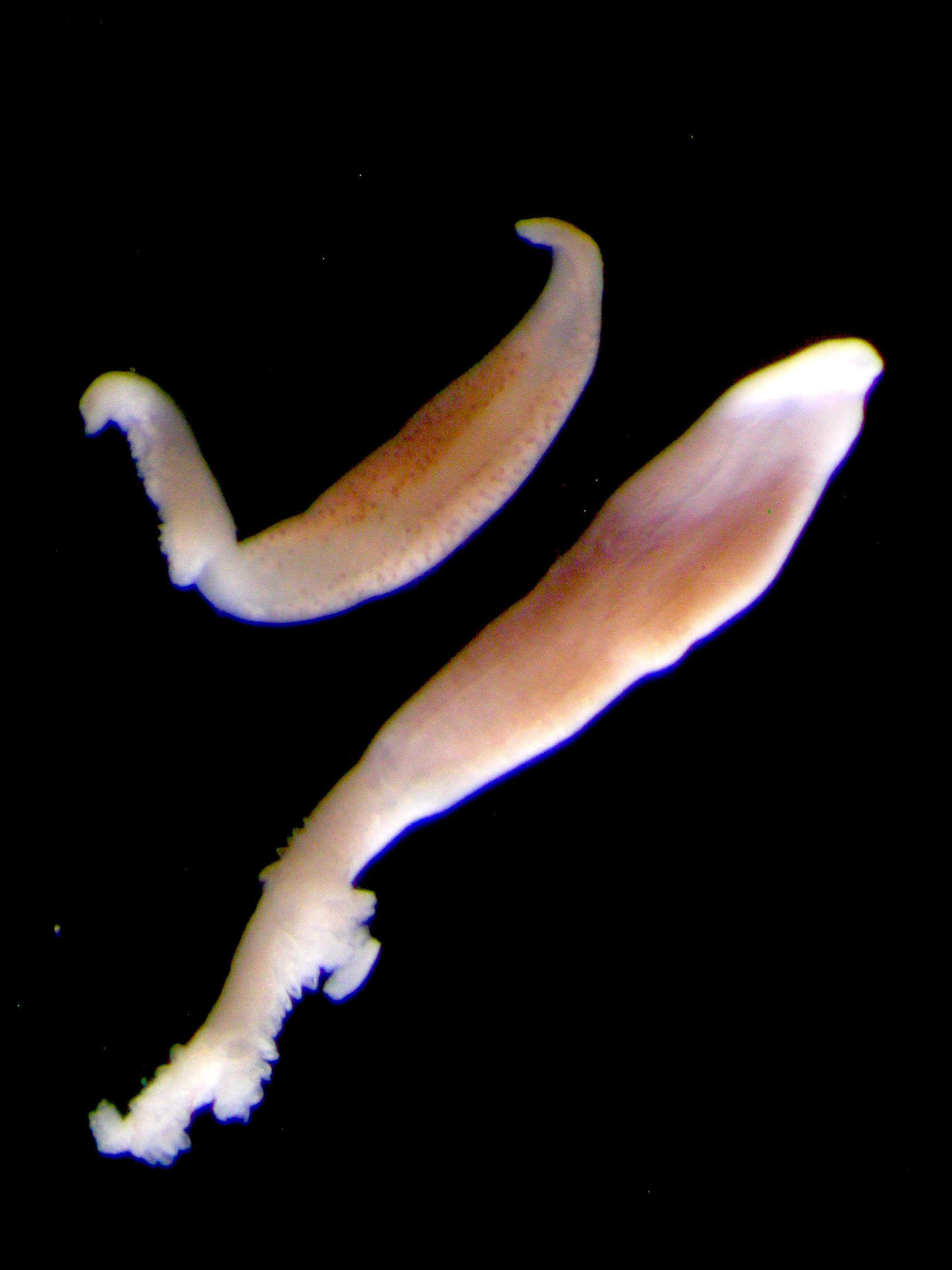
Figure 2: Two specimens of the monogenean Sparicotyle chrysophrii viewed under the stereomicroscope isolated from the gills of farmed gilt-head seabream Sparus aurata.

The species was described by Van Beneden & Hesse in 1863 under the name Microcotyle chrysophrii and transferred to the genus Sparicotyle (Figure 2-4) by Mamaev in 1984. Its morphology has been described in 2010 from specimens collected off Corsica by Antonelli et al.

It is ubiquitous and abundant in the aquatic environment, isolated from fish as ectoparasite on gill filaments. S. chrysophrii is specific but not limited to the gilt-head seabream (Sparus aurata), causing mortalities when contacted at high prevalence (61.5%) in fish cages. It has been suggested that wild fish, mostly sparids that aggregate around aquaculture fish cages, can act as the infection reservoir for the fish in cages. It has been suggested that overcrowding in fish cages can also increase its transmission.

As all monogeneans, it is hermaphroditic. Gravid specimens release eggs into the sea where they continue to develop and hatch into oncomiracidia – free swimming ciliated larva that eventually finds and attaches to the host.

An infection by S. chrysophrii causes lethargy due to the hypoxia, "necrosis of gill filaments" and severe anaemia, with several histopathological effects: lamellar shortening, clubbing and synechiae, proliferation of the epithelial tissue with resulting fusion of the secondary lamellae, and marked presence of chloride cell, which may lead to death.

Economic impact encompasses direct losses from the mortalities and the cost of treatment. It has been suggested that the monogenean causes an increase by >0.4 of the total feed conversion rate (FCR) of the infected gilt-head seabream, which translates in an increased feed requirement for over 50,000 tons during the production (Rigos G., unpubl. data).

== Taxonomy ==
Phylum: Platyhelminthes, class: Monogenea, order: Mazocraeidea, family: Microcotylidae, genus: Sparicotyle, species: Sparicotyle chrysophrii. The species was originally described by Van Beneden and Hesse in 1863 under the name Microcotyle chrysophrii and transferred to the genus Sparicotyle by Mamaev in 1984. Its morphology has been described from specimens collected off Corsica by Antonelli et al.

== Life cycle ==
All monogeneans are hermaphroditic. Gravid parasites release eggs into the sea where they continue to develop and hatch into oncomiracidia – free swimming ciliated larva. Hatching starts five days (20 °C) after deposition of the eggs and can be prolonged up to the day 10 (20 °C). Oncomiracidia can survive maximally 52 h (20 °C) in the sea water column, after which they need to find a suitable host. Eggs of S. chrysophrii (Figure 5) are ovoid with two tendril-like projections that allow the egg to attach to potential substrate, such as cage nets, biofouling and lamellar epithelium.

== Pathology and clinical signs ==
An infection by S. chrysophrii causes lethargy due to the hypoxia and severe anaemia. Sitjà-Bobadilla et al. evidenced the following histopatological effects: lamellar shortening, clubbing and synechiae, proliferation of the epithelial tissue with resulting fusion of the secondary lamellae, and marked presence of chloride cells. S. chrysophrii causes severe pathogenicity (gill lesions, systemic anemia, lamellae fusion, sloughing of epithel cells) even at the low infection intensity (eight parasites per gill arch). De Vico et al. observed that in infected seabreams' spleen there was a dramatic increase in size and number of splenic melanomacrophage centres, suggesting increased levels of the hemosiderin (resulting from the erythrocyte's destruction) and lipofuscin, common in tissue catabolism and degenerative chronic disorders. Secondary infections with other parasites and bacteria are common for the S. chrysophrii-infected seabream.

== Impact ==
In the experimental studies, fingerling seabream (30 g) had prevalence up to 100%, and the larger fish (150 g) 96.6%. Some authors found positive correlation between increase of sexual hormone levels and susceptibility to monogeneans, while others suggest that in the larger fish, water current passing through the gills is stronger than in the smaller fish, therefore disabling the settlement of oncomiracidia.

== Diagnosis ==
S. chrysophrii infection is diagnosed by examining the gills under the stereomicroscope and determining the presence of the different parasite stages.

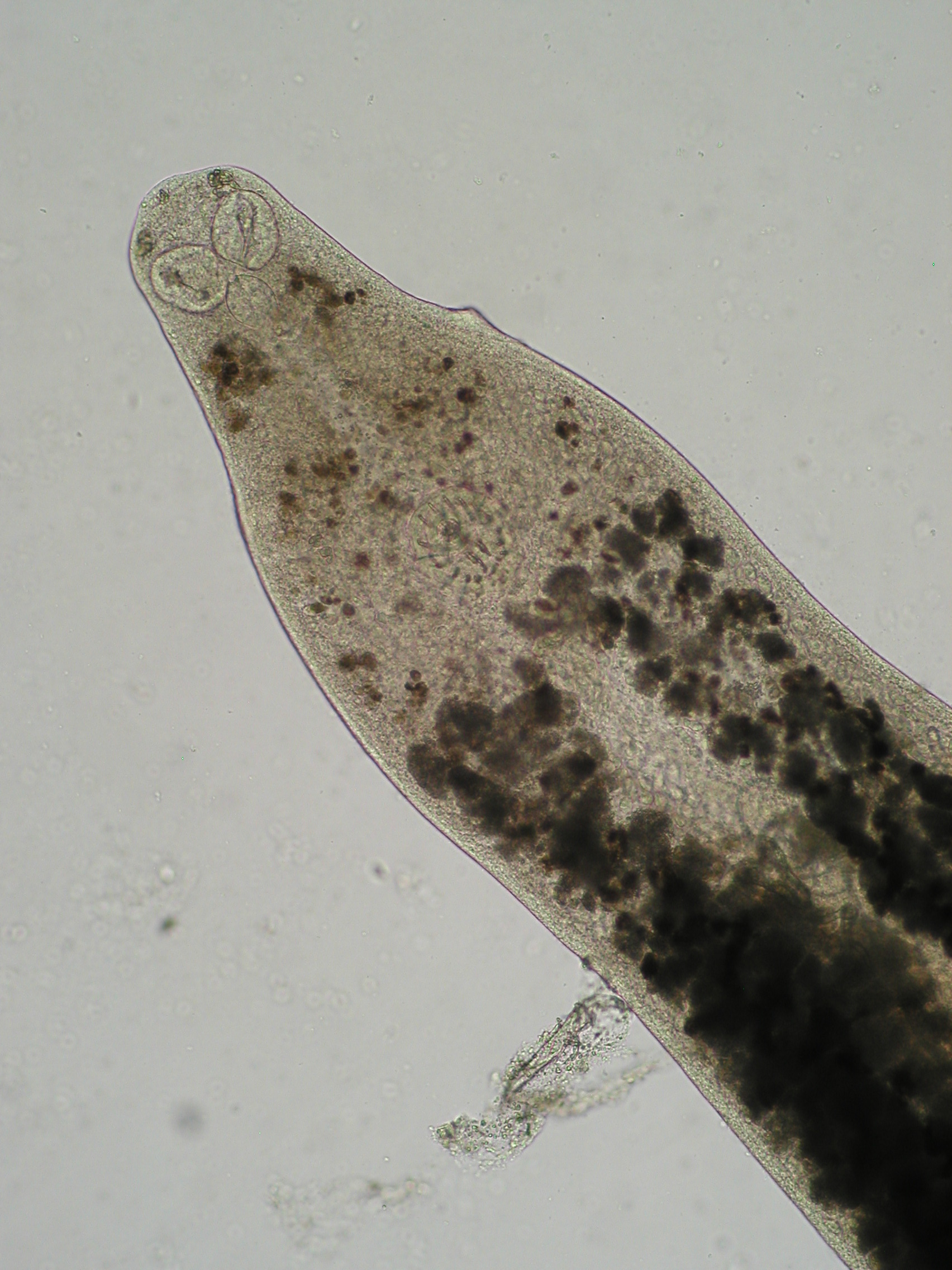
Figure 3: Anterior end (prohaptor) of the adult monogenean Sparicotyle chrysophrii viewed by microscopy.

== Treatments ==
Currently, only formalin baths are regulated in some European countries. 30 min bath in formalin (300 ppm) is 100% effective for eggs, oncomiracidia and adults in in vitro treatments, and hydrogen peroxide (200 ppm) is 100% effective for oncomiracidia and adults.

== Other control strategies ==
Recommend synchronization of fish baths with net changing to lower the possibility of infection or re-infection. Regular parasite counts from gills are recommended to decide bath treatments and avoid sudden outbreaks.

== Research ==
Different aspects of monogenean biology, ecology and pathology have been investigated through the EU funded Horizon2020 Project ParaFishControl, adding greatly to the generation of new fundamental and applicable knowledge. The genome and transcriptome of S. chrysophrii different developmental stages has been sequenced; the gilt-head seabream response to chronic and mild infection by S. chrysophrii has been evaluated using RNA-seq, as well standard histology and immunohistochemistry techniques; an array of synthetic compounds and herbal extracts has been tested to infer toxicity on the adult monogenean; assessment of the transfer of the monogenean between wild and farmed fish has been done using ddRAD-seq; different techniques of in vitro culture have been successfully applied.

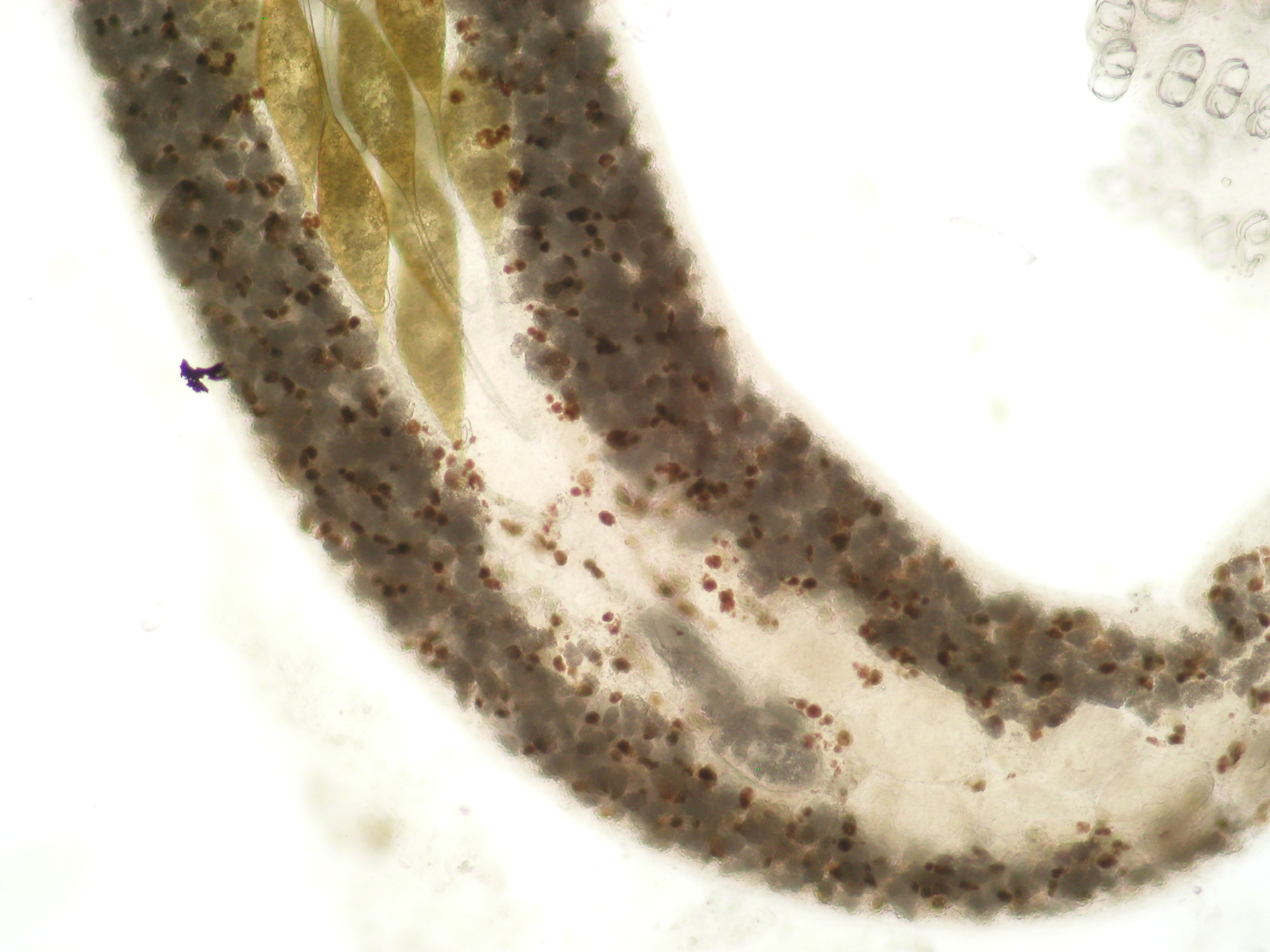
Figure 4: Mid-posterior end of the adult monogenean Sparicotyle chrysophrii viewed by microscopy, showing clumps of eggs within the uterus, dark-brown vitellaria gland laterally and a part of the opisthaptor (upper right corner).

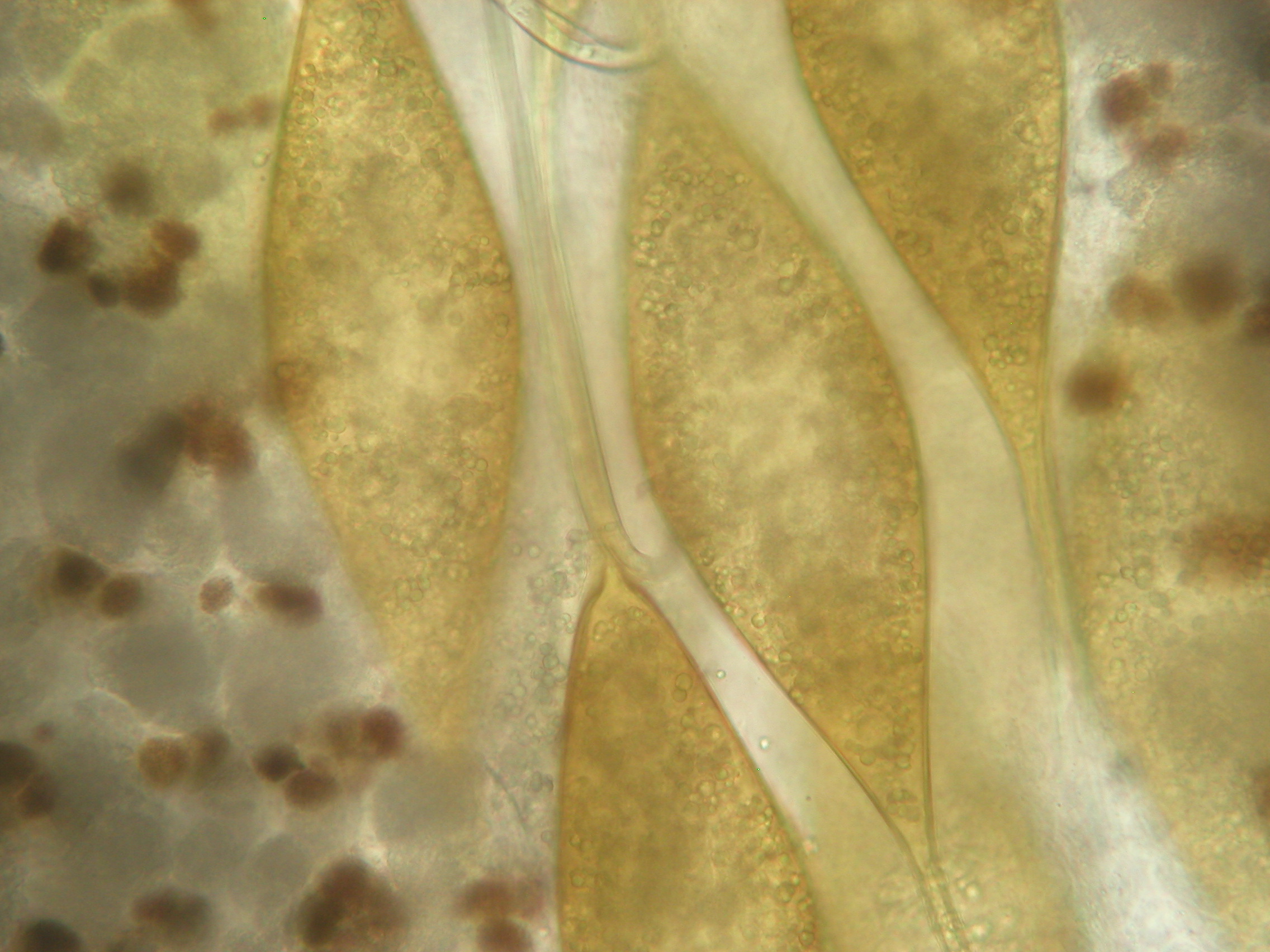
Figure 5: Eggs of the adult monogenean Sparicotyle chrysophrii viewed by microscopy, within parasite uterus.
