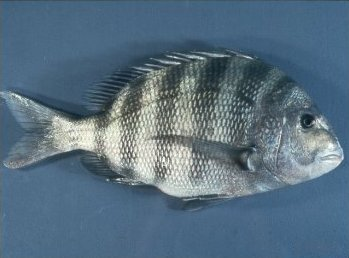

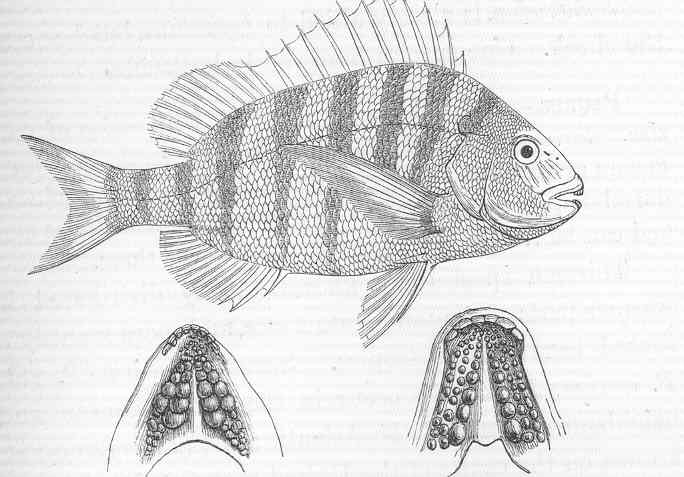

Conservation status
- Least Concern (IUCN 3.1)

Scientific classification
- Kingdom: Animalia
- Phylum: Chordata
- Class: Actinopterygii
- Division: Teleostei
- Order: Acanthuriformes
- Family: Sparidae
- Genus: Archosargus
- Species: A. probatocephalus

Binomial name
- Archosargus probatocephalus (Walbaum, 1792)

Synonyms
- Sparus probatocephalus Walbaum, 1792; Sparus ovicephalus Bloch & Schneider, 1801; Perca leonina Gronow, 1854; Archosargus oviceps Ginsburg, 1952; Sparus ovis Mitchill, 1815; Sparus ovicephalus var. poki Bloch & Schneider, 1801; Sparus ovicephalus var. porgee Bloch & Schneider, 1801; Sparus porgee Walbaum, (ex Schöpf) 1792; Sparus porgy Lacépède, 1802

= Archosargus probatocephalus =

Species of fish

Archosargus probatocephalus, the sheepshead, sheepshead seabream or convict fish, is a species of marine ray-finned fish belonging to the family Sparidae, the seabreams and porgies. This species is found in the Western Atlantic Ocean. The sheepshead is an important species to recreational and commercial fisheries.

== Taxonomy ==
Archosargus probatocephalus was first formally described as Sparus probatocephalus by the German physician, naturalist and taxonomist Johann Julius Walbaum with no type locality given, although it is thought to be New York. The Southern sheepshead (A. aries) is regarded as a separate valid species by some authorities, but is not recognised as such by FishBase. The genus Archosargus is placed in the family Sparidae within the order Spariformes by the 5th edition of Fishes of the World. Some authorities classify this genus in the subfamily Sparinae, but the 5th edition of Fishes of the World does not recognise subfamilies within the Sparidae.

== Etymology ==
Archosargus probatocephalus has a specific name which compounds probaton, meaning "sheep", with cephalus. This means "head", reflecting its common name, sheepshead, which it was probably given because of some sheep-like features, such as having large teeth protruding from an open mouth.

== Description ==
Archosargus probatocephalus has an oval shaped, deep, laterally compressed body with a small blunt head, the dorsal and ventral profiles of the head being convex. It has moderately sized eyes, a small horizontal mouth and the preorbital bone overlaps the rear of the maxilla. The teeth at the front of the jaw are broad and flattened, the upper jaw has three rows of molar-like teeth at the sides and the lower jaw has two. The margin of the preoperculum is smooth, with no serrations or spines. The dorsal fin is long and not high and is supported by 12 spines, the front spine points towards the front and may be embedded, and 11 soft rays. The anal fin contains three spines, the second spine being very robust, and 9 or 10 soft rays. The pectoral fin is long, clearly greater in length than the pelvic fins, extending to the level of the middle spine of the anal fin. The caudal fin is forked. The adults are silvery to greenish-yellow with olive on the upper body. Along the flanks there are five or six dark vertical bars, which fade with age. The caudal and pectoral fins are greenish in colour while the dorsal, anal, and pelvic fins are dark. The sheepshead reaches a maximum published total length of 91 cm (36 in), although 35 cm (14 in) is more typical.

== Distribution and habitat ==
Archosargus probatocephalus is found in the Western Atlantic Ocean where it ranges from Nova Scotia to Rio Grande do Sul in Brazil, including the Gulf of Mexico and the Caribbean Sea. It mainly occurs in coastal waters in the vicinity of rock pilings, jetties, mangrove roots, and piers, also in tidal creeks. It is euryhaline and shows a preference for brackish waters. It looks for warmer spots around springs and discharges of rivers and will occasionally enter freshwater in the winter.

== Biology ==
Archosargus probatocephalus is an omnivore: the larger juveniles and adults are predators of blue crabs (Callinectes sapidus), other crustaceans, shellfish and small fish such as juvenile Atlantic croakers (Micropogonias undulatus), with vegetable matter occasionally taken. The large flattened teeth are used to crush prey protected by shells or armor as well as to pry barnacles off rocks, pilings, jetties and hard reefs. Juveniles feed on zooplankton, polychaetes, and chironomid larvae.

Populations of this fish in the Atlantic waters off the southern United States spawn mainly in the early spring. However, pelagic larvae have been observed in late winter and spring in the Gulf of Mexico. Adults move further offshore to spawn, going back to coastal waters and estuaries. The juveniles are most numerous in seagrass beds and over mud substrates, and once they grow to a length of around 50 mm (2.0 in), they leave the seagrass beds and aggregate with the adults.

== Fishing ==
Archosargus probatocephalus feeds on bivalves and crustaceans, so successful baits include shrimp, sand fleas (mole crabs), clams, fiddler crabs, and mussels. Sheepshead have a habit of stealing bait, so a small hook is necessary. Locating sheepshead with a boat is not difficult: fishermen look for rocky bottoms or places with obstructions, jetties, and the pilings of bridges and piers. The average weight of a sheepshead is 1.4 to 1.8 kg (3 to 4 lb), but some individuals reach the range of 4.5 to 6.8 kg (10 to 15 lb). This species was subjected to overfishing in the past, and is again becoming more important to commercial fisheries in the Gulf of Mexico as more desirable species, such as red drum (Sciaenops ocellatus), decrease through overfishing.

== Parasites ==
As with other fish, the sheepshead has a variety of parasites. One of them is the monogenean Microcotyle archosargi, which is parasitic on its gills.

== Sheepshead Bay ==
Sheepshead Bay in Brooklyn was so named after the sheepshead found in its waters.
