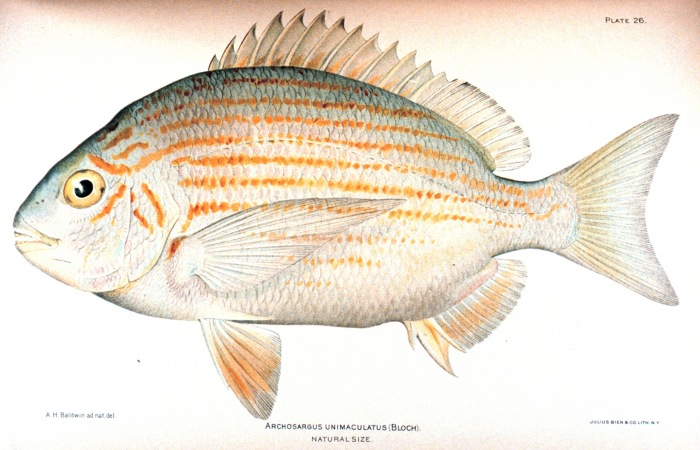

Conservation status
- Least Concern (IUCN 3.1)

Scientific classification
- Kingdom: Animalia
- Phylum: Chordata
- Class: Actinopterygii
- Order: Acanthuriformes
- Family: Sparidae
- Genus: Archosargus
- Species: A. rhomboidalis

Binomial name
- Archosargus rhomboidalis (Linnaeus, 1758)

Synonyms
- Perca rhomboidalis Linnaeus, 1758; Archosargus unimaculatus (Bloch, 1792); Perca unimaculata Bloch, 1792

= Western Atlantic seabream =

Species of fish

Western Atlantic seabream (Archosargus rhomboidalis) is an ocean-going species of fish in the family, Sparidae. It was first described in 1758 by the "father of modern taxonomy," Carl Linnaeus, in the 10th edition of his book, Systema Naturae. Within their native range, Western Atlantic seabream are also known as the seabream, brim, tropical sheepshead, chopa amarilla, or salema. Although they are eaten, and have been described as pan fish, Western Atlantic seabream have not gained the popularity as a gamefish that their relative, the sheepshead (A. probatocephalus) has.

== Taxonomy and naming ==
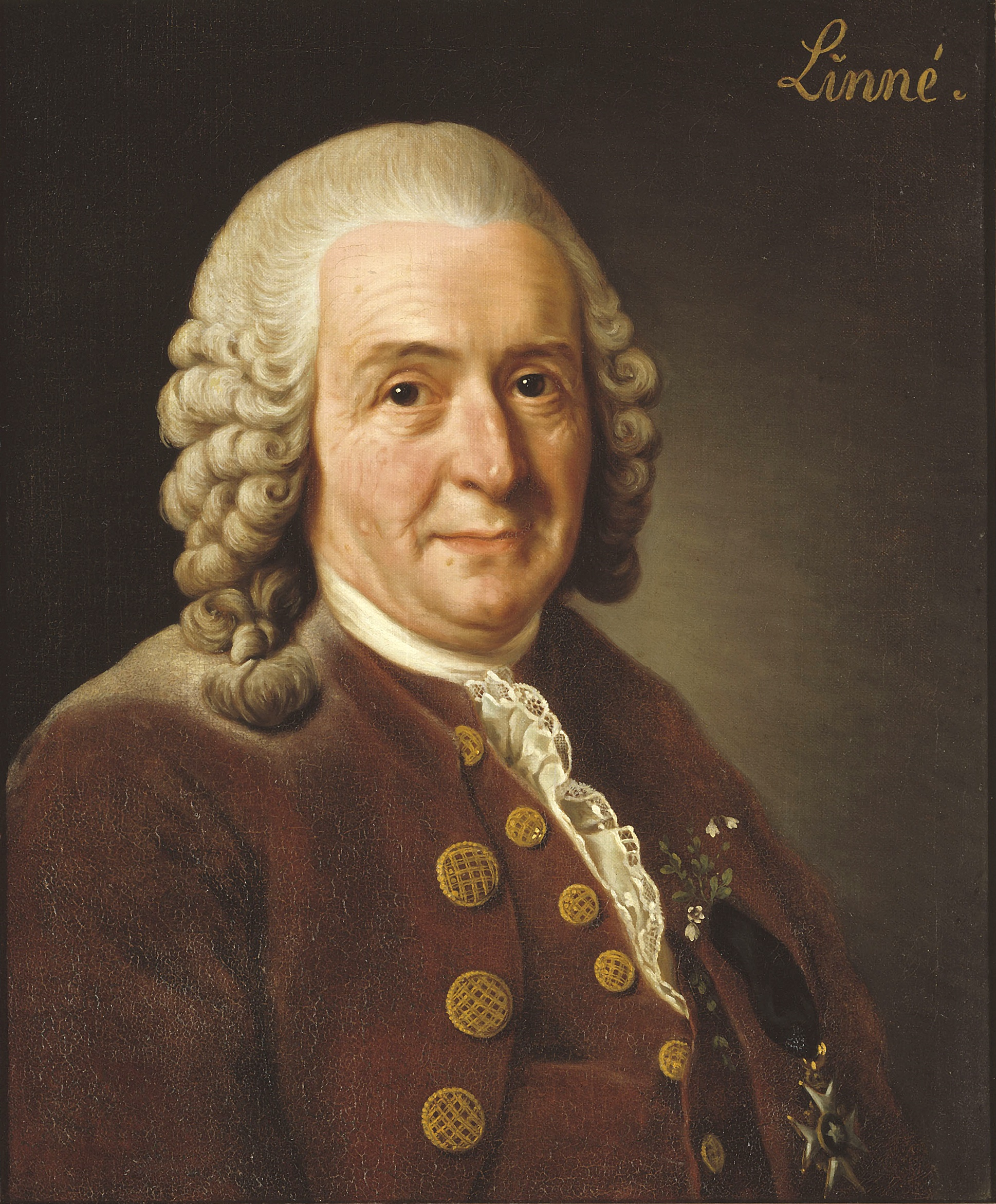
Carolus Linnaeus

Carl Linnaeus described the Western Atlantic seabream in the 1758 edition of Systema Naturae. It was originally placed in Perca, a genus currently containing three species of freshwater fishes, such as the yellow perch and European perch. It was later moved to the genus Archosargus. The German naturalist Marcus Elieser Bloch described this species in his work, Allgemeine Naturgeschichte der Fische (General Natural History of Fishes), under the name Archosargus unimaculatus in 1792, which is now considered an "ambiguous synonym".

== Description ==
The Western Atlantic seabream is similar to other members of its genus, such as the sheepshead. They differ in that they are smaller, have several horizontal blue streaks, mixed with gold or yellow, and a dark spot at the shoulder. It does have vertical crossbars, like the Sheepshead, but they disappear with age.

The maximum published length of a Western Atlantic seabream is 33 centimetres (13 in), though they usually grow to about 20 centimetres (7.9 in). The heaviest was recorded to weigh 0.55 kilograms (1.2 lb). Western Atlantic seabream have nine spines on their dorsal fins, and 10–11 soft rays. On their anal fins, they have only three spines, but the same number of rays. The large intestine of the Western Atlantic seabream makes up roughly 90% of the length of its entire digestive tract. Males and females can be distinguished by the color of their pelvic fins: in males, the fin is partially or totally dark, while in females it is an orange color.

== Distribution and habitat ==
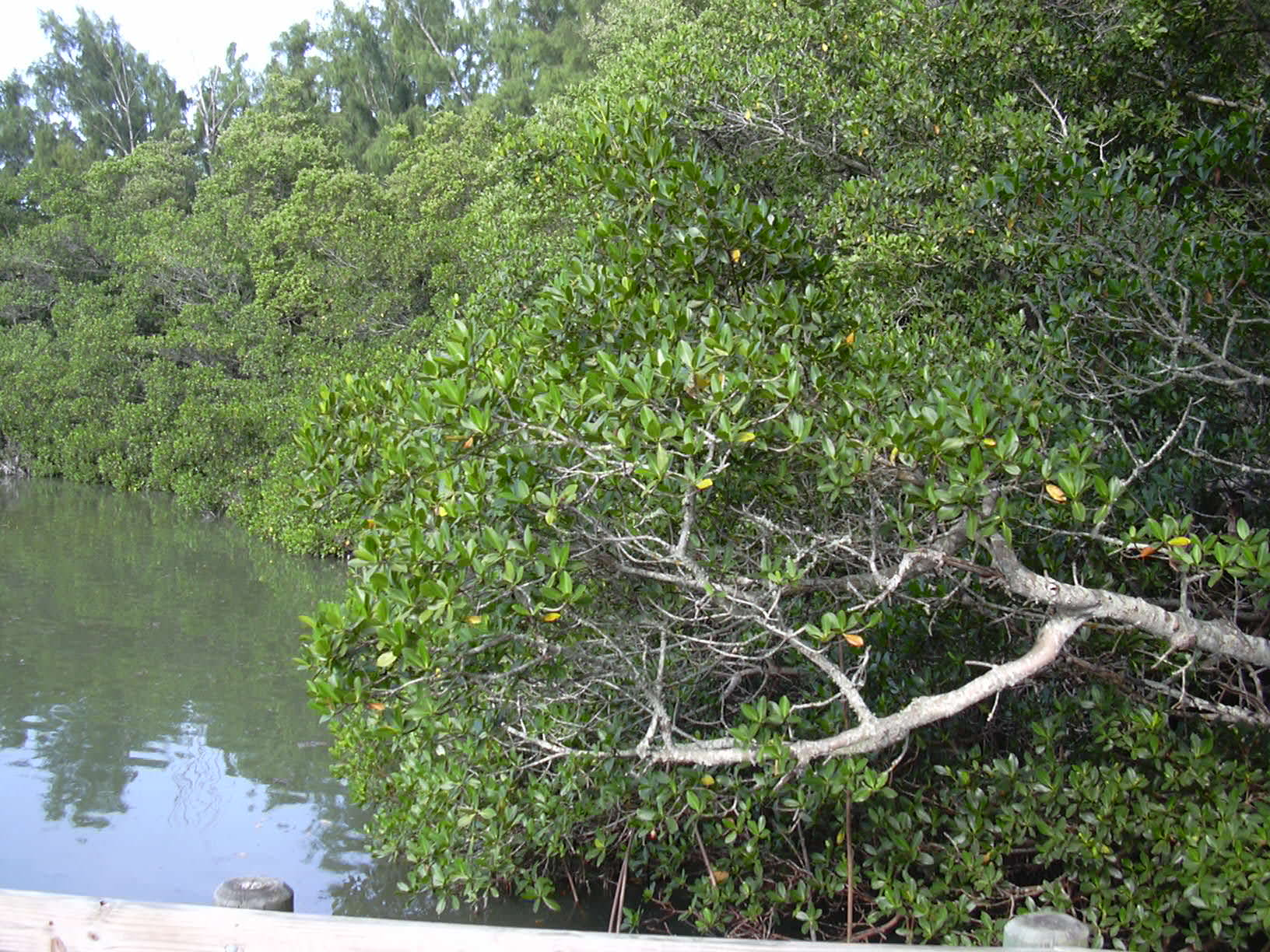
Mangrove swamps, such as these in Florida, provide excellent habitat for the Western Atlantic seabream.

Western Atlantic seabream are known from waters off New Jersey and the northern Gulf of Mexico, south to Argentina. Oddly, they are not found near the Bahamas, though they are known from many other parts of the West Indies.

They are commonly found in mangrove swamps, and in muddy, or vegetated bottoms. They are occasionally found in brackish water, and over reefs near mangroves. Western Atlantic seabream feed mainly on small, benthic invertebrates, such as bivalves, crustaceans and aquatic plants and can live up to two years in the wild.
