= Margarita Bravo Hollis =

Mexican helminthologist

- Born: 10 June 1911; Mixcoac, Mexican Federal District, Mexico
- Died: 13 December 2011 (aged 100); Mexico City, Mexico
- Occupation: Parasitologist
- Relatives: Helia Bravo Hollis (sister)
- Awards: Guggenheim Fellowship (1955)

Academic background
- Education: National Autonomous University of Mexico

Academic work
- Discipline: Helminthology
- Sub-discipline: Monogenea
- Institutions: National Autonomous University of Mexico

Margarita Bravo Hollis (10 June 1911 – 13 December 2011) was a Mexican parasitologist. A 1955 Guggenheim Fellow and expert in helminthology, she worked at the National Autonomous University of Mexico (UNAM) as a researcher and educator, and she managed UNAM's helminthological research as curator of the Helminthological Collection of the Institute of Biology and co-developer of the Helminthology Laboratory.

== Biography ==
Margarita Bravo Hollis was born on 10 June 1911 in Mixcoac, then part of the Mexican Federal District separate from Mexico City. Her sister was botanist Helia Bravo Hollis. She joined the National Autonomous University of Mexico's Institute of Biology in the 1930s, (Note: Sources vary on the date she joined; while Lamothe-Argumedo says 1932, the Reports of the Secretary and Treasurer says 1931.) where she began a career as a research assistant and later became a senior researcher. She was then promoted to professor in 1947, before getting her master's degree in science from UNAM in 1949. In 1955, she was awarded a Guggenheim Fellowship for "studies of the trematode parasites of fishes"; she worked under Harold W. Manter at the University of Nebraska.

Returning to UNAM, she served as curator of the Institute of Biology's Helminthological Collection from 1960 to 1980, publishing a catalogue for them in 1973. She was awarded the UNAM's 1981 Medal of University Merit for her five decades of work. She also taught invertebrate zoology and laboratory techniques at the UNAM Faculty of Science. Having published at least once every year for almost six decades, she eventually retired in 1992.

As an academic, she specialized in monogeneans, in addition to her work on other parasitic worm species. Her research resulted in 96 publications, as well as the naming of one family and 105 new species of parasitic worms, one of which - Pseudobivagina aniversaria - was named after the Institute of Biology's 50th anniversary in 1979. In 1970, she was honored with a special volume of the Annals of the Institute of Biology of the Zoology series. She also had five genera and 27 species named after her. She and her teacher Eduardo Caballero y Caballero turned UNAM's Helminthology Laboratory into "one of the most recognized research centers of this discipline in Latin America". Marcos Rafael Lamothe-Argumedo, whom she once worked with in her capacity as an academic advisor, called her "one of the pillars of helminthology in Mexico".

She died on 13 December 2011 in Mexico City; she was 100.
