= Oncomiracidium =

Larval stage of monogenean flatworms

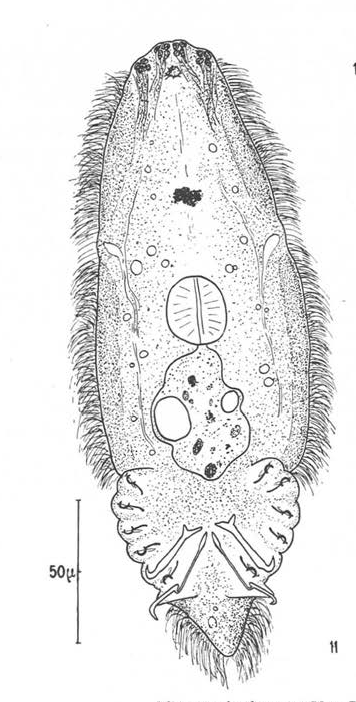
The oncomiracidium of Microcotyle donavini (Microcotylidae)

An oncomiracidium is the ciliated and free-living larva of a monogenean, a type of parasitic flatworm commonly found on fish. It is similar to the miracidium of Trematoda, but has sclerotised (hardened) hooklets not found in the latter.
