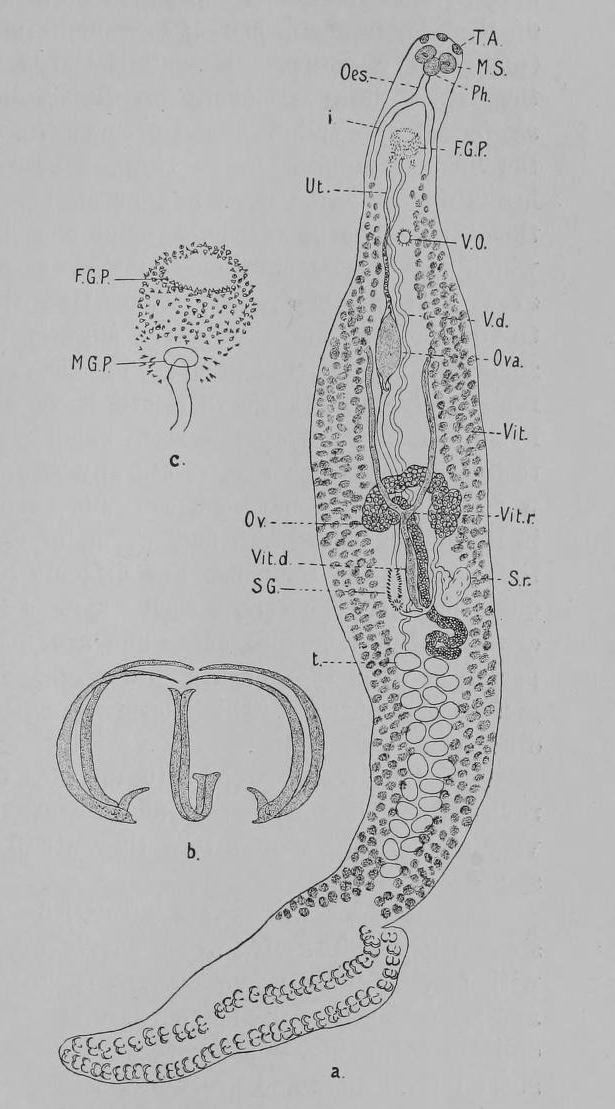
- Microcotyle pomacanthi

Scientific classification
- Kingdom: Animalia
- Phylum: Platyhelminthes
- Class: Monogenea
- Order: Mazocraeidea
- Family: Microcotylidae; Taschenberg, 1879

Subfamilies
- See text

= Microcotylidae =

Family of worms

Microcotylidae is a family of polyopisthocotylean monogeneans. All the species in this family are parasitic on fish.

== Subfamilies ==
According to the World Register of Marine Species, as of December 2018 the family includes 7 subfamilies:

- Anchoromicrocotylinae Bravo-Hollis, 1981
- Atriasterinae Maillard & Noisy, 1979 including Sparicotyle chrysophrii
- Metamicrocotylinae Yamaguti, 1963
- Microcotylinae Taschenberg, 1879 including Microcotyle with many species.
- Prosomicrocotylinae Yamaguti, 1963
- Prostatomicrocotylinae Yamaguti, 1968
- Syncoelicotylinae Mamaev & Zubchenko, 1978
