= Silver biddy =

Silver biddies (singular: silver biddy), also spelled silver-biddies, is a name used to refer to some bony fishes belonging to the family Gerreidae in the order Perciformes. They are also known as jerki (Sin) or mudro (Bal). Silver biddies are known as blanches in French and mojarras in Spanish.

Fishes in the family Gerreidae that include "silver biddy" in their common names include:

- Gerres equulus, Japanese silver-biddy
- Gerres filamentosus or Gerres filamentosis (Cuvier, 1829), also known as Gerres punctatus (Cuvier, 1830), Pertica filamentosa (Munro, 1955) and Gerres macracanthus (Bleeker, 1854). G. filamentosus is known as whipfin silver biddy or long-rayed silver biddy in English, as blanche fil in French and as mojarra del hebra in Spanish.
- Gerres methueni, striped silver biddy
- Gerres oyena (Forsskål, 1775), also known as lined silver biddy and common silver biddy in English, as blanche commune in French and as mojarra común in Spanish.
- Gerres poieti (Cuvier, 1829), also known as strongspine silver biddy in English, blanche armée in French and mojarra espinuda in Spanish.
- Gerres setifer, small Bengal silver-biddy
- Gerres subfasciatus
- Pentaprion longimanus (Cantor, 1850), also known as longfin silver-biddy in English, as blanche à pagaies in French and mojarra alona in Spanish.
- Parequula melbournensis or Melbourne silver biddy, a species similar to G. subfasciatus

== See also ==
- Lutjanidae
