= Microcotyle guanabarensis =

Scientific classification
- Kingdom: Animalia
- Phylum: Platyhelminthes
- Class: Monogenea
- Order: Mazocraeidea
- Family: Microcotylidae
- Genus: Microcotyle
- Species: M. guanabarensis

Binomial name
- Microcotyle guanabarensis Bravo-Hollis & Kohn, 1990

Species of worms

Microcotyle guanabarensis a species of monogenean, parasitic on the gills of a marine fish. It belongs to the family Microcotylidae.

== Systematics ==
Microcotyle guanabarensis was first described by Bravo-Hollis and Kohn in 1990 from the gills of Eucinostomus argenteus (Gerreidae) off Brazil.

== Morphology ==
Microcotyle guanabarensis has the general morphology of all species of Microcotyle, with a symmetrical body, comprising an anterior part which contains most organs and a posterior part called the haptor. The haptor is symmetrical, and bears numerous clamps, arranged as two rows, one on each side. The clamps of the haptor attach the animal to the gill of the fish.

There are also two buccal suckers at the anterior extremity. The digestive organs include an anterior, terminal mouth, a pharynx, an oesophagus and a posterior intestine with two lateral branches provided with numerous secondary branches.

Each adult contains male and female reproductive organs. The reproductive organs include an anterior genital atrium, armed with numerous very spines, a medio-dorsal vagina, a single ovary and a number of testes which are posterior to the ovary.

== Etymology ==
The specific name guanabarensis is derived from the type locality, Guanabara Bay.

== Hosts and localities ==
The type-host of Microcotyle guanabarensis is Eucinostomus argenteus (Gerreidae). The type-locality is off Rio de Janeiro (Brazil). Microcotyle guanabarensis was reported again from the type-host and locality.
