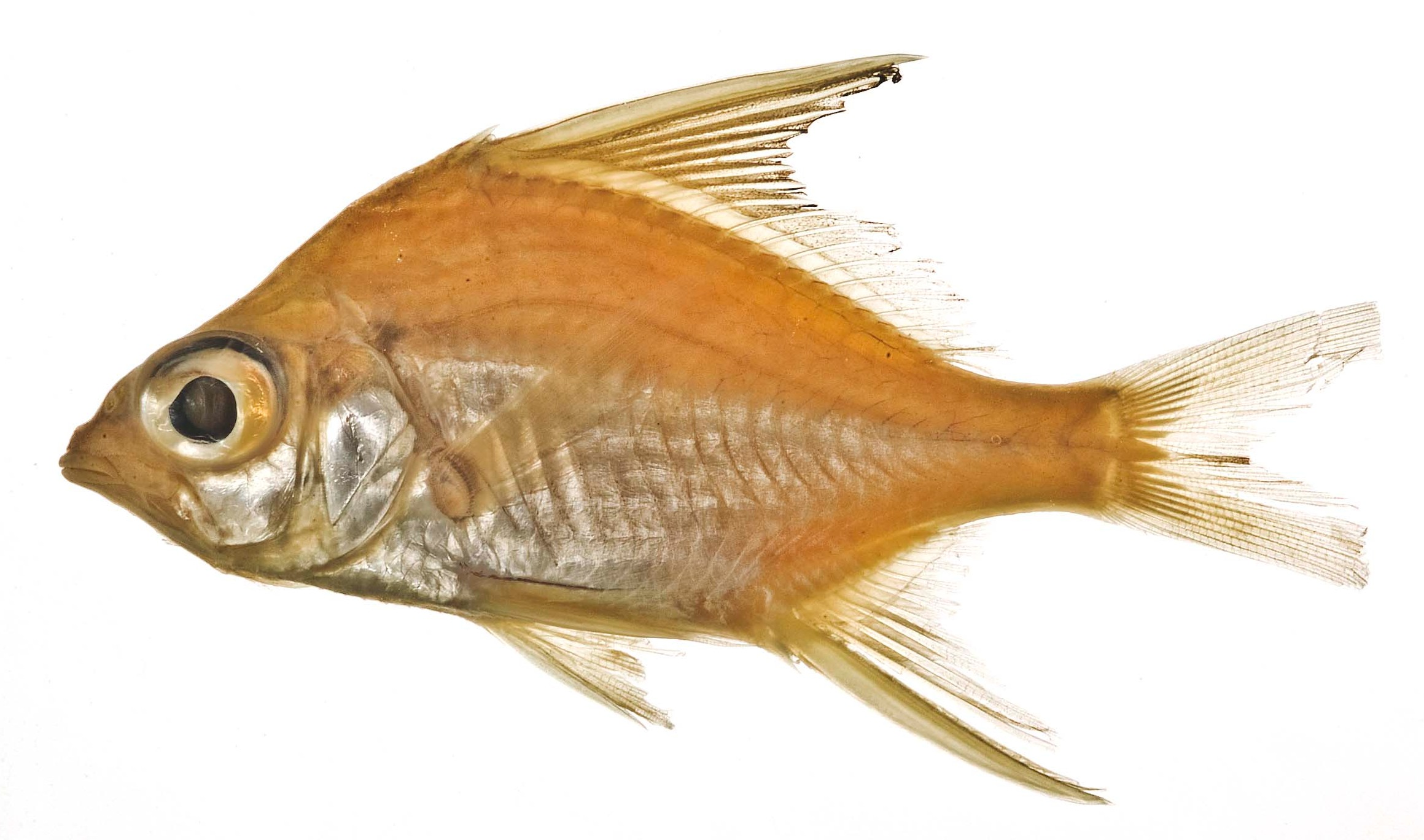

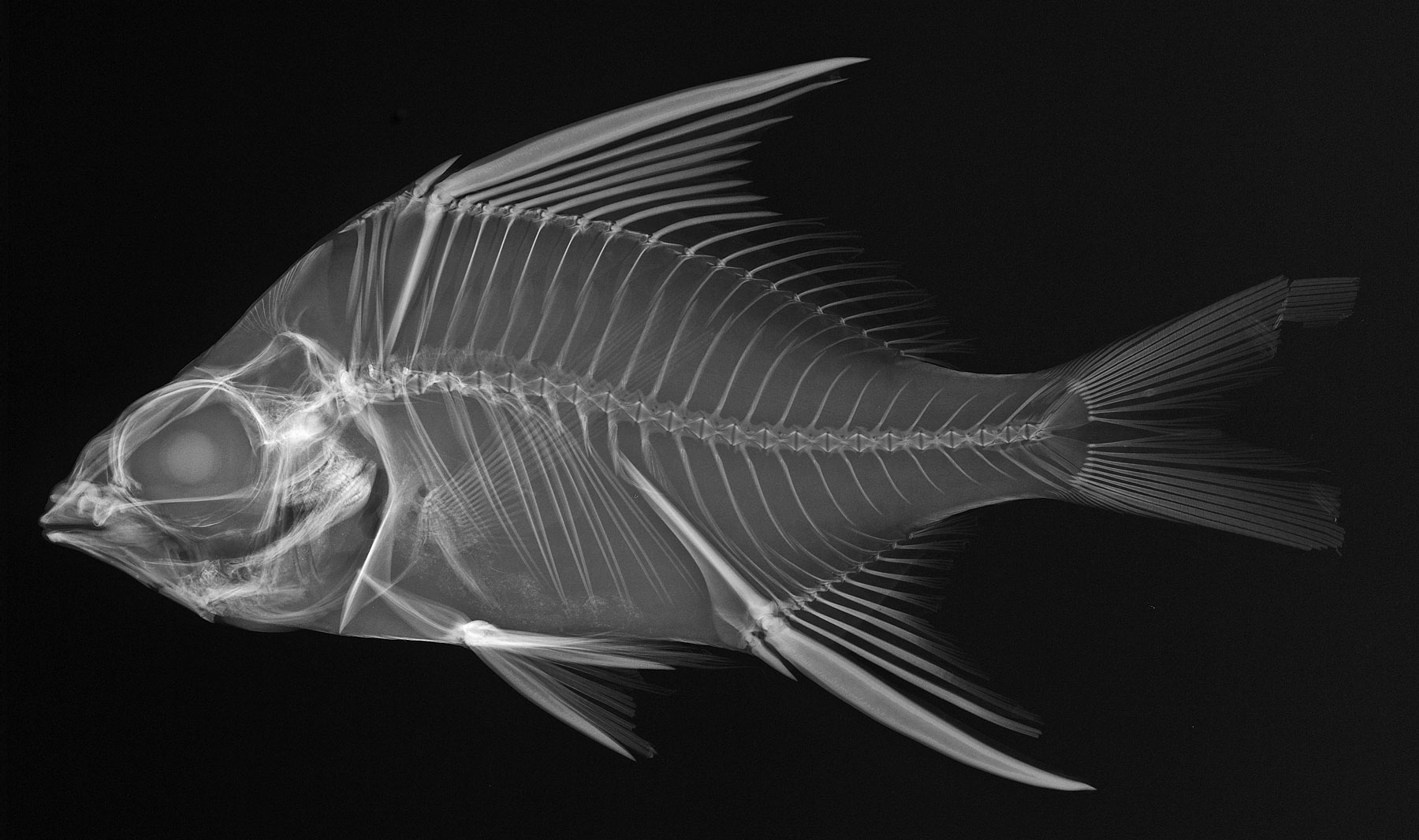
- Eugerres plumieri, conventional and X-ray images

Conservation status
- Least Concern (IUCN 3.1)

Scientific classification
- Kingdom: Animalia
- Phylum: Chordata
- Class: Actinopterygii
- Order: Acanthuriformes
- Family: Gerreidae
- Genus: Eugerres
- Species: E. plumieri

Binomial name
- Eugerres plumieri (Cuvier, 1830)
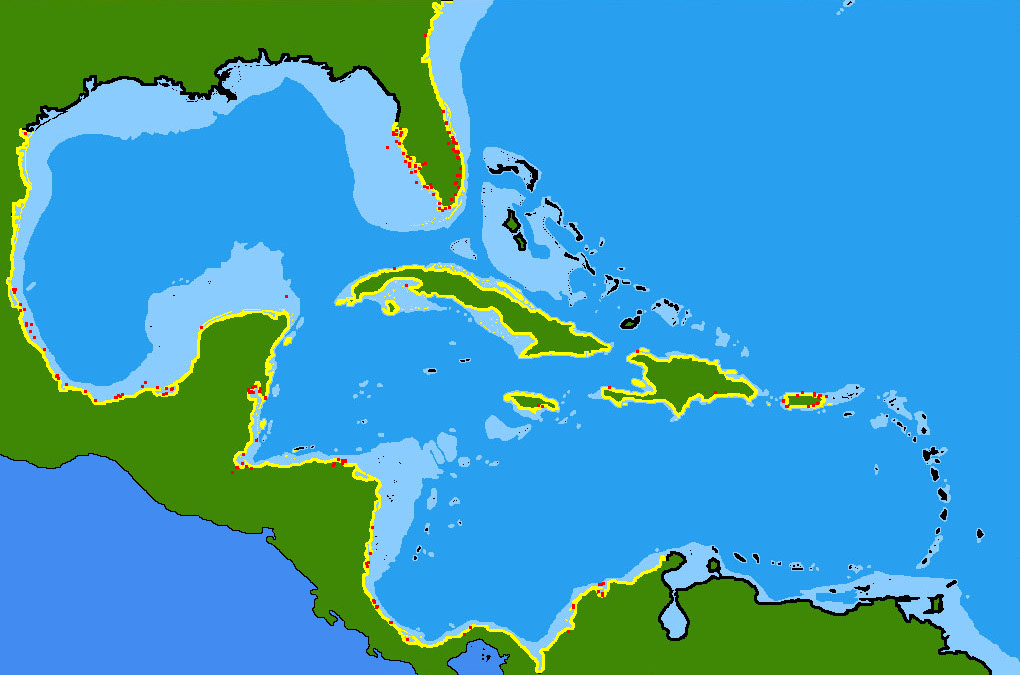

Synonyms
- Diapterus plumieri (Cuvier, 1830); Gerres embryx Jordan & Starks, 1898; Gerres plumieri Cuvier, 1830

= Eugerres plumieri =

Species of ray-finned fish

Eugerres plumieri, commonly referred to as the striped mojarra or mojarra rayada, is a demersal fish from the Gerreidae family. The family Gerreidae is nicknamed the silverbodies because many of the species, this species included, have a silver-sheen to their bodies. This fish is often confused with other species from the Gerreidae family such as the Irish mojarra. It has been grouped in the order Perciformes due to its resembles of perch-like fishes. This species was discovered by French naturalist and zoologist, Georges Cuvier. It can be found in most areas of the Western Atlantic, excluding the Bahamas and West Indies.

== Geographic distribution and ecology ==
The striped mojarra is a euryhaline organism, meaning it can tolerate a range of salinity. This allows it to inhabit coastal waters, mangrove creeks, and lagoons. It can be found off the south coast of the United States, from South Carolina down to western Florida, and from the Gulf of Mexico down to Brazil. This fish can be found near the bottom of the water, where they feed on benthic invertebrates. It is more common to find these fish in brackish waters. During the dry season (January and February) these fish can be found aggregating in rivers and canal outlets, where food and refuge are easier for them to find. During the wet season (September through November) these fish are commonly found aggregating closer to the Caribbean Sea.

== Species description ==
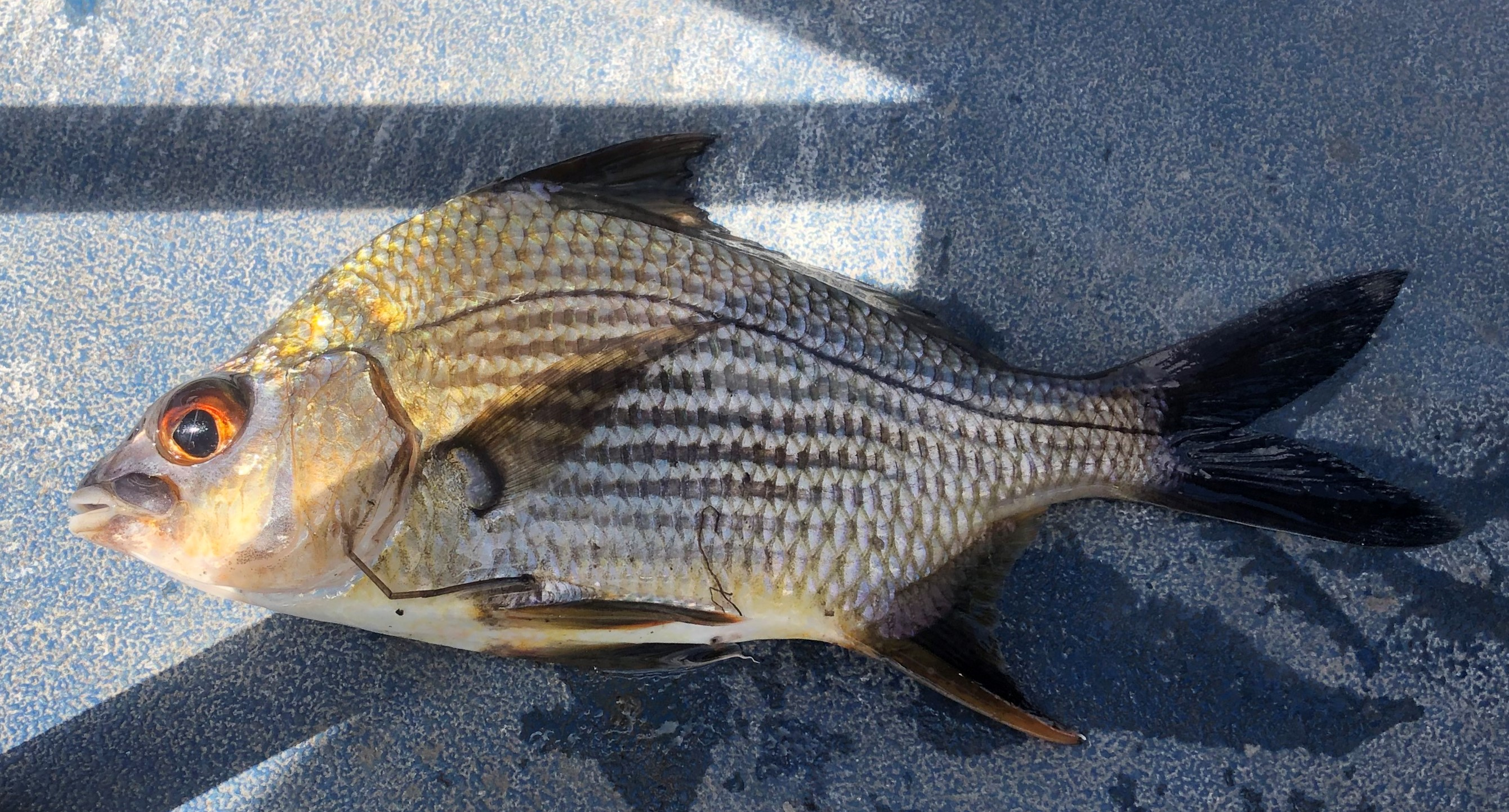

Eugerres plumieri has a compressed rhombus-like body. This shape allows it to navigate its geographical locations with efficiency. It is dark olive in color with a light yellow underbelly. The fish has a silver-like sheen covering it and has dark stripes in the center of each scale. It has a dark grey, forked dorsal fin that is typically composed of nine spines and ten rays. The anal fin is a light yellow-brown color and composed of three spines and eight rays. The pelvic and pectoral fins are a similar color to their body. The lateral line runs continuously from its gills to its caudal fin and is noticeable because of its dark color. It has 32 to 38 scales along the lateral line. The minimum length recorded of the fish is around 4.8 centimetres (1.9 in) and the maximum length is 28 cm (11 in). They have a weight range of 1.5–279.5 grams (0.053–9.859 oz). It has a pointed mouth and a protrusible jaw that makes it appear as if it has a mouth inside of a mouth. Its teeth appear to be non-existent, however it has small brush-like teeth with molar-like teeth towards the back of the mouth that is used to crush through the shells of the benthic invertebrates it feeds on.

== Reproduction ==
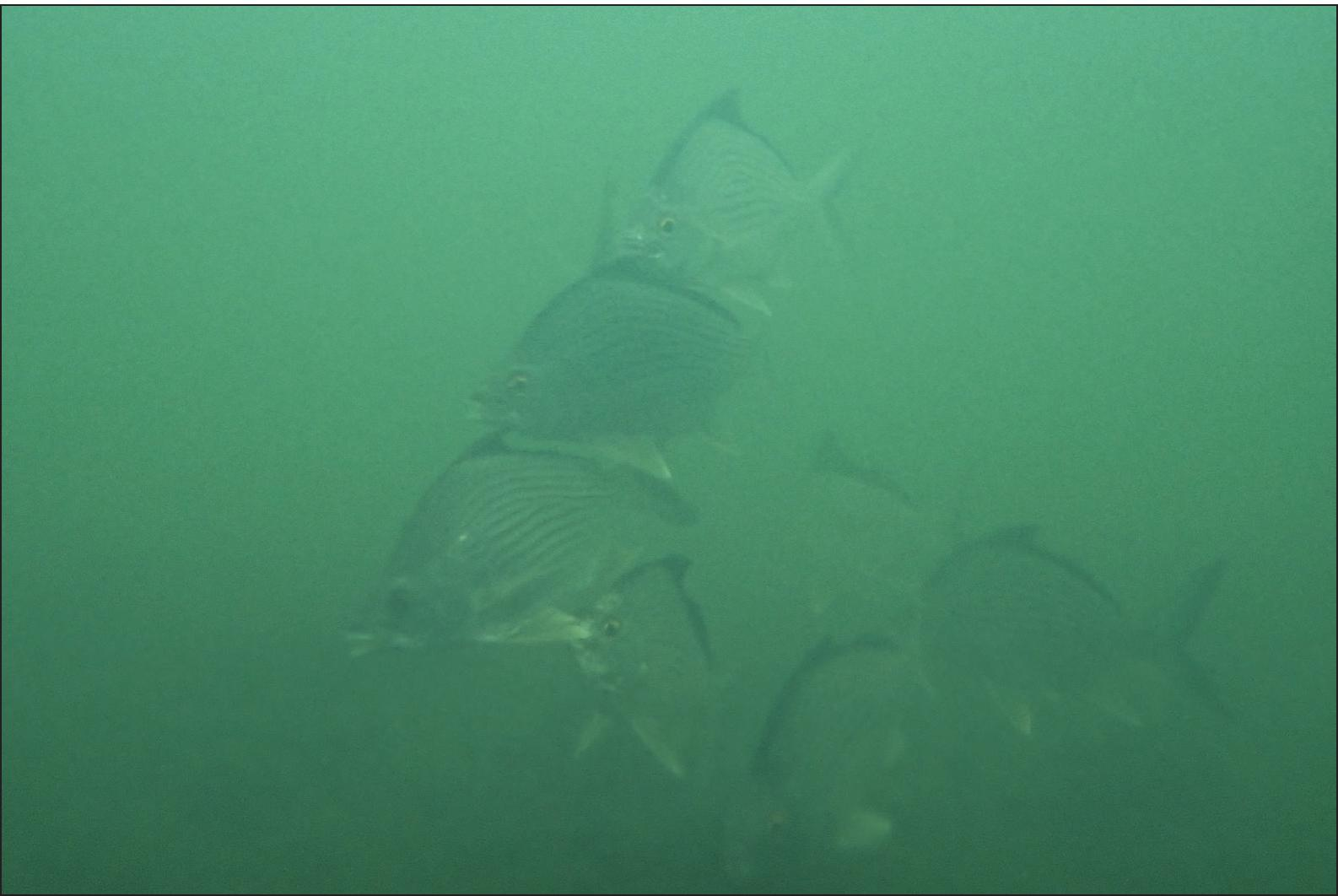
Eugerres plumieri reproduction

Striped mojarra are oviparous reproducers. This means that the females lay eggs while males produce seminal fluid ("milt") to fertilize the eggs. This species has high fecundity with the females producing 85,345 to 953,870 eggs. Striped mojarra are annual spawners, meaning they have a set season for reproduction. Its spawning season is from May until July and it partakes in a partial spawn during the rainy season of the Western Atlantic, from September through November. These fish reach sexual maturity when they are around 20 centimetres (7.9 in) in length, with peak maturity being observed during the dry seasons, from January to February. A 2022 study of striped mojarra suggest that the fish display sexual dimorphism during spawning season, meaning that there is a visual difference between the males and females. During spawning periods, male striped mojarras were observed to be smaller than their female counterparts. Males were also observed to have black coloration throughout their dorsal fins and posterior, while females displayed a lighter color.

== Diet ==
Striped mojarra mainly feed on benthic invertebrates and zooplankton. It is a diurnal feeder, meaning that it hunts during the day to differentiate between edible and inedible objects. Gerreid fish are known to dig for buried invertebrates in the sediment of the water. They angle their head down and bite into the sediment. They then sift through the contents of their mouth and expel the sediment through their gills. This hunting tactic leaves the species vulnerable to predation of bigger fish as it calls for them to bury their face into the sand to extract their prey, causing a lack of visibility to their surroundings.

== Conservation status ==
Striped mojarra is currently listed as of least concern in conservation, according to the International Union for Conservation of Nature (IUCN). They are widely distributed in their habitats and retain a stable population trend. There are currently no conservation measures in place for the striped mojarra, however, there have been recommendations for better population management in the Ciénaga Grande de Santa Marta (CGSM).

== Threats ==
Since striped mojarra aggregate in schools, it has been easy for anglers to catch them. This has resulted in an overexploitation of the fish in the CGSM. Recommendations to improve the estuaries surrounding Colombia are given with suggestions of inducing spawning to increase the population and biomass of these fish. A 2019 study regarding the presence of microplastics within fishes of the CSGM has shown that there is a need for greater research regarding plastic pollution in the area. This study found that 5% of the striped mojarra population within the CSGM have ingested plastic fibers and fragments. Given that the CSGM has been categorized as an important ecological site and that striped mojarra are commonly fished for economic and dietary value of the local area, more research regarding the role of plastic pollution should be conducted.

== Human importance ==
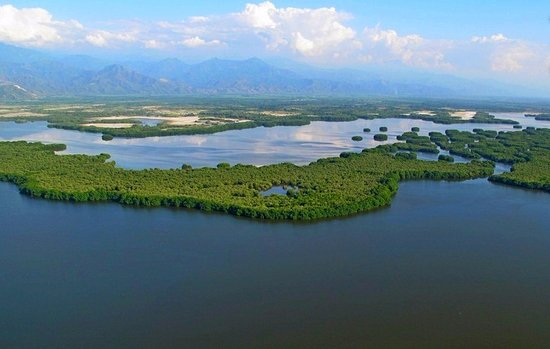
Panorama of the "Cienaga Grande de Santa Marta"

Striped mojarra are abundant in Mexico and Colombia, where it is one of the most important fishing resources. Mojarras are considered great bait for commercial fishing due to their small size. They are also caught or bred specifically for human consumption. Fried mojarra is a popular dish in Latin American countries. A large portion of the fish population in the CGSM is composed of striped mojarra. Anglers that live by the CGSM rely on this fish for economic value within their communities.
