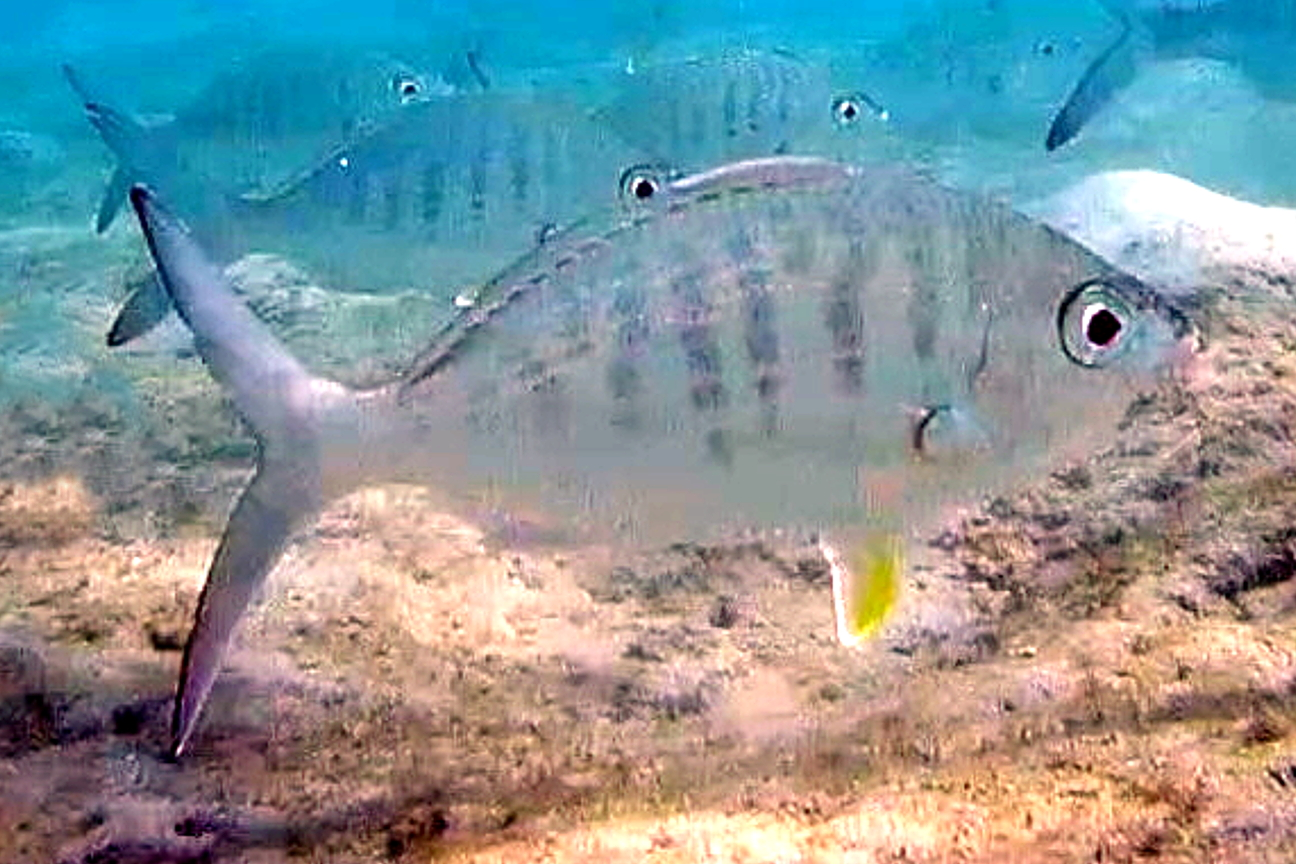

Conservation status
- Least Concern (IUCN 3.1)

Scientific classification
- Kingdom: Animalia
- Phylum: Chordata
- Class: Actinopterygii
- Division: Teleostei
- Order: Acanthuriformes
- Family: Gerreidae
- Genus: Gerres
- Species: G. cinereus

Binomial name
- Gerres cinereus (Walbaum, 1792)
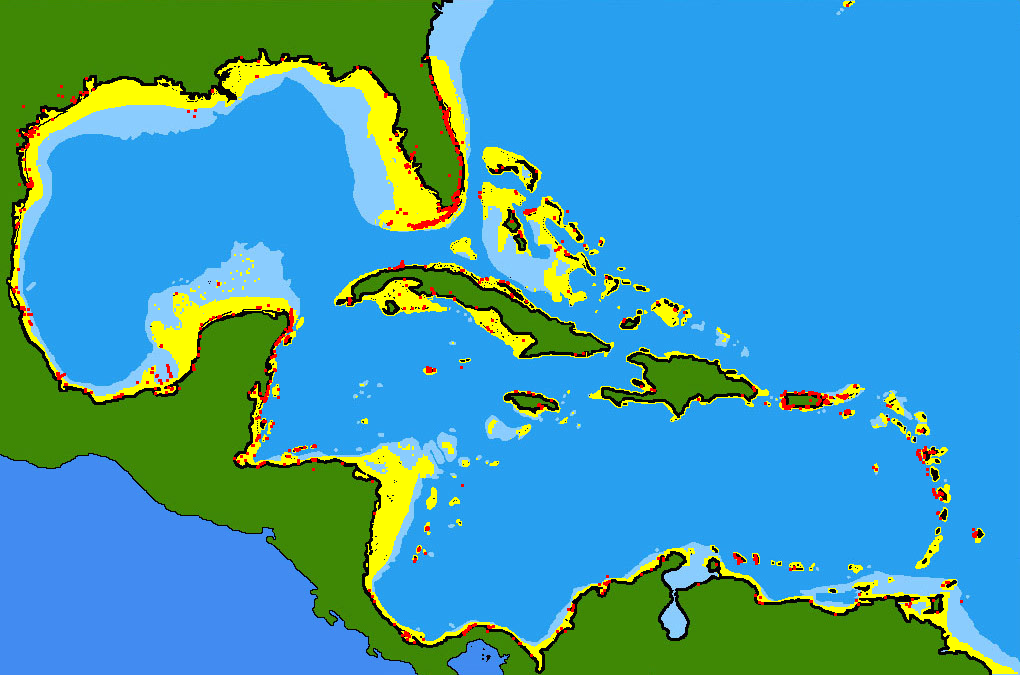

Synonyms
- Mugil cinereus Walbaum, 1792 (Basionym)

= Gerres cinereus =

Species of ray-finned fish

The yellowfin mojarra (Gerres cinereus) is a species mojarra in the family Gerreidae. The species was originally described by Johann Julius Walbaum in 1792, as part the mullet genus Mugil. They mainly inhabit salt and brackish waters, but will enter fresh water. The species displays an ability akin to gyroscopic stability, allowing it to remain in a remarkably static spatial position relative to the water flowing around it. Compared to other fish in this family, this species is listed as least concern on the IUCN red list. This species thrives in large numbers across its distribution. Their large abundance also makes them a great resource for commercial fisheries today. Although not in high demand, their distribution and availability in shallow coastal areas make them an easy target for fisheries. In Mexico, they generate approximately $9.5 million in revenue per year.

== Description ==
The family Gerreidae is a widely distributed and diverse group. The family includes over 50 different nominal species. Frequent confusion exists between the varying species in the Gerreidae family, but the Yellowfin mojarra's morphology can give insight into its distinguishing features. The body of the Yellowfin mojarra follows a compressed, slim shape with a dorsal profile that is uniformly convex. Their jaws protrude slightly and have terminal mouth structures. They are identified through their stark silver color on their body with no dark stripes along their scales. They do, however, have about 6 to 8 vertical bars on their sides. The spinous dorsal, pelvic, and caudal fins have a deep yellow or golden color, but all other fins are darker in color. Covering most of the body are the thin, overlapping ctenoid scales that contribute to their silver-like appearance. The caudal fins are deeply forked and homocercal. They have two long, continuous dorsal fins. The first dorsal fin is spiny, but forms in a rigid, short, curved shape. The second dorsal fin extends all the way to the caudal and is made up of softer rays, but is slightly larger in size compared to the first dorsal fin. Juveniles often have darker bars along their sides with light yellow tints on their fins. As they age into adulthood, these bars become lighter, and the yellow tint becomes more pronounced. These fish are gonochoristic but do not reach sexual maturity until two years of age. They breed all year round, peaking in August.

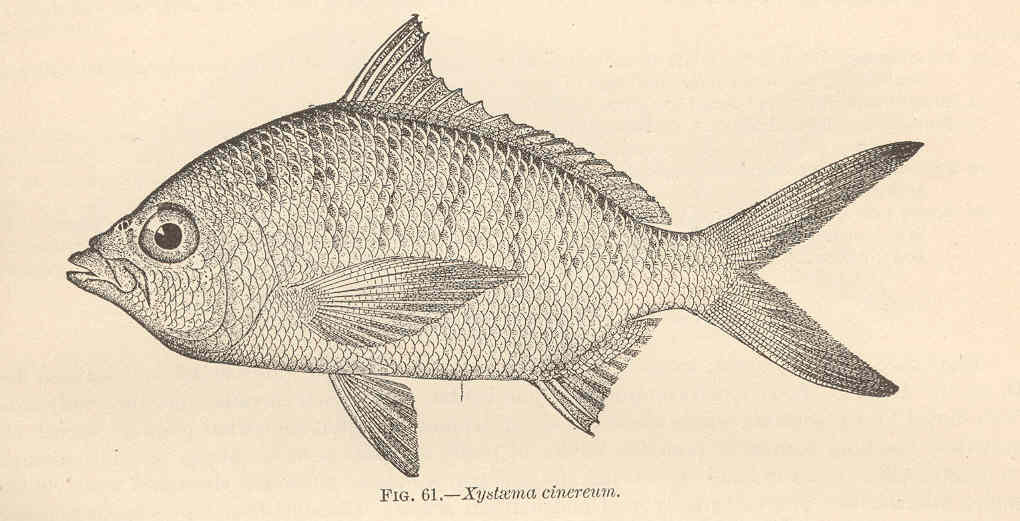
[Drawing of a Gerres Cinereus from 1902]

== Morphology and Ecology ==
The morphological features of the Mojarras' bodies make them efficient in their natural environment. Its slender and compressed body and forked tail enhances its swimming efficiency, allowing it to move quickly. This makes it easier to navigate in estuarine or shallow turbid coastal waters where mobility is more advantageous. The terminal, slightly protruding mouth aids in feeding. Worms, clams, crustaceans, and other small fish are often in their diets, although plant detritus was found to make up 74.9% of their diet on average. On top of this, their mouth protrusion allows them to push their snouts into the sand to capture invertebrates. Their terminal mouth shape allows them to hunt both in the lower to middle water column and in the benthic zone. Because of their more generalized diets, the Yellowfin Mojarra is adapted to many diverse environments. Their shiny, silvery appearance allows the Mojarra to reflect light and give off a mirror-like camouflage, protecting them from predators. This also allows them to be stealthier when it comes to hunting prey. To keep stable in fast-moving waters, the Mojarra uses its single long dorsal fin. This prevents rolling and increases maneuverability overall.

== Location and Habitat ==
Yellowfin mojarra inhabits many places along the western coasts of Southern America and parts of Northern America. Gerres cinereus distribution geologically. Specifically, variations of Yellowfin can be found around the Gulf of Mexico, the Caribbean, Rio de Janeiro, Baja California, Peru, and the Galapagos Islands. They like tropical and subtropical coastal waters but have been reported in some freshwater environments as well. The shallow waters, usually between 1 and 15 meters, are where these fish tend to roam. Sandy bottoms, coral reefs, mangrove zones, and seagrass beds are where they hunt and reside. These fish excel in shallow brackish waters that have plenty of prey and places to camouflage. Atlantic and Pacific yellowfin mojarra, although they are the same species, tend to have non-overlapping ranges. Despite this, many other species of mojarra do overlap in ranges, and as more species have evolved, distinguishing between them has become more and more difficult.

== Taxonomy ==
The Gerreidae family has long been recognized, but classifications of its species have presented many challenges, as they are all morphologically similar. The Yellowfin mojarra, described in 1792, was one of the earliest genera established for this family and was originally marveled for its "distinguishing" features. As more species were discovered, the lines between species quickly blurred. Juvenile fish in this family were especially difficult to identify, and scientists at the time often lacked the resources to identify adult mojarras. Gerres Cinereus were often mistaken for Gerres olfersi, Gerres lineatus, and Gerres brasilianus because of their similar characteristics. In 1984, Matheson and McEachran reevaluated the family as a whole and clarified distinguishing features of Gerreidae species. Today, the urohyal bone, a part of the mandibular skeleton, can be used to help distinguish the different species. The shape, size, and metrics of this critical open-closing mouth mechanism are all crucial in differentiation. Morphometric variation from urohyal bones can distinguish Gerres species with 92% accuracy. In addition to urohyal bone structures, the Yellowfin mojarra can be distinguished from other species because of its unique dorsal fin and spines. Their elongated dorsal profile and narrow caudal peduncle differ from other species, like Eugerres which have more robust bodies. They are the only members of this genus that can be separated easily using these traits. Yet, even with this information, intraspecific variation and overlapping morphologies still prove difficult when distinguishing taxonomy.

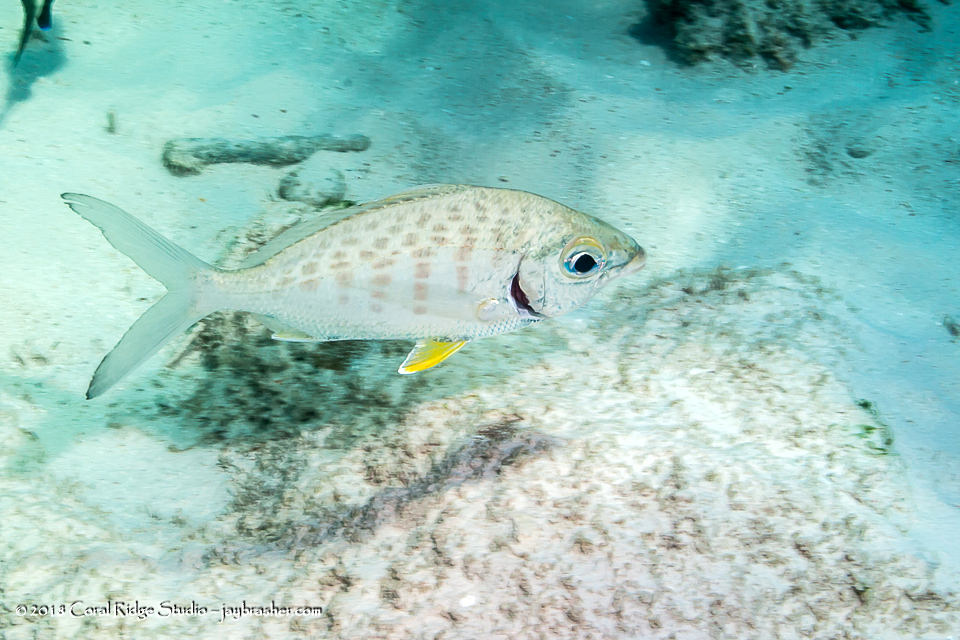
[Gerres cinereus swimming off the Florida coast.]
