= Golden mojarra =

Conservation status
- Least Concern (IUCN 3.1)

Scientific classification
- Kingdom: Animalia
- Phylum: Chordata
- Class: Actinopterygii
- Order: Acanthuriformes
- Family: Gerreidae
- Genus: Deckertichthys; Vergara-Solana, 2014
- Species: D. aureolus

Binomial name
- Deckertichthys aureolus D. S. Jordan & C. H. Gilbert, 1882

Synonyms
- Gerres aureolus D. S. Jordan & C. H. Gilbert, 1882; Diapterus aureolus (D. S. Jordan & C. H. Gilbert), 1882

Species of ray-finned fish

The golden mojarra (Deckertichthys aureolus) is a species of mojarra native to the eastern Pacific Ocean, where it is found from Costa Rica to the northern coast of Peru. This species grows to a length of 15 cm (5.9 in). This species is important to local peoples as a food fish. It is the only known member of its genus. This species was first formally described as Gerres aureolus in 1882 by David Starr Jordan (1851–1931) and Charles Henry Gilbert (1859–1928) with the type locality given as the Pacific Ocean at Bahia Matanhen, Nayart in Mexico. In 1994 it was placed in the genus Diapterus by Gerald R. Allen and D. Ross Robertson and after a review in 2014 it was placed in the monotypic genus Deckertichthys. The name of this genus honours Gary Dennis Deckert and compounds his surname with the Greek for fish, ichthys. Deckert was the first to recognise that D. aureolus was distinctive and has made a significant contribution to the study of the mojarras.
