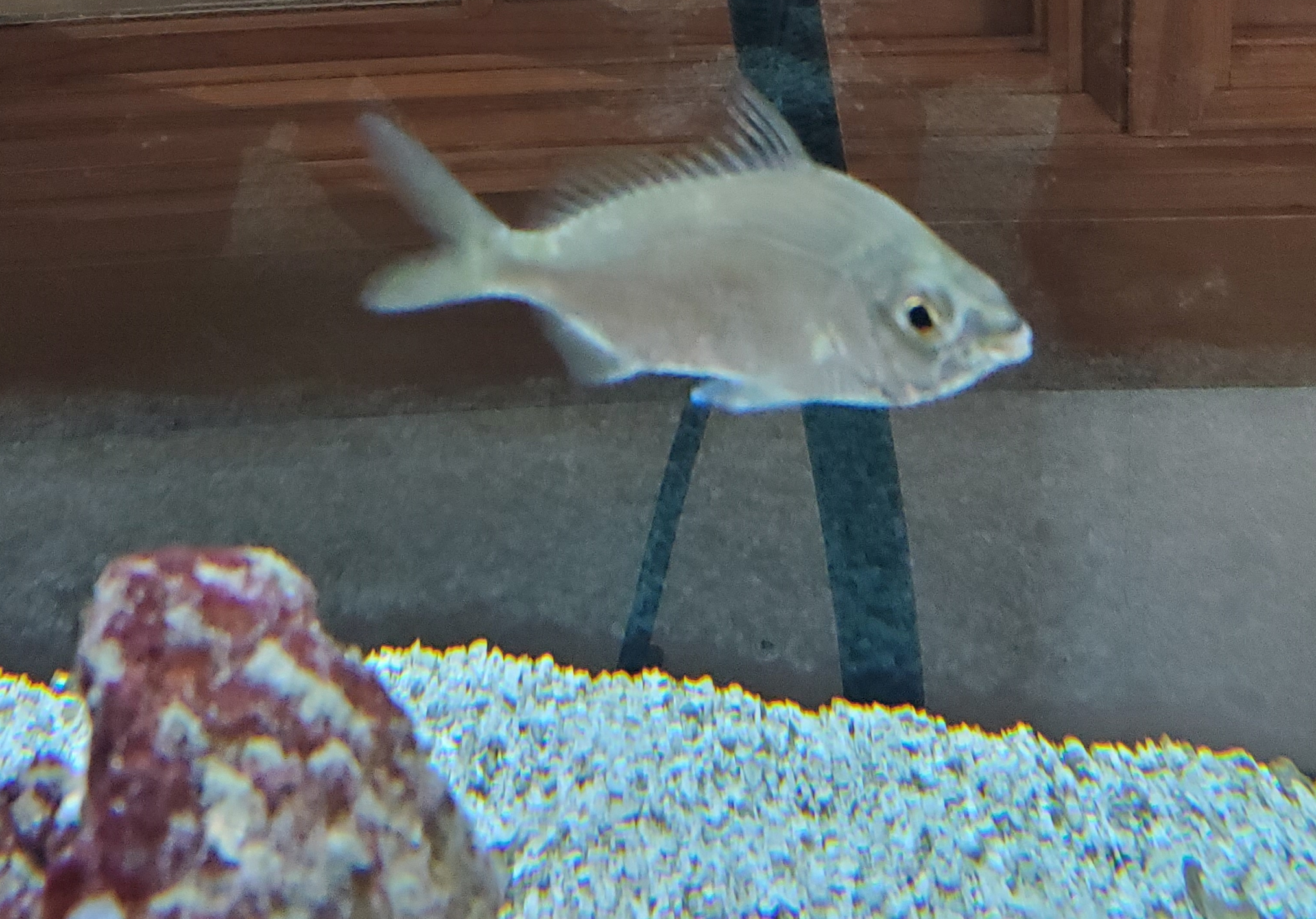
- Bigeye mojarra (Eucinostomus havana)

Conservation status
- Least Concern (IUCN 3.1)

Scientific classification
- Kingdom: Animalia
- Phylum: Chordata
- Class: Actinopterygii
- Order: Acanthuriformes
- Family: Gerreidae
- Genus: Eucinostomus
- Species: E. havana

Binomial name
- Eucinostomus havana (Nichols, 1912)

= Eucinostomus havana =

Species of ray-finned fish

Eucinostomus havana commonly known as the bigeye mojarra, is a widespread species of ray-finned fish found from South Florida and the Caribbean west to the Gulf of Mexico and as far south as the Eastern coasts of Brazil. It dwells in brackish water, favoring shallow mangroves less than 10 m (33 ft) deep. It stalks sandy grounds with vegetation and feeds on invertebrates. Mojarra are of little food value, but may be processed into fishmeal.

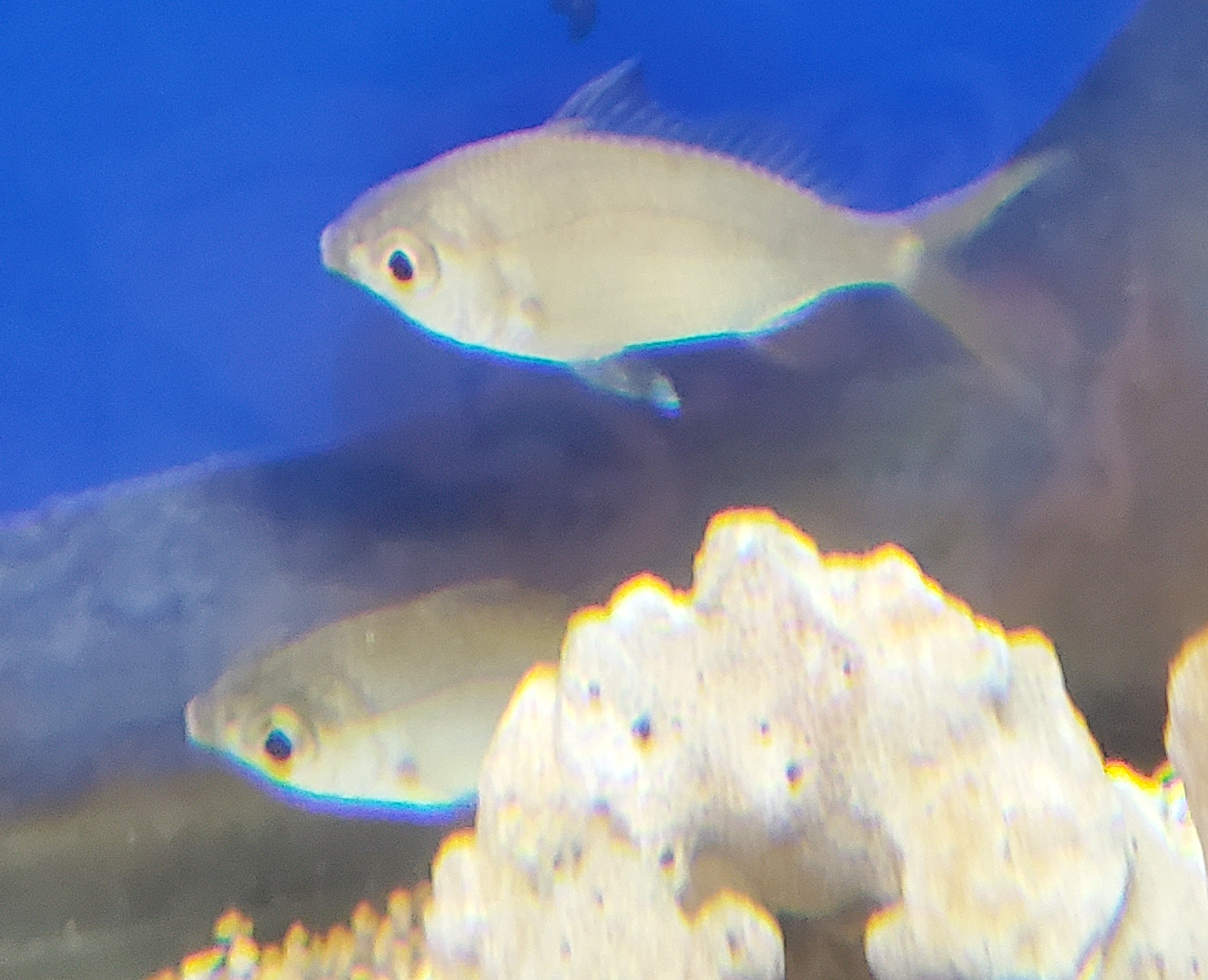
Bigeye mojarra in tank
