= Gerres nigri =

Guinean striped mojarra

Conservation status
- Least Concern (IUCN 3.1)

Scientific classification
- Kingdom: Animalia
- Phylum: Chordata
- Class: Actinopterygii
- Order: Acanthuriformes
- Family: Gerreidae
- Genus: Gerres
- Species: G. nigri

Binomial name
- Gerres nigri Günther, 1859

Synonyms
- Diapterus nigri (Günther, 1859); Gerres octactis Bleeker, 1863

Species of fish

Gerres nigri, the Guinean striped mojarra is a species of mojarra native to the eastern Atlantic Ocean. It inhabits estuaries, coastal waters and lagoons. This species can reach a maximum length of 20 cm (8 in), with 15 cm (6 in) being a more common size.

== Description ==
The Guinean striped mojarra grows to a maximum length of 20 cm (8 in) and has a compact, laterally compressed body. The snout is short, the nostrils close together and the mouth protrusible. The dorsal fin is deeply notched and has nine spines and ten soft rays, while the anal fin has three spines and eight soft rays. The pectoral fin is long, extending to beyond the origin of the anal fin. The back of the fish is olive-brown and the flanks silvery, with longitudinal dark banding. Juveniles have two longitudinal rows of black spots on the dorsal fins and some dark barring on the sides.

== Distribution and habitat ==
The Guinean striped mojarra is a coastal fish and is native to the tropical eastern Atlantic Ocean, its range extending from Senegal to northern Angola, including around the islands in the Gulf of Guinea at depths down to about 60 m (200 ft). It is a benthopelagic species forming schools and feeding near the seabed, where it favours sandy or muddy substrates. It is found in estuaries and lagoons and can tolerate a wide range of salinities, anything from 25 to 75 ppt.

== Relationship with humans ==
This fish is the subject of small scale and artisanal fisheries throughout its range. It is caught by trawling, bottom nets and line gear, and is eaten fresh or dried, seldom being made into fishmeal. It is a common fish throughout its range, and although it may be affected by overfishing, coastal development and water pollution in places, the International Union for Conservation of Nature has assessed its overall conservation status as being of "least concern".
