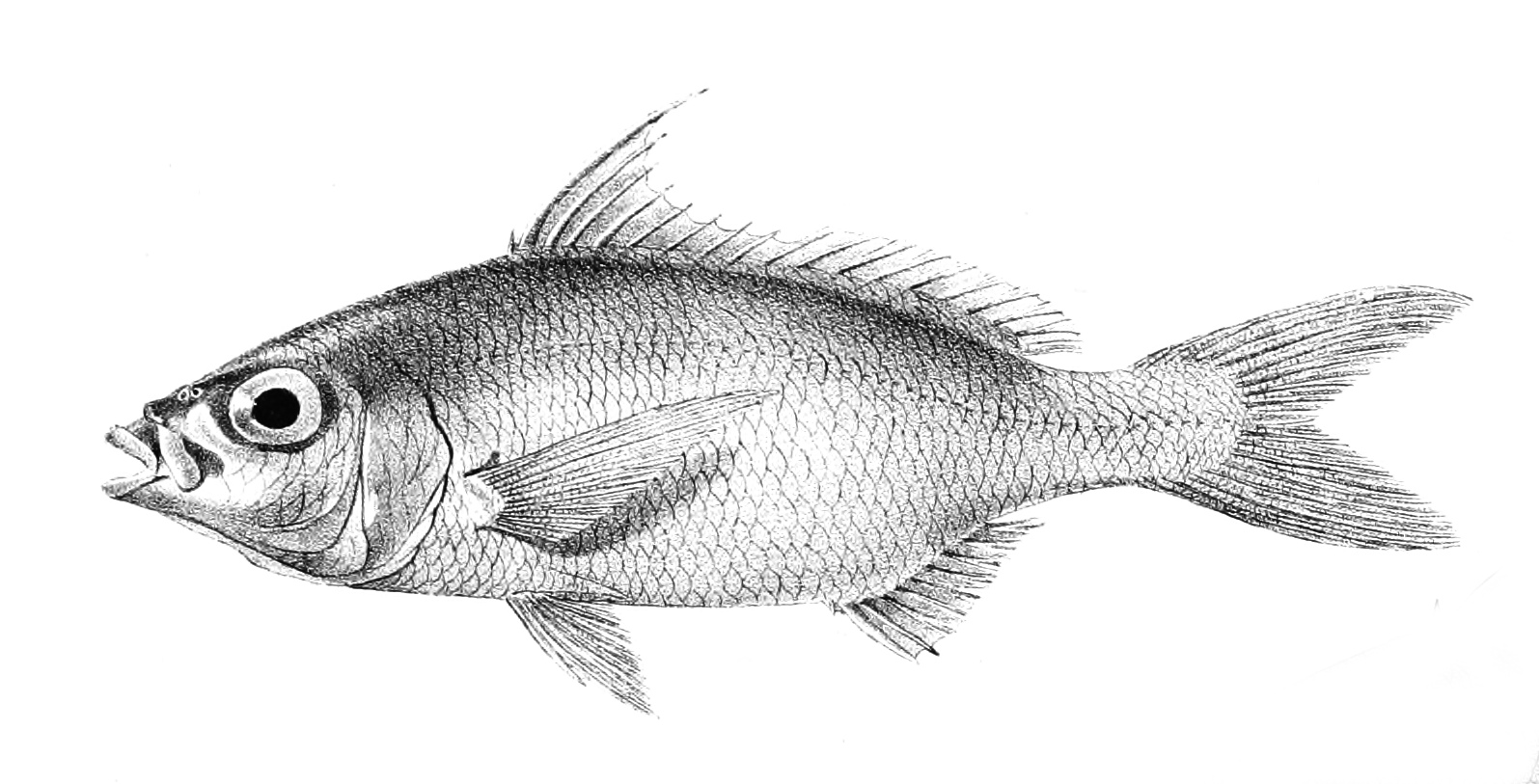

Conservation status
- Least Concern (IUCN 3.1)

Scientific classification
- Kingdom: Animalia
- Phylum: Chordata
- Class: Actinopterygii
- Order: Acanthuriformes
- Family: Gerreidae
- Genus: Gerres
- Species: G. oblongus

Binomial name
- Gerres oblongus (Cuvier, 1830)

Synonyms
- Equla oblongus (Cuvier, 1830); Gerres gigas Günther, 1862; Gerres macrosoma Bleeker, 1854

= Slender silver-biddy =

Species of ray-finned fish

The slender silver-biddy (Gerres oblongus) is a species of mojarra native to marine and brackish waters of coastal waters of the Indian Ocean and the western Pacific Ocean, far towards Vanuatu. It inhabits estuaries, coastal waters and lagoons. They inhabit at depths from 0 to 10 m (0 to 33 ft). This species can reach a length of 30 cm (12 in), with the average of 15 cm (5.9 in). This species is important to local commercial fisheries in many tropical countries.
