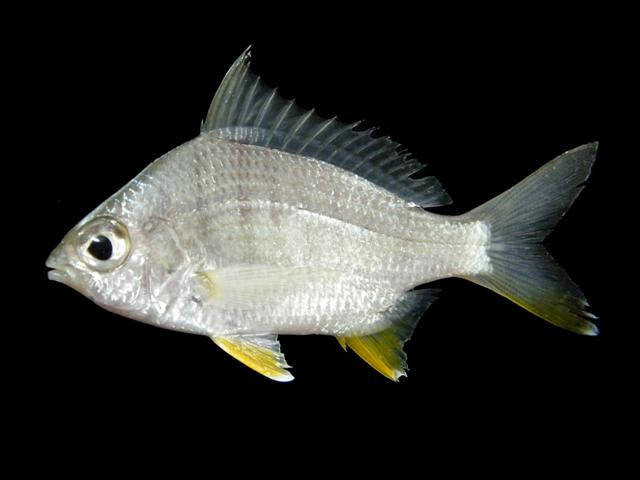

Conservation status
- Least Concern (IUCN 3.1)

Scientific classification
- Kingdom: Animalia
- Phylum: Chordata
- Class: Actinopterygii
- Order: Acanthuriformes
- Family: Gerreidae
- Genus: Gerres
- Species: G. erythrourus

Binomial name
- Gerres erythrourus (Bloch, 1791)

Synonyms
- Sparus erythrourus Bloch, 1791; Gerres abbreviatus Bleeker, 1850; Diapterus abbreviatus (Bleeker, 1850); Xystaema abbreviatus (Bleeker, 1850); Gerres singaporensis Steindachner, 1870; Gerres cheverti Alleyne & Macleay, 1877; Gerres profundus Macleay, 1878

= Gerres erythrourus =

Species of ray-finned fish

Gerres erythrourus the deep-bodied mojarra, also known as the short silverbiddy or short silverbelly, is a species of ray-finned fish from the family Gerreidae, a mojarra. It is native to marine and brackish waters of coastal waters of the Indian Ocean and the western Pacific Ocean, far towards Vanuatu. It inhabits estuaries, coastal waters and lagoons. This species can reach a length of 30 cm (12 in), with the average of 25 cm (9.8 in). This species is important to local commercial fisheries in many tropical countries.
