= Parequula =

Scientific classification
- Kingdom: Animalia
- Phylum: Chordata
- Class: Actinopterygii
- Order: Acanthuriformes
- Family: Gerreidae
- Genus: Parequula; Steindachner, 1879

Synonyms
- Chthamalopteryx Ogilby, 1888

Genus of fish

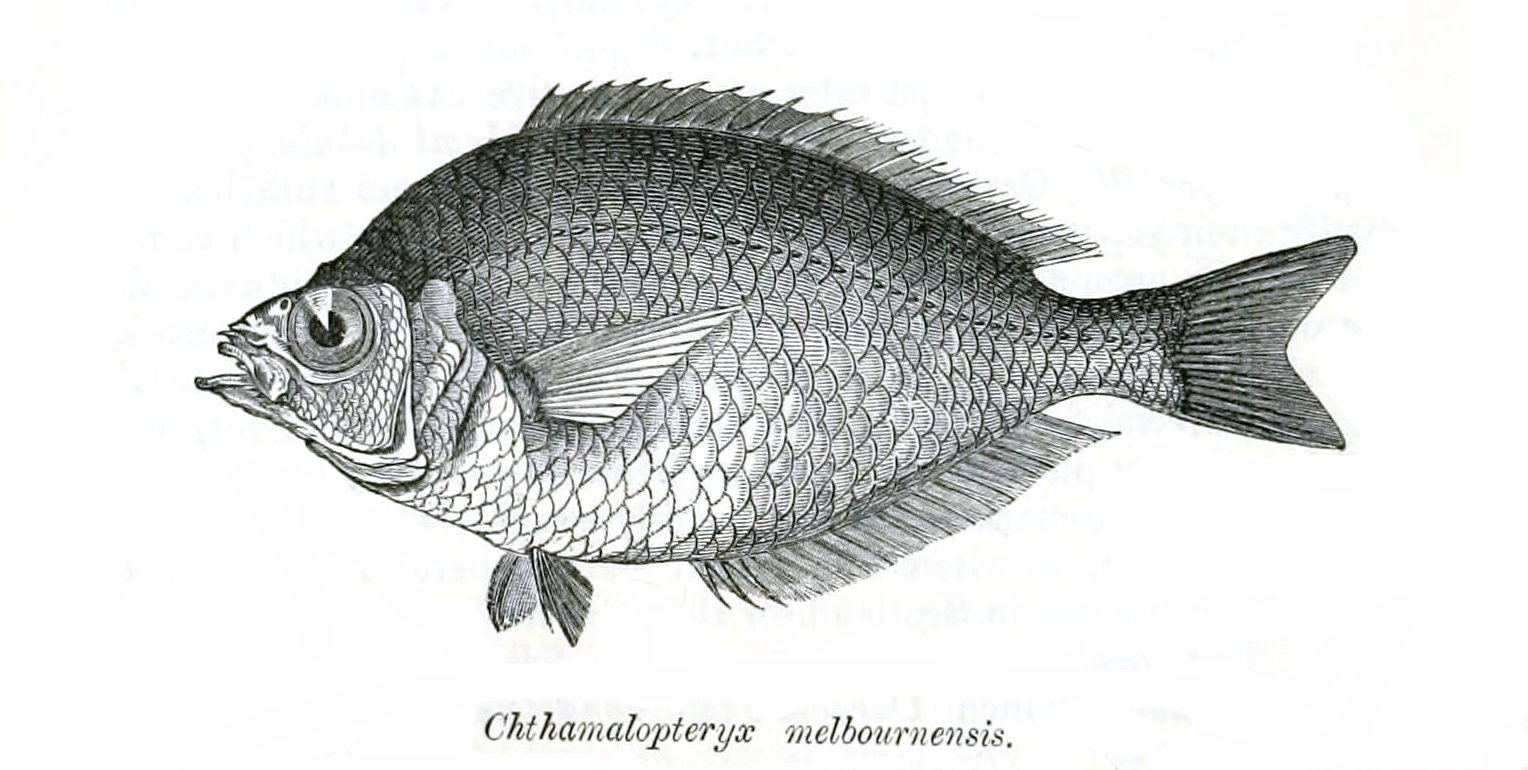
Parequula melbournensis

Parequula is a genus of silver biddy fishes from Australia, in the family Gerreidae.

== Species ==
There are two valid species in Parequula:

- Parequula elongata Iwatsuki, Pogonoski & Last, 2012
- Parequula melbournensis (Castelnau, 1872)
