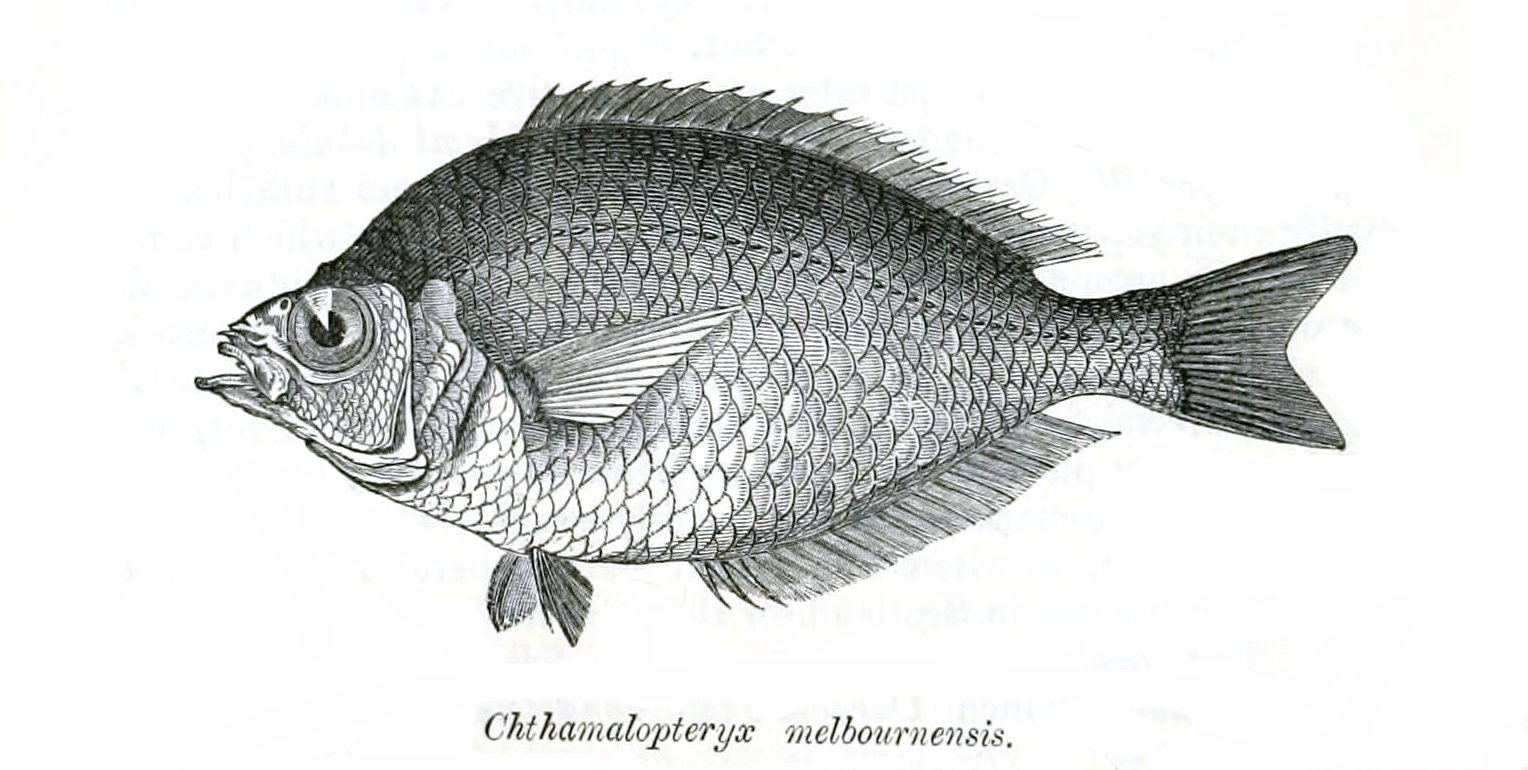

Scientific classification
- Kingdom: Animalia
- Phylum: Chordata
- Class: Actinopterygii
- Division: Teleostei
- Order: Acanthuriformes
- Family: Gerreidae
- Genus: Parequula; Steindachner, 1879
- Species: P. melbournensis

Binomial name
- Parequula melbournensis (Castelnau, 1872)

Synonyms
- Gerres melbournensis Castelnau, 1872; Chthamalopteryx melbournensis (Castelnau, 1872)

= Parequula melbournensis =

Species of ray-finned fish

Parequula melbournensis, the silverbelly, Melbourne silver biddy or silver biddy, is a species of ray-finned fish in the family Garreidae, the mojarras. The species was first described by Francis de Laporte de Castelnau in 1872. It is native to the coastal waters of southern Australia at depths from 3 to 100 m (10 to 330 ft). This species can reach 22 cm (8.7 in) in total length.

== Description ==
P. melbournensis is similar to Gerres subfasciatus, but can be distinguished from G. subfasciatus by its long-based anal fin and dorsal fin that is not anteriorly elevated.

== See also ==
- List of fishes of the Houtman Abrolhos
