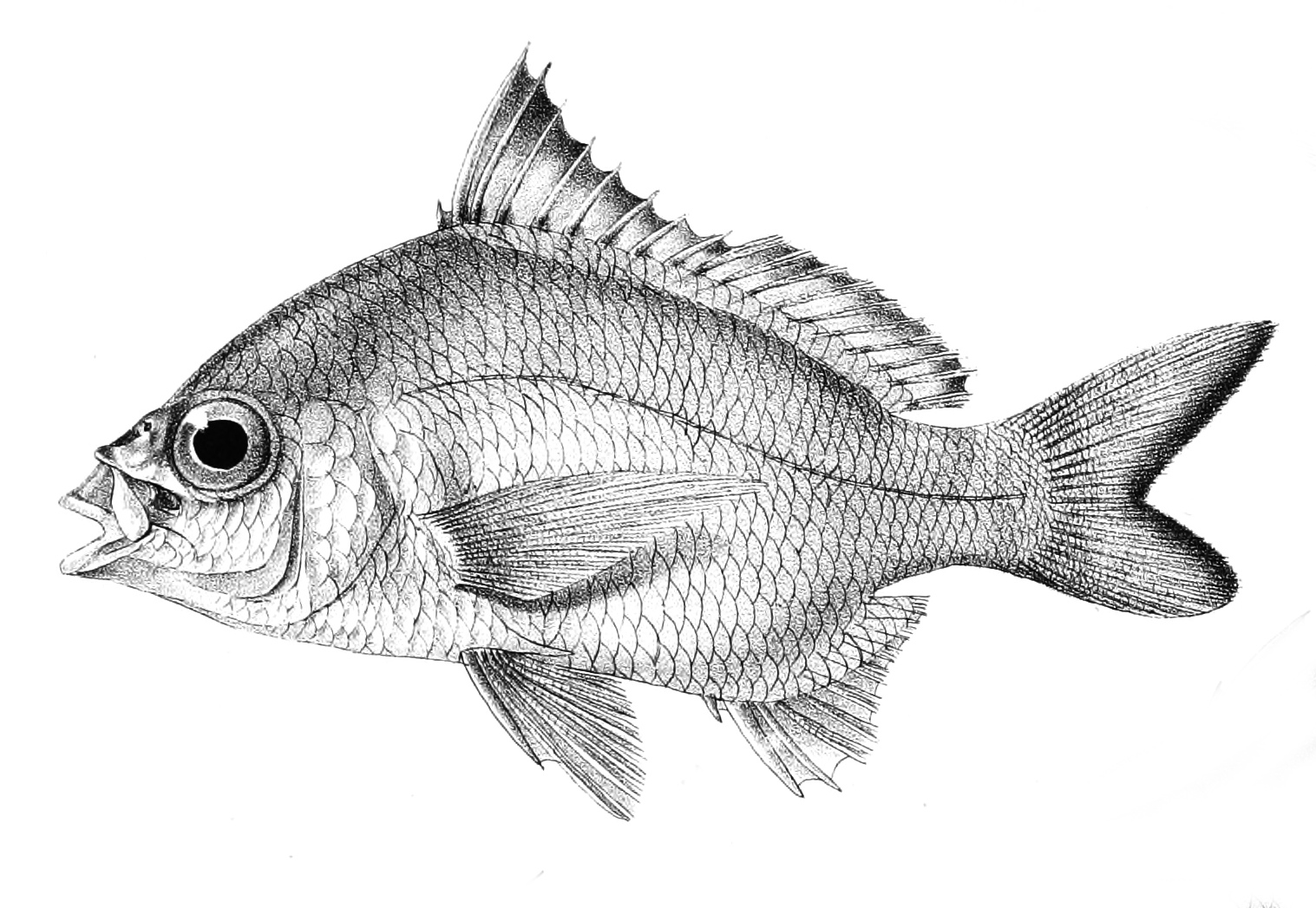

Conservation status
- Least Concern (IUCN 3.1)

Scientific classification
- Kingdom: Animalia
- Phylum: Chordata
- Class: Actinopterygii
- Order: Acanthuriformes
- Family: Gerreidae
- Genus: Gerres
- Species: G. oyena

Binomial name
- Gerres oyena (Forsskål, 1775)

Synonyms
- Labrus oeyena Forsskål, 1775; Diapterus oyena (Forsskål, 1775); Labrus oyena (Forsskål, 1775); Smaris oyena (Forsskål, 1775); Xystaema oyena (Forsskål, 1775); Cichla argyrea J. R. Forster, 1801; Gerres argyreus (J. R. Forster, 1801); Gerres vaigiensis Quoy & Gaimard, 1824; Gerres kapas Bleeker, 1851; Diapterus kapas (Bleeker, 1851); Xystaema kapas (Bleeker, 1851); Gerres australis Castelnau, 1875; Gerreomorpha rostrata Alleyne & Macleay, 1877; Gerres carinatus Alleyne & Macleay, 1877; Gerres splendens De Vis, 1884; Gerres socotranus Steindachner, 1902

= Common silver-biddy =

Species of fish

The common silver-biddy (Gerres oyena), also known as the blacktip silver biddy, Darnley Island silverbelly, longtail silverbiddy, oceanic silver biddy, shining silver-belly or slender silver belly, is a species of mojarra native to marine and brackish waters of coastal waters of the Indian Ocean and the western Pacific Ocean. It inhabits estuaries, coastal waters and lagoons. This species can reach a length of 30 cm (12 in), though most do not exceed 20 cm (7.9 in). This species is important to local commercial fisheries.

== Reproduction ==
Based on the seasonal reproductive cycle of the species, ovary development of the females occurs from March to September, while the testes development of the males occurs between March and August. For both sexes, the maximal development occurs during April and May. Using the gonadosomatic index, the minimum standard length (SL) at sexual maturity was 89.7 mm for the females and 81.4 mm for males. The size at which 50% of individuals were sexually mature was 104 mm SL in females and 92 mm SL in males.

== See also ==
- Japanese silver-biddy
