= Eucinostomus argenteus =

Conservation status
- Least Concern (IUCN 3.1)

Scientific classification
- Kingdom: Animalia
- Phylum: Chordata
- Class: Actinopterygii
- Order: Acanthuriformes
- Family: Gerreidae
- Genus: Eucinostomus
- Species: E. argenteus

Binomial name
- Eucinostomus argenteus Baird & Girard, 1855

Species of fish

Eucinostomus argenteus, the spotfin mojarra or silver mojarra, is a species of fish belonging to the family Gerreidae. The name spotfin mojarra is descriptive of the black spot that appears on the anterior part of the dorsal fin.

== Description ==
Mojarras are silvery in color and fairly diamond-shaped. They have smooth scales, anal spines, and forked tails. Mojarras have a single dorsal fin, with spines of decreasing length along the fin. The dorsal and anal fins have scaly sheaths at their bases. A unique feature of the family Gerreidae to which it belongs is the mouth, as the upper jaw extends downward when the mouth is opened and forms a tube. When the mouth is closed, the lower jaw is concave, providing another distinctive feature. The spotfin mojarra has a black spot on the anterior part of the dorsal fin. This species also has a groove on the top of its snout that lack scales, and generally has a more slender body than other species of mojarras. On the upper part of the body, faint, irregular bars are visible.

== Distribution and habitat ==
Mojarras are tropical species, but a small number of juvenile fish have been found in the Lower Hudson at Bowline Pond and Indian Point.

== Taxonomy ==
Eucinostomus argenteus was first formally described in 1855 by Spencer Fullerton Baird and Charles Frédéric Girard with the type locality given as Beesley's Point, New Jersey. It is the type species of the genus Eucinostomus as the genus was monotypic when Baird and Girard named it.
