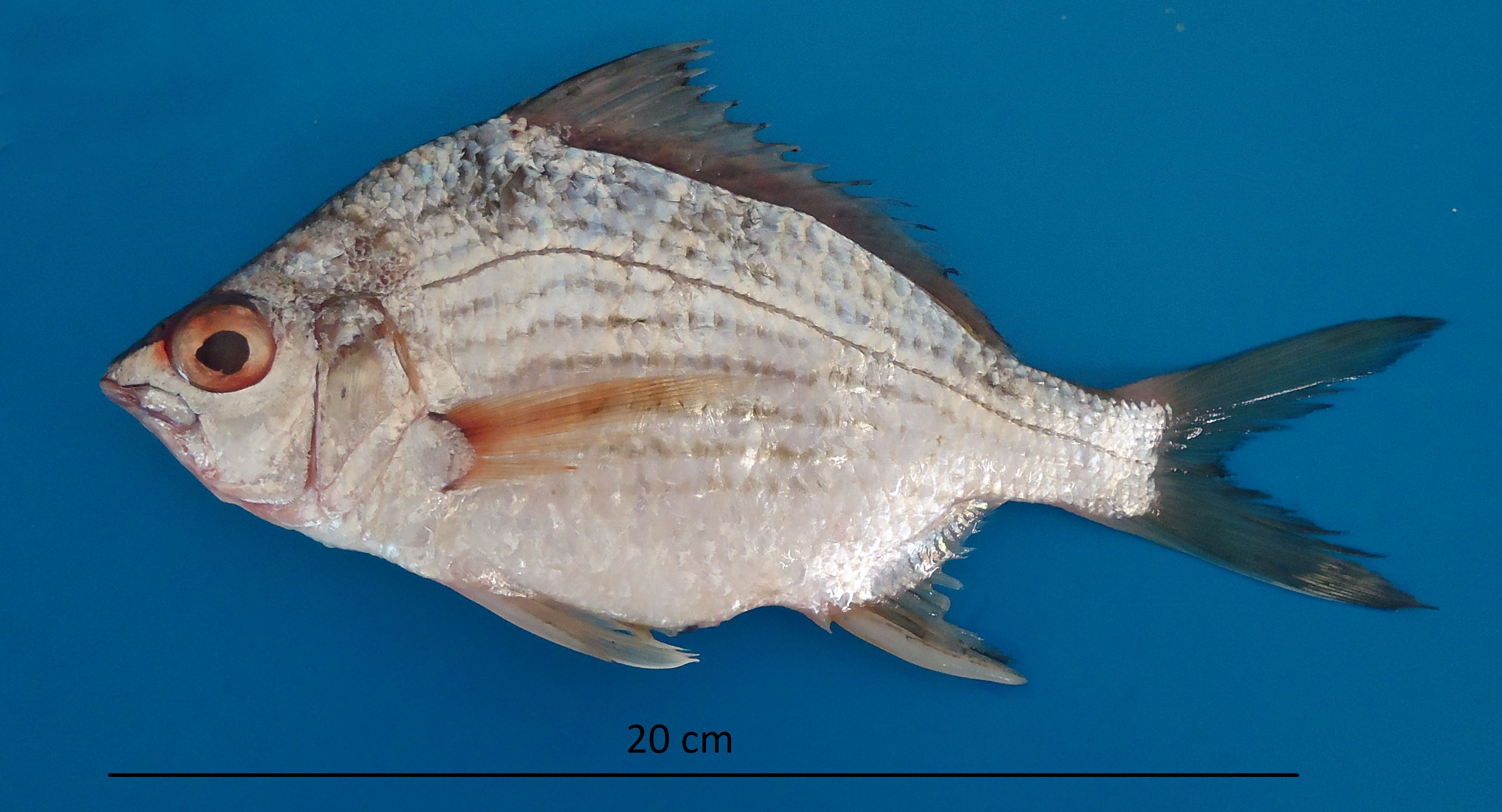
- Eugerres brasilianus

Scientific classification
- Kingdom: Animalia
- Phylum: Chordata
- Class: Actinopterygii
- Order: Acanthuriformes
- Family: Gerreidae
- Genus: Eugerres; D. S. Jordan & Evermann, 1927

Type species
- Gerres plumieri G. Cuvier, 1830

= Eugerres =

Genus of ray-finned fishes

Eugerres is a genus of ray-finned fish in the family Gerreidae, the mojarras. The genus was erected by David Starr Jordan and Barton Warren Evermann in 1927. They are native to the Atlantic and Pacific coasts of the Americas, occurring mainly in salt and brackish waters, but may enter fresh water. The genus also includes one strict fresh water species, E. mexicanus, native to southern Mexico and Guatemala.

== Species ==
The currently recognized species in this genus are:

- Eugerres awlae Schultz, 1949 (Maracaibo mojarra)
- Eugerres axillaris (Günther, 1864) (black axillary mojarra)
- Eugerres brasilianus (G. Cuvier, 1830) (Brazilian mojarra)
- Eugerres brevimanus (Günther, 1864) (short-fin mojarra)
- Eugerres lineatus (Humboldt, 1821) (streaked mojarra)
- Eugerres mexicanus (Steindachner, 1863) (Mexican mojarra)
- Eugerres plumieri (G. Cuvier, 1830) (striped mojarra)

Synonyms

- Eugerres castroaguirrei González-Acosta & Rodiles-Hernández, 2013; valid as E. mexicanus
- Eugerres periche (Evermann & Radcliffe, 1917) (Periche mojarra); valid as E. brevimanus
