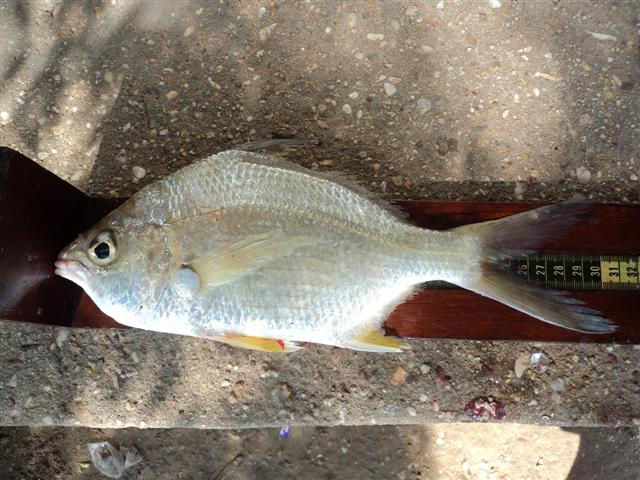

Conservation status
- Least Concern (IUCN 3.1)

Scientific classification
- Kingdom: Animalia
- Phylum: Chordata
- Class: Actinopterygii
- Order: Acanthuriformes
- Family: Gerreidae
- Genus: Diapterus
- Species: D. auratus

Binomial name
- Diapterus auratus Ranzani, 1842

Synonyms
- Gerres olisthostoma Goode & Bean, 1882; Diapterus olisthostomus (Goode & Bean, 1882); Eugerres olisthostoma (Goode & Bean, 1882); Diapterus evermanni Meek & Hildebrand, 1925; Moharra evermanni (Meek & Hildebrand, 1925)

= Irish mojarra =

Species of fish

Diapterus auratus, the Irish mojarra or Irish pompano, is a species of ray-finned fish from the family Gerreidae, the mojarras. Other common names for this species are the broad shad, silver perch and muttonfish. It is found in the warmer waters of the western Atlantic Ocean.

== Description ==
Diapterus auratus has a rhomboidal, compressed body with the head showing a lower profile which is distinctively concave. It has a very extensible mouth which points downwards when protruded. The jaws are equipped with tiny, brush-like teeth, although they appear to be toothless, and there are pointed teeth inside the throat. The tail is fin deeply forked. It has large, conspicuous scales which have a rough texture created by a fine serrations on the scales. The scales cover most of the head and body. The dorsal and anal fins fold into an elevated scale-covered sheath which runs along the base of these fins. The colour is silvery to olive overall, slightly darker on the upperside, and the spiny dorsal fin has a thin black edge. The juveniles have three narrow vertical dark bars. The pelvic and anal fins are coloured yellow while the rest of the fins are translucent or dusky. The second spine in the anal fin is longer and thicker than the third spine and the rays. The maximum recorded total length is 34 centimetres (13 in) but a more common total length is 20 centimetres (7.9 in) while the maximum published weight is 680 grams (1.50 lb).

== Distribution ==
Diapterus auratus is found in the western Atlantic Ocean where its distribution extends from the south eastern United States, along the Gulf of Mexico coast from western Florida to the Yucatan, through the Caribbean Sea and along the Central American coast and then along the northern and eastern coasts of South America to São Paulo, Brazil. The juveniles are more widespread than the adults and this species is a vagrant to the Atlantic coast of the United States as far north as New Jersey.

== Habitat and biology ==
Diapterus auratus is a demersal fish which can be found in shallow coastal waters at depths sown to 10 metres (33 ft) where is shows a strong association with lagoons and vegetated sand grounds, it is also a frequently encountered transient species in mangrove-lined creeks. The largest numbers are found in areas where there is submerged vegetation and at locations more distant from the inlets of seawater into lagoons where there is lower salinity. The adults and juvenile fish are found in brackish and saltwater lagoons as well as protected bays. These fish often enter freshwater rivers and streams. The species shows seasonal fluctuations in populations and the monthly mean number of this species sampled are correlated with variations in local rainfall and the productivity of lagoon systems. Its feeds largely on benthic invertebrates, but this species also grazes on detritus, algae and cyanobacteria. The smaller fish, with a total length of less than 11.5 centimetres (4.5 in), feed mainly on plant material but will also eat nematodes, copepods, and ostracods.

== Human utilisation and threats ==
Diapterus auratus is a sought after species by fisheries in Colombia but it is taken as a bycatch by shrimp fisheries in Mexico. It is affected by pollution and the destruction of seagrass beds, especially in Florida. This warm water species can be subject to mass die offs at the northern part of its range during periods of cold water temperatures. There is no bag limit for anglers for this species in Texas. In Florida they are marketed fresh and the markets sell up to 100,000 kilograms (220,000 lb) per annum. This species is easily caught with a cast net or seine net from the beach.

== Naming and taxonomy ==
Diapterus auratus was first formally described in 1841 by the Italian priest and naturalist Camillo Ranzani (1775-1841) with the type locality being the seas around Brazil. At the time it was described it was the only species classified in the genus Diapterus and is thus the type species for that genus.
