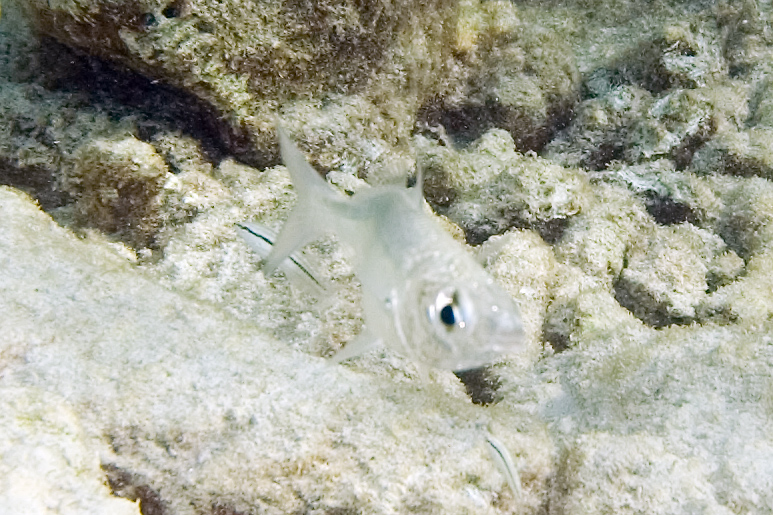
- Mottled mojarra fish

Conservation status
- Least Concern (IUCN 3.1)

Scientific classification
- Kingdom: Animalia
- Phylum: Chordata
- Class: Actinopterygii
- Order: Acanthuriformes
- Family: Gerreidae
- Genus: Eucinostomus; D. S. Jordan & Evermann, 1895
- Species: E. lefroyi

Binomial name
- Eucinostomus lefroyi (Goode, 1874)

Synonyms
- Diapterus lefroyi Goode, 1874; Ulaema lefroyi (Goode, 1874); Eucinostomus productus Poey, 1875

= Mottled mojarra =

Species of ray-finned fish

The mottled mojarra (Eucinostomus lefroyi) is a species of mojarra native to the Atlantic and Gulf of Mexico coasts of the Americas from North Carolina to Brazil, where adults can be found off sandy shorelines. This species grows to 23 cm (9.1 in) total length, and is sometimes classified in the monotypic genus Ulaema.
