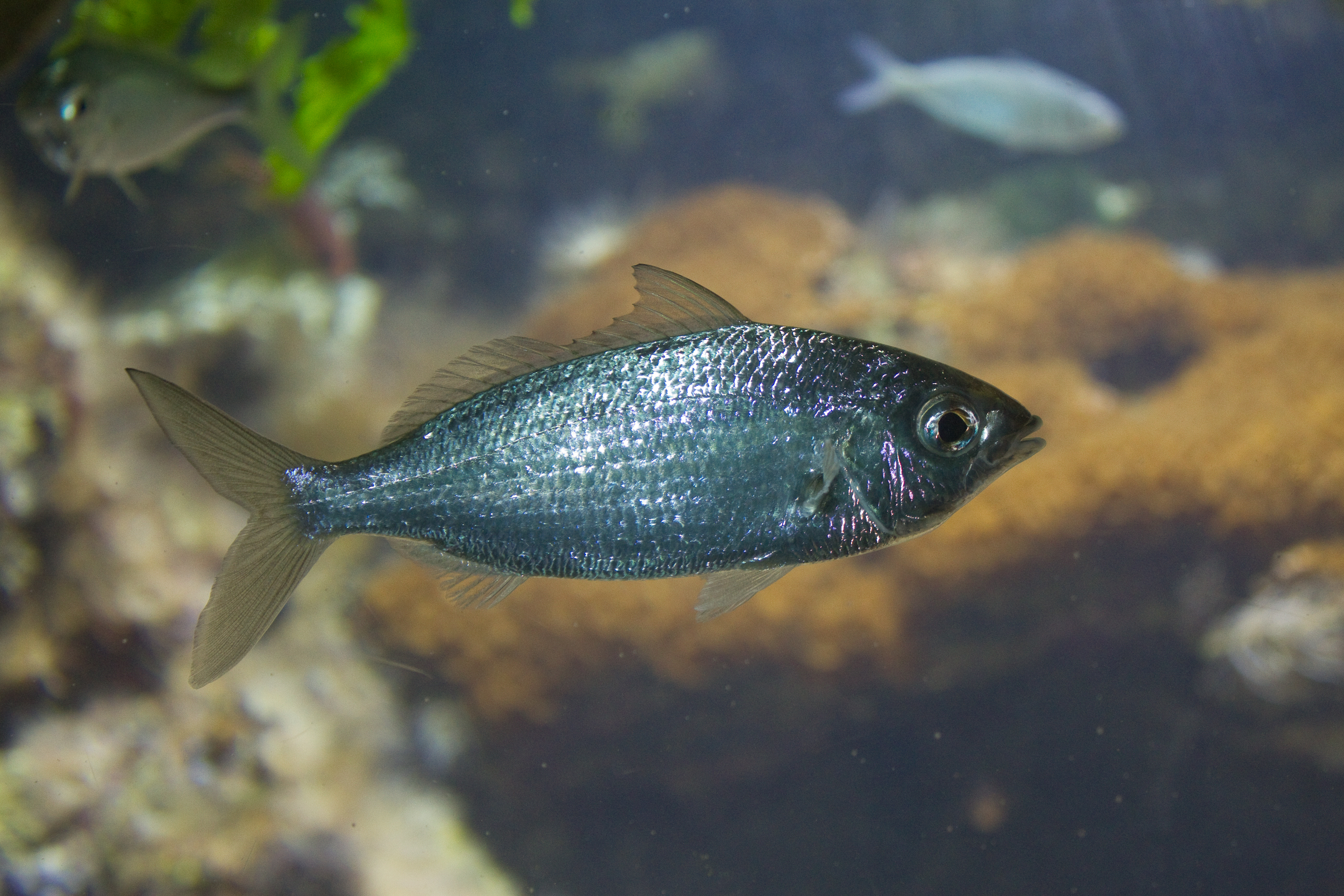
- Eucinostomus sp.

Scientific classification
- Kingdom: Animalia
- Phylum: Chordata
- Class: Actinopterygii
- Order: Acanthuriformes
- Family: Gerreidae
- Genus: Eucinostomus; S. F. Baird & Girard, 1855

Type species
- Eucinostomus argenteus S. F. Baird & Girard, 1855

= Eucinostomus =

Genus of ray-finned fishes

Eucinostomus is a genus of ray-finned fish in the family Gerreidae (mojarras). They are native to the Atlantic and Pacific coasts of the Americas.

== Species ==
There are currently 11 recognized species in this genus:

- Eucinostomus argenteus S. F. Baird & Girard, 1855 (Silver mojarra)
- Eucinostomus currani Zahuranec, 1980 (Pacific flagfin mojarra)
- Eucinostomus dowii (T. N. Gill, 1863) (Dow's mojarra)
- Eucinostomus entomelas Zahuranec, 1980 (Dark-spot mojarra)
- Eucinostomus gracilis (T. N. Gill, 1862) (Graceful mojarra)
- Eucinostomus gula (G. Cuvier & Valenciennes, 1824) (Jenny mojarra)
- Eucinostomus harengulus Goode & T. H. Bean, 1879 (Tide-water mojarra)
- Eucinostomus havana (Nichols, 1912) (Big-eye mojarra)
- Eucinostomus jonesii (Günther, 1879) (Slender mojarra)
- Eucinostomus lefroyi (Goode, 1874) (Mottled mojarra)
- Eucinostomus melanopterus (Bleeker, 1863) (Flag-fin mojarra)

Incertae sedis

- Eucinostomus meeki C. H. Eigenmann, 1903
