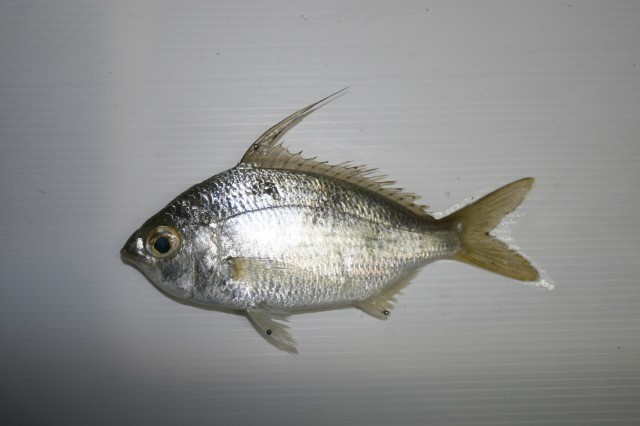

Conservation status
- Least Concern (IUCN 3.1)

Scientific classification
- Kingdom: Animalia
- Phylum: Chordata
- Class: Actinopterygii
- Order: Acanthuriformes
- Family: Gerreidae
- Genus: Gerres
- Species: G. filamentosus

Binomial name
- Gerres filamentosus (Cuvier, 1829)

Synonyms
- Pertica filamentosa (Cuvier, 1829); Gerres punctatus Cuvier, 1830; Sparus edentulus Günther, 1859; Gerres philippinus Günther, 1862

= Gerres filamentosus =

Species of ray-finned fish

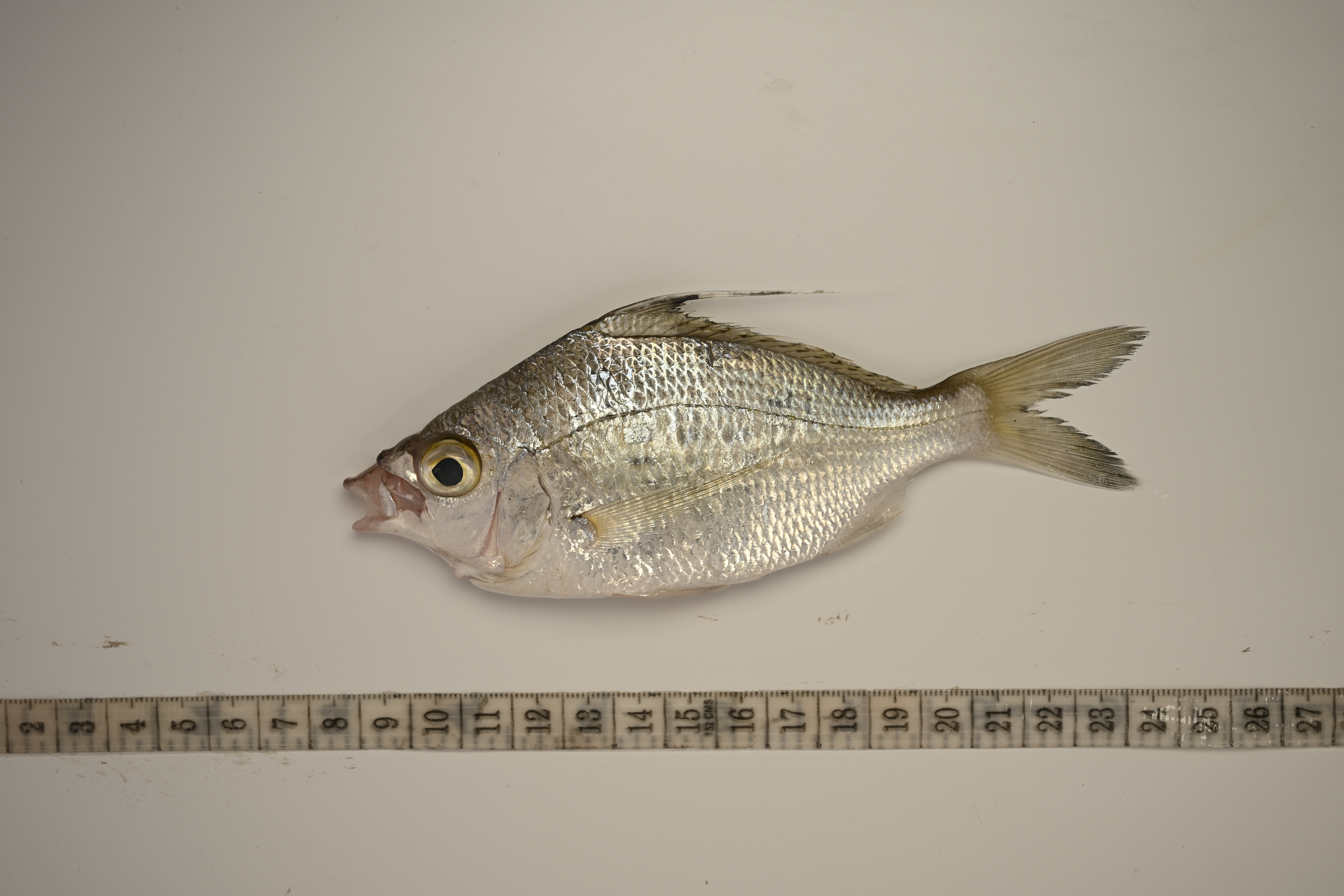
Gerres filamentosus

Gerres filamentosus, the whipfin silver-biddy, flagfin mojarra or threadfin silver belly, is a ray-finned fish native to the coastline of Africa and Madagascar east to Japan, Australia and New Caledonia.
