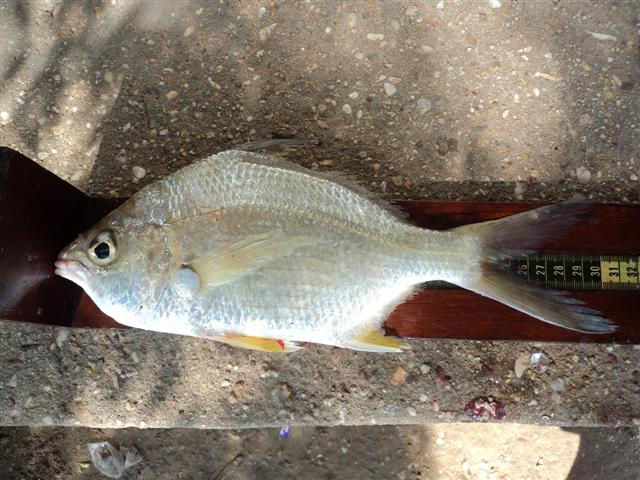
- Diapterus auratus

Scientific classification
- Domain: Eukaryota
- Kingdom: Animalia
- Phylum: Chordata
- Class: Actinopterygii
- Order: Acanthuriformes
- Family: Gerreidae
- Genus: Diapterus; Ranzani, 1842

Type species
- Diapterus auratus Ranzani, 1842

Synonyms
- Moharra Poey, 1875

= Diapterus =

Genus of ray-finned fishes

Diapterus is a genus of ray-finned fish in the family Gerreidae, the mojarras. They are native to the Atlantic and Pacific coasts of the Americas.

== Species ==
The currently recognized species in this genus are:

- Diapterus auratus Ranzani, 1842 (Irish mojarra)
- Diapterus brevirostris (Sauvage, 1879) (Shortnose mojarra)
- Diapterus peruvianus (G. Cuvier, 1830) (Peruvian mojarra)
- Diapterus rhombeus (G. Cuvier, 1829) (Caitipa mojarra)
