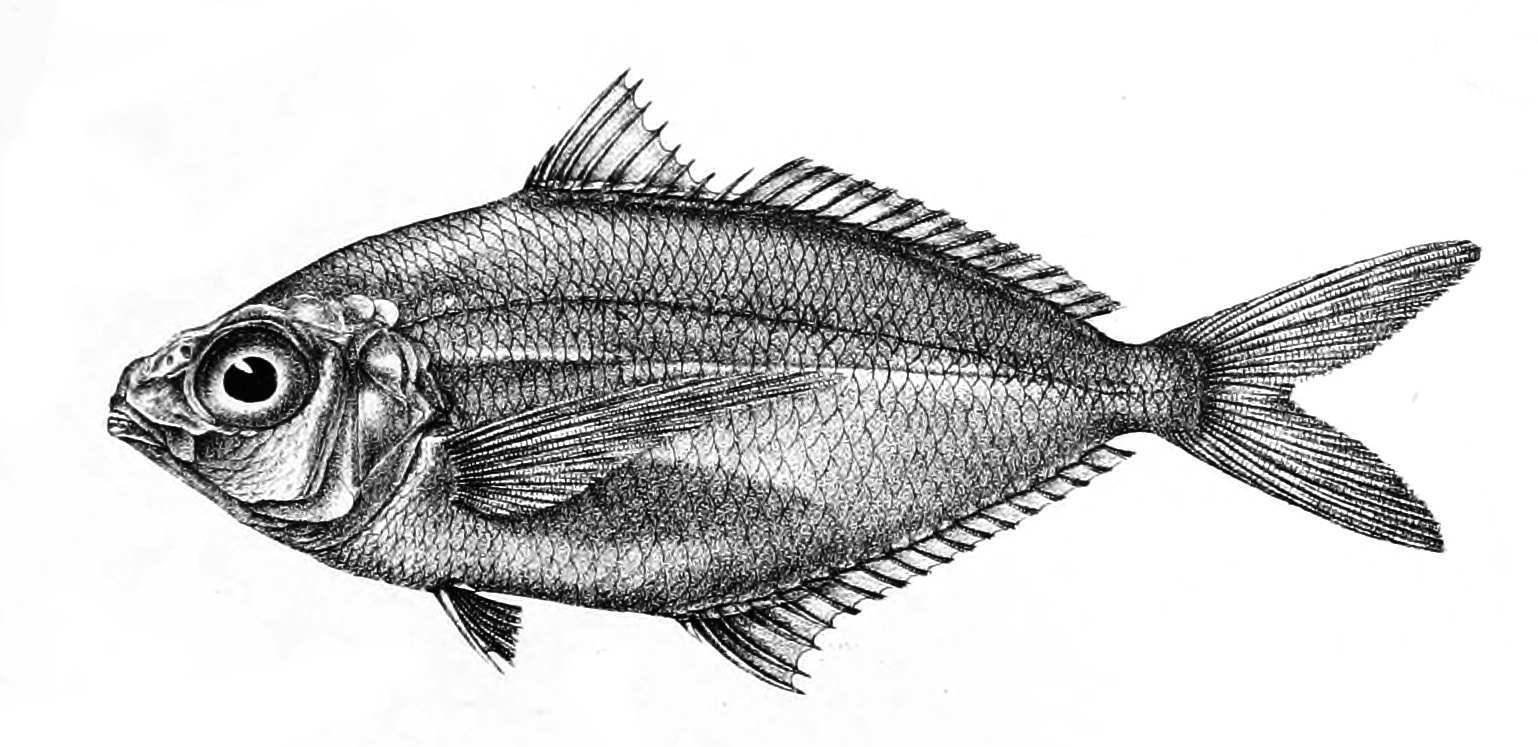

Conservation status
- Least Concern (IUCN 3.1)

Scientific classification
- Kingdom: Animalia
- Phylum: Chordata
- Class: Actinopterygii
- Order: Acanthuriformes
- Family: Gerreidae
- Genus: Pentaprion; Bleeker, 1850
- Species: P. longimanus

Binomial name
- Pentaprion longimanus (Cantor, 1849)

Synonyms
- Equula longimana Cantor, 1849

= Longfin mojarra =

Longfin mojarra Temporal range: Early Miocene–present

Species of ray-finned fish

The longfin mojarra (Pentaprion longimanus) is a species of mojarra native to the coastal waters of the Indian Ocean from India to the western Pacific. This species grows to 15 cm (5.9 in) in total length, though most do not exceed 10 cm (3.9 in). This species is of minor importance to local commercial fisheries, usually being made into fish meal or feed for ducks. It is the only extant member of the genus Pentaprion. A second fossil species, †Pentaprion sahnii Tiwari & Bannikov, 2001 is known from the Early Miocene of Mizoram, India.
