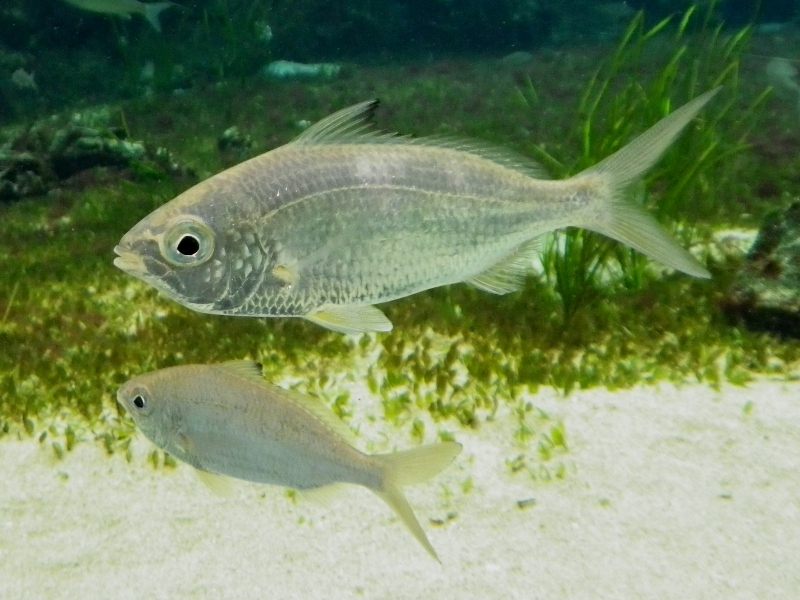

Scientific classification
- Kingdom: Animalia
- Phylum: Chordata
- Class: Actinopterygii
- Division: Teleostei
- Order: Acanthuriformes
- Family: Gerreidae
- Genus: Gerres
- Species: G. equulus

Binomial name
- Gerres equulus Temminck & Schlegel, 1844

Synonyms
- Gerres equula Temminck & Schlegel, 1844; Eucinostomus equula (Temminck & Schlegel, 1844)

= Japanese silver-biddy =

Species of ray-finned fish

The Japanese silver-biddy (Gerres equulus) is a species of mojarra native to the coastal waters of the western Pacific Ocean from southern Korea to southern Japan, though it does not occur around the Ryukyu Islands. This species can reach 22.4 cm (8.8 in) in standard length. It is commercially important for the local fish industry in Japan.

== Reproduction ==
G. equulus is a multiple spawner. Its spawning season is continuous from June to September. The female gains sexual maturity at a minimum of 141 mm long.

== See also ==
- Common silver-biddy
