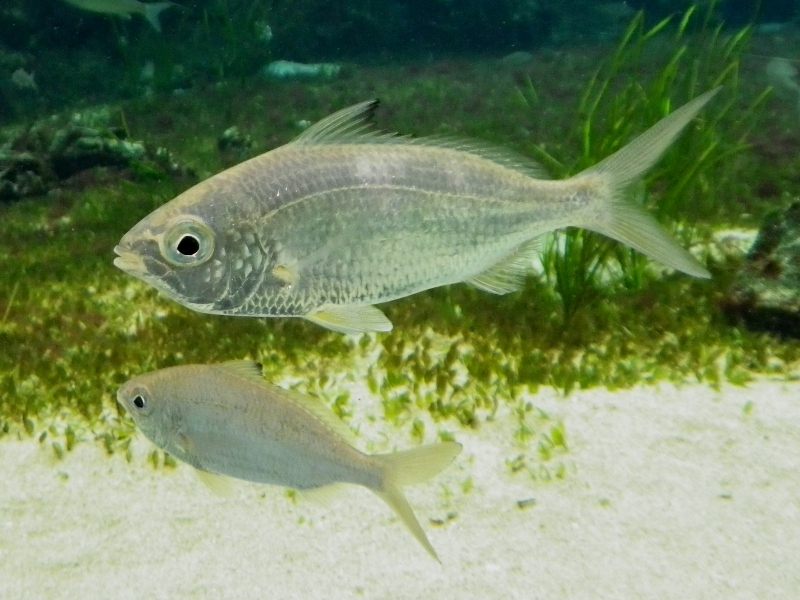
- G. equulus

Scientific classification
- Kingdom: Animalia
- Phylum: Chordata
- Class: Actinopterygii
- Order: Acanthuriformes
- Family: Gerreidae
- Genus: Gerres; Quoy & Gaimard, 1824

Type species
- Gerres vaigiensis Quoy & Gaimard, 1824

= Gerres =

Genus of ray-finned fishes

Gerres is a genus of mojarras found mostly in coastal regions from the eastern Atlantic Ocean through the Indian Ocean to the western Pacific. A single species, G. simillimus, is from the East Pacific. They mainly inhabit salt and brackish waters, but will enter fresh water.

== Species ==
The 28 currently recognized species in this genus are:

- Gerres akazakii Iwatsuki, Seishi Kimura & Yoshino, 2007 (Japanese ten-spined silver-biddy)
- Gerres baconensis (Evermann & Seale, 1907) (scaly-snouted silver-biddy)
- Gerres chrysops Iwatsuki, Seishi Kimura & Yoshino, 1999 (gold sheen silver-biddy)
- Gerres cinereus (Walbaum, 1792) (yellowfin mojarra)
- Gerres decacanthus (Bleeker, 1864) (small Chinese silver-biddy)
- Gerres equulus Temminck & Schlegel, 1844 (Japanese silver-biddy)
- Gerres erythrourus (Bloch, 1791) (deep-bodied mojarra)
- Gerres filamentosus G. Cuvier, 1829 (whipfin silver-biddy)
- Gerres infasciatus Iwatsuki & Seishi Kimura, 1998 (nonbanded whipfin mojarra)
- Gerres japonicus Bleeker, 1854 (Japanese silver-biddy)
- Gerres limbatus G. Cuvier, 1830 (saddleback silver-biddy)
- Gerres longirostris (Lacépède, 1801) (strongspine silver-biddy)

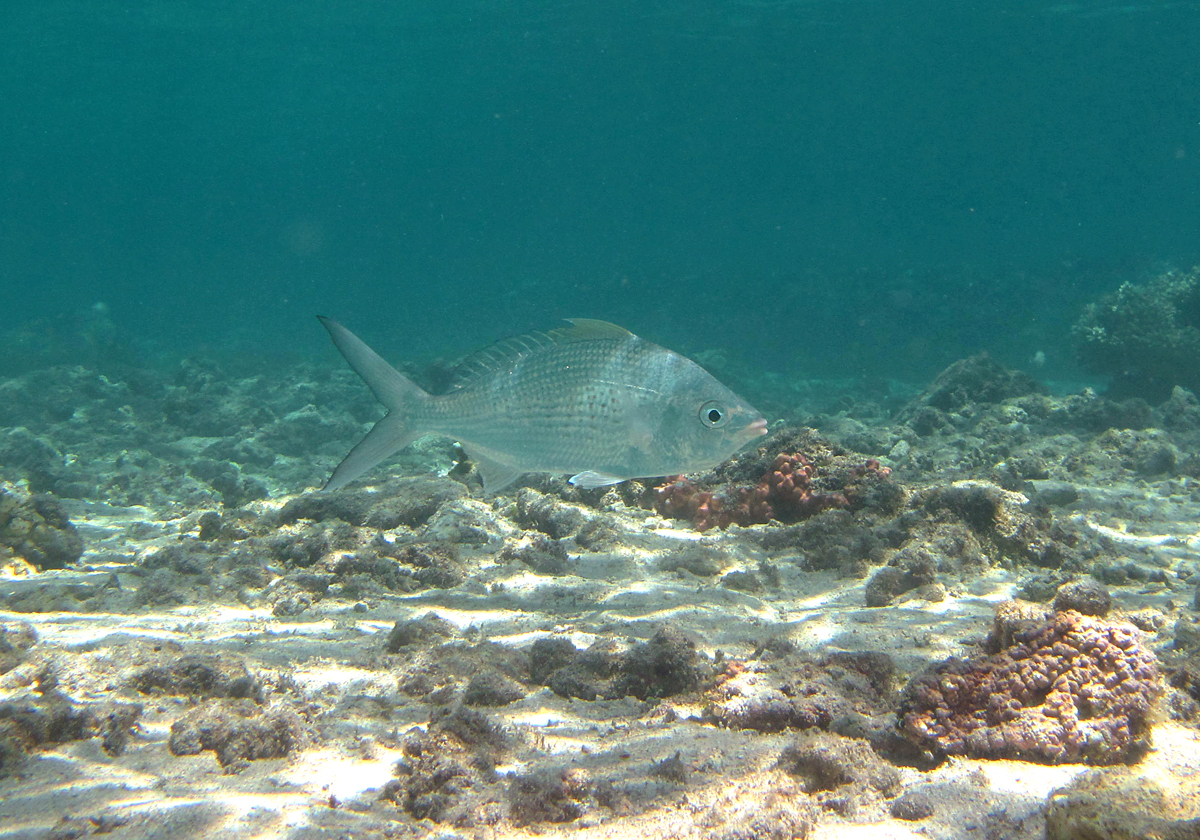
A strongspine silver-biddy Gerres longirostris.

- Gerres macracanthus Bleeker, 1854 (longspine silverbiddy)
- Gerres maldivensis Regan, 1902
- Gerres methueni Regan, 1920 (Striped silver biddy)
- Gerres microphthalmus Iwatsuki, Seishi Kimura & Yoshino, 2002 (small-eyed whipfin mojarra)
- Gerres mozambiquensis Iwatsuki & Heemstra, 2007
- Gerres nigri Günther, 1859 (Guinean striped mojarra)
- Gerres oblongus G. Cuvier, 1830 (slender silver-biddy)
- Gerres oyena (Forsskål, 1775) (common silver-biddy)
- Gerres phaiya Iwatsuki & Heemstra, 2001 (strong-spined silver-biddy)
- Gerres ryukyuensis Iwatsuki, Seishi Kimura & Yoshino, 2007 (Ryukyu banded silver-biddy)
- Gerres septemfasciatus J. Liu & Y. R. Yan, 2009 (seven-banded silver-biddy)
- Gerres setifer (F. Hamilton, 1822) (small Bengal silver-biddy)
- Gerres shima Iwatsuki, Seishi Kimura & Yoshino, 2007 (banded silver-biddy)
- Gerres silaceus Iwatsuki, Seishi Kimura & Yoshino, 2001 (Malayan silver-biddy)
- Gerres simillimus Regan, 1907
- Gerres subfasciatus G. Cuvier, 1830 (common silver belly)
