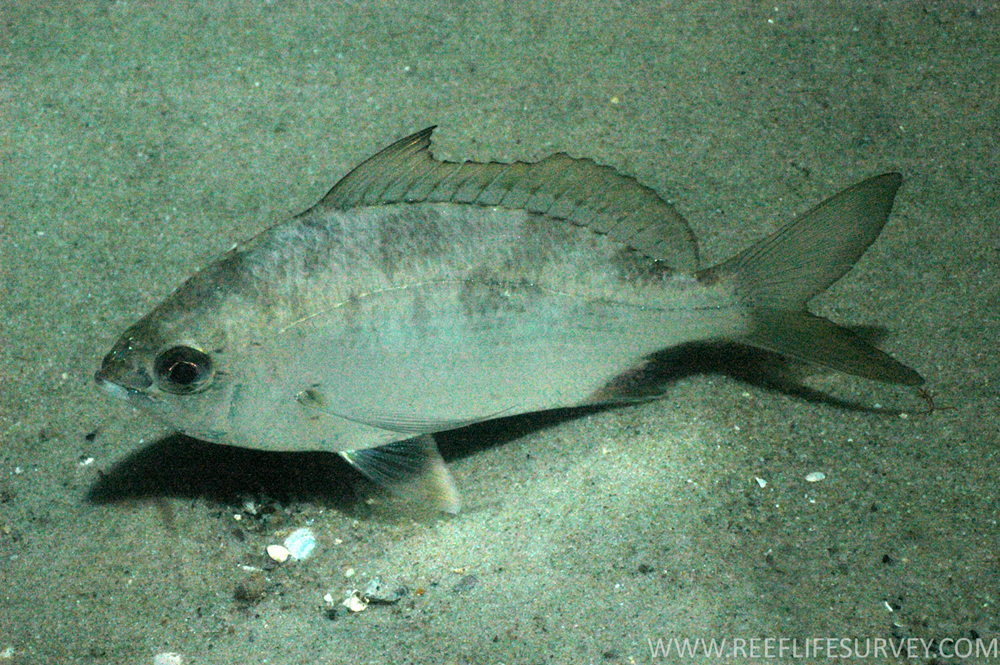

Conservation status
- Least Concern (IUCN 3.1)

Scientific classification
- Kingdom: Animalia
- Phylum: Chordata
- Class: Actinopterygii
- Order: Acanthuriformes
- Family: Gerreidae
- Genus: Gerres
- Species: G. subfasciatus

Binomial name
- Gerres subfasciatus G. Cuvier, 1830

Synonyms
- Gerres ovatus Günther, 1859

= Gerres subfasciatus =

Species of fishes

Gerres subfasciatus, the common silver belly roach, ovate silver biddy, common silverbiddy or Southern silver biddy, is a species of mojarra native to Indian and Pacific coastal waters of Australia.

== Description ==
It can be identified by its silver-colored body that can grow up to 20 cm long. The fish has a highly protrusible jaw, a long-based dorsal fin, and black-tipped anterior spines that are longer that those in the rest of the fin. Both jaws of G. subfasciatus have the ability to protrude out and down to form a tube shape, used to feed on bottom-dwelling invertebrates.

== Habitat ==
The distribution of the common silver belly ranges from south-western Western Australia in the region of the tropical north of Australia and in the south on the east coast to southern New South Wales. Typically observed to form schools over sandy bottoms, it inhabits estuaries and coastal reefs.
