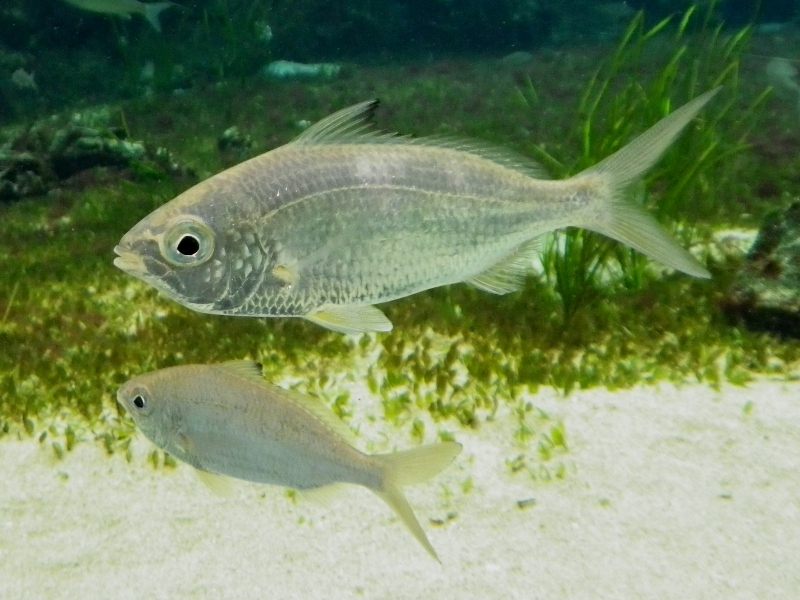
- Gerres equulus

Scientific classification
- Kingdom: Animalia
- Phylum: Chordata
- Class: Actinopterygii
- Order: Acanthuriformes
- Family: Gerreidae; Bleeker, 1859

Genera
- See text.

= Mojarra =

Mojarra Temporal range: Late Oligocene to present Possible Early Eocene occurrence

Family of fishes

The mojarras are a family, Gerreidae, of fish in the order Perciformes. The family includes about 53 species found worldwide in tropical and warm temperate regions. They mostly inhabit coastal salt and brackish waters, although some occur in fresh water.

Mojarras are a common prey and bait fish in many parts of the world, including the South American coast and Caribbean islands, as well as the Gulf of Mexico and the Atlantic Coast of North America. These species tend to be difficult to identify in the field, and often require microscopic examination. Most species exhibit a schooling behavior and tend to exploit the shallow water refugia associated with coastal areas presumably to avoid large-bodied predators, such as the lemon shark.

Mojarra is also commonly used in Latin American countries as a name for various species of the cichlid family, including tilapia.

== Genera ==
The 10 genera currently assigned to this family are:

- Deckertichthys Vergara-Solana, 2014
- Diapterus Ranzani, 1842
- Eucinostomus Baird & Girard, 1855
- Eugerres Jordan & Evermann, 1927
- Gerres Quoy & Gaimard, 1824
- Parequula Steindachner, 1879
- Pentaprion Bleeker, 1850
- Ulaema Jordan & Evermann 1895

These fossil genera are also known:

- ?†Aspesiperca Bannikov, 2008
- †Gerreidarum [otolith]
- †Pharisatichthys Gaudant & Carnevale, 2015

== See also ==
- Silver biddy
