= Leo Margolis =

Canadian parasitologist (1927–1997)

- Born: December 18, 1927; Montreal, Quebec
- Died: January 13, 1997 (aged 69)
- Education: McGill University
- Scientific career
- Fields: Parasitology
- Workplaces: Pacific Biological Station

Leo Margolis, OC FRSC (December 18, 1927 – January 13, 1997) was a Canadian parasitologist. He was a pioneer in the use of parasites for identification of Pacific Ocean fish stocks. His discoveries became a crucial point in negotiations over pacific salmon fisheries, as it could now be determined where each individual fish spawned, in the rivers of Canada or the United States.

Born in Montreal, Quebec, he received a B.Sc. in 1948, a M.Sc. in 1950, and a Ph.D in 1952 from McGill University. He joined the Pacific Biological Station in Nanaimo, British Columbia, where was a government scientist, advisor, and diplomatic representative. He became Head of the Fish Health and Parasitology Section of the Station in 1967 and was appointed Senior Scientist in 1990. He suffered a heart attack in 1997 while walking home from work and died several days later, at the age of 69, after being airlifted to a Vancouver hospital.

== Research ==
Margolis published a number of papers on fish parasites, but he is famous in the whole community of parasitologists for a paper on "the use of ecological terms in parasitology" published in 1982. In 1981, the American Society of Parasitologists appointed an ad hoc committee "to establish working definitions of a few terms used and misused by parasitological ecologists", and Margolis was the chairman of this committee. The paper contains the definition of widely used terms such as prevalence and has subsequently been cited thousands of times.

== Honours ==
- Fellow of the Royal Society of Canada, 1975
- Officer of the Order of Canada, 1990
- Honorary Member Atlantic Canada Society of Parasitologists, 1992
- Honorary Member British Society of Parasitology, 1994
- Gold Medal Professional Institute of the Public Service of Canada, 1995
- Distinguished Service Award American Society of Parasitologists, 1995
- Honorary D.Sc., St. Mary's University, 1995

== Eponymous taxa ==
A number of taxa have been named in the honour of Leo Margolis. These include genera such as Margolisia Bray, 1987 (Digenea, Opecoelidae), Margolisianum Blaylock & Overstreet, 1999 (Nematoda, Philometridae) and Margolisius Benz, Kabata & Bullard, 2000 (Copepoda, Lernaeopodidae), and species, such as Allopodocotyle margolisi Gibson, 1995 (Digenea, Opecoelidae), Steringophorus margolisi Bray, 1995 (Digenea, Fellodistomatidae), Acanthochondria margolisi Kabata, 1984 (Copepoda, Chondracanthidae), and Philometra margolisi Moravec, Vidal-Martínez & Aguirre-Macedo, 1995 (Nematoda, Philometridae). All these are parasites.
