= Pseudoheterolebes =

Scientific classification
- Kingdom: Animalia
- Phylum: Platyhelminthes
- Class: Trematoda
- Order: Plagiorchiida
- Family: Opecoelidae
- Subfamily: Opistholebetinae
- Genus: Pseudoheterolebes; Yamaguti, 1959

Genus of flukes

Pseudoheterolebes is a genus of trematodes in the family Opecoelidae. After having been originally described, it was largely ignored by other scientists due to the originally vague definition of the genus; Martin et al., 2018 resurrected the genus to resolve a dispute among the existing definitions of Opistholebes and Maculifer, which were also described by earlier reports of Yamaguti.

== Species ==
- Pseudoheterolebes adcotylophorus (Manter, 1947) Martin, Ribu, Cutmore & Cribb, 2018
- Pseudoheterolebes corazonae Martin, Ribu, Cutmore & Cribb, 2018
- Pseudoheterolebes cotylophorus (Ozaki, 1935) Yamaguti, 1959
- Pseudoheterolebes diodontis (Cable, 1956) Martin, Ribu, Cutmore & Cribb, 2018
- Pseudoheterolebes stellaglobulus Martin, Ribu, Cutmore & Cribb, 2018
