= Orthodena =

Scientific classification
- Kingdom: Animalia
- Phylum: Platyhelminthes
- Class: Trematoda
- Order: Plagiorchiida
- Family: Opecoelidae
- Genus: Orthodena; Durio & Manter, 1968

Genus of flukes

Orthodena is a genus of trematodes in the family Opecoelidae. It consists of one species, Orthodena tropica Durio & Manter, 1968.
