= Caudotestis skrjabini =

Scientific classification
- Kingdom: Animalia
- Phylum: Platyhelminthes
- Class: Trematoda
- Order: Plagiorchiida
- Family: Opecoelidae
- Genus: Caudotestis
- Species: C. skrjabini

Binomial name
- Caudotestis skrjabini (Koval in Markevich, 1951)

Synonyms
- Plagioporus skrjabini Koval in Markevich, 1951

Species of fluke

Caudotestis skrjabini is a species of a trematode in the family Opecoelidae.

== Hosts ==
Hosts of Caudotestis skrjabini include:

- Snail Theodoxus fluviatilis serves as the first intermediate host
- Sand hoppers are natural additional hosts: Pontogammarus robustoides, Pontogammarus crassus, Dikerogammarus villosus, Dikerogammarus haemobaphes, Chaetogammarus ischnus and Amathillina cristata.
- Definitive hosts are Cobitis taenia, and gobies: toad goby (Mesogobius batrachocephalus), bighead goby (Ponticola kessleri) and monkey goby (Neogobius fluviatilis).
