= Buticulotrema thermichthysi =

Scientific classification
- Kingdom: Animalia
- Phylum: Platyhelminthes
- Class: Trematoda
- Order: Plagiorchiida
- Family: Opecoelidae
- Genus: Buticulotrema
- Species: B. thermichthysi

Binomial name
- Buticulotrema thermichthysi Bray et al., 2014

Species of fluke

Buticulotrema thermichthysi is a species of trematodes inhabiting hydrothermal vent fishes (particularly Thermichthys hollisi) in the south eastern Pacific Ocean. It can be distinguished from its family by its symmetrical testicular configuration; its uterus passing between the testes. Furthermore, it can be differentiated from its cogenerate species by its long and strongly muscular oesophagus, that bifurcates dorsally to the posterior part of the animal's ventral sucker; its long and narrow pars prostatica and distal male duct, as well as its sinistral genital pore that can be found at the level of its pharynx.
