= Coitocaecum parvum =

Scientific classification
- Domain: Eukaryota
- Kingdom: Animalia
- Phylum: Platyhelminthes
- Class: Trematoda
- Order: Plagiorchiida
- Family: Opecoelidae
- Genus: Coitocaecum
- Species: C. parvum

Binomial name
- Coitocaecum parvum Crowcroft, 1945

Species of fluke

Coitocaecum parvum is a digeneic trematode or flatworm (Platyhelminthes) that is parasitic to the intestine of the common bully (Gobiomorphus cotidianus) or upland bully (G. breviceps). The common and upland bully are freshwater fish of New Zealand that C. parvum uses as its definitive host. C. parvum is a hermaphroditic freshwater trematode that can omit its definitive host and produce eggs by selfing or progenesis inside its amphipod second intermediate host.

== Life cycle ==
The life cycle of C. parvum begins when eggs are released into the water and hatch into free-swimming miracidia. The miracidia then penetrate the first intermediate host, Potamopyrgus antipodarum (the New Zealand mud snail), where they multiply and develop into sporocysts. Next, free-living cercariae are asexually produced from the sporocysts and shed by the snails. These shed cercarial larvae then penetrate the hemocoel of the second intermediate host, Paracalliope fluviatilis (amphipod) and encyst as metacercariae. At this stage, the metacercariae have two options: 1) to wait for the bully (the definitive host) to eat the amphipod or 2) to undergo selfing (progenesis).

C. parvum will take up residence in the bully intestine where it will mature and reproduce eggs sexually (if it finds a partner) or via self-fertilization (since trematodes are hermaphroditic). However, if the amphipod is not eaten, the C. parvum metacercariae mature within the amphipod where they produce viable eggs within the cyst in the hemocoel (body cavity). Eggs produced in this fashion remain enclosed in the cyst until the amphipod dies. After amphipod death, the eggs are released into the water where they hatch into miracidia and are infective to the snail. The process of maturing within the intermediate host and eliminating the need for the definitive host is known as progenesis.

=== Life cycle choice ===
The progenetic life cycle choice is dependent upon opportunities for transmission and the risk of dead-end transmission. The worm can use cues from the amphipod caused by the presence of the predatory definitive host to interrupt its growth cycle in wait to be eaten. However, under low amounts of stress cues from the amphipod, the worm responds by adopting the progenetic lifecycle.

Another factor involved in the choice of progenesis is the competition with other interspecies and intraspecies competition. In the case of interspecies coinfection, competition with Microphallus sp. (avian definitive host) favors progenesis in order to ensure C. parvum egg production. Intraspecies coinfection is when more than one C. parvum larvae infects the amphipod, and whoever reproduces faster is going to ensure passage of its genetic information.

=== Progenesis ===
The progenetic ability of C. parvum is evolutionarily advantageous for this trematode. While inbreeding or selfing is evolutionarily disadvantageous, because it decreases the ability for genetic diversity to adapt to new hosts, this worm utilizes progenesis for reproductive insurance. Since progenesis does not preclude future generations of cross-fertilization in the fish host, it is merely a means of avoiding dead-end hosts.

== Sources ==
- Kelly DW, Paterson RA, Townsend CR, Poulin R, Tompkins DM (2009). "Has the introduction of brown trout altered disease patterns in native New Zealand fish?". Freshwater Biology. 54: 1805–1818.
- Lagrue C, Waters JM, Poulin R, Keeney DB (2001). "Microsaterllite loci for the progenetic trematode, Coitocaecum parvum (Opecoelidae)". Molecular Ecology Notes. 7: 694–696.
- Lagrue C, Poulin R (2007). "Life cycle abbreviation in the trematode Coitocaecum parvum: can parasites adjust to variable conditions?". Journal of Evolutionary Biology. 20: 1189–1195.
- Lagrue C, Poulin R (2008). "Intra- and interspecific competition among helminth parasites: Effects on Coitocaecum parvum life history strategy, size and fecundity". International Journal for Parasitology. 38: 1435–1444.
- Lefebvre F, Fredensborg B, Armstrong A, Hansen E, Poulin R (2005). "Assortative pairing in the amphipod Paracalliope fluviatilis: a role for parasites?". Hydrobiologia. 545: 65–73.
