= Biospeedotrema jolliveti =

Scientific classification
- Kingdom: Animalia
- Phylum: Platyhelminthes
- Class: Trematoda
- Order: Plagiorchiida
- Family: Opecoelidae
- Genus: Biospeedotrema
- Species: B. jolliveti

Binomial name
- Biospeedotrema jolliveti Bray et al., 2014

Species of fluke

Biospeedotrema jolliveti is a species of trematodes inhabiting hydrothermal vent fishes (particularly Ventichthys biospeedoi) in the south eastern Pacific Ocean. It can be distinguished from its family by its symmetrical testicular configuration; its uterus passing between the testes. Furthermore, it can be differentiated by vitelline fields which extend slightly into its post-testicular region; its intestinal bifurcation is dorsal to its ventral sucker; its genital pore is somewhat submedian or median; its cirrus sac is short and the caeca are large and overlap the testes.
