= Biospeedotrema parajolliveti =

Scientific classification
- Kingdom: Animalia
- Phylum: Platyhelminthes
- Class: Trematoda
- Order: Plagiorchiida
- Family: Opecoelidae
- Genus: Biospeedotrema
- Species: B. parajolliveti

Binomial name
- Biospeedotrema parajolliveti Bray et al., 2014

Species of fluke

Biospeedotrema parajolliveti is a species of trematodes inhabiting hydrothermal vent fishes (particularly Thermichthys hollisi) in the south eastern Pacific Ocean. It can be distinguished from its family by its symmetrical testicular configuration; its uterus passing between the testes.
