= Helicometrinae =

Scientific classification
- Kingdom: Animalia
- Phylum: Platyhelminthes
- Class: Trematoda
- Order: Plagiorchiida
- Family: Opecoelidae
- Subfamily: Helicometrinae; Bray, Cribb, Littlewood & Waeschenbach, 2016

Subfamily of flukes

Helicometrinae is a subfamily of trematodes in the family Opecoelidae.

== Genera ==
- Helicometra Odhner, 1902
- Helicometrina Linton, 1910
- Neohelicometra Siddiqi & Cable, 1960
- Proneohelicometra Hassanine, 2006
