= Caudotestis ventichthysi =

Scientific classification
- Kingdom: Animalia
- Phylum: Platyhelminthes
- Class: Trematoda
- Order: Plagiorchiida
- Family: Opecoelidae
- Genus: Caudotestis
- Species: C. ventichthysi

Binomial name
- Caudotestis ventichthysi Bray et al., 2014

Species of fluke

Caudotestis ventichthysi is a species of trematodes inhabiting hydrothermal vent fishes (particularly Ventichthys biospeedoi) in the south eastern Pacific Ocean. It can be distinguished from its family by its symmetrical testicular configuration; its uterus passing between the testes. Furthermore, what differentiates it from its cogenerates is caecal length; cirrus sac length; its internal seminal vesicle's shape; vitelline extent and arrangement, as well as forebody length and egg-size.
