= Peracreadium =

Scientific classification
- Kingdom: Animalia
- Phylum: Platyhelminthes
- Class: Trematoda
- Order: Plagiorchiida
- Family: Opecoelidae
- Subfamily: Opistholebetinae
- Genus: Peracreadium; Nicoll, 1909

Genus of flukes

Peracreadium is a genus of trematodes in the family Opecoelidae. It is very similar to the related genus Cainocreadium Nicoll, 1909, and has been synonymised with the genera Anabathycreadium Salman & Srivastava, 1990, Indocreadium Salman & Srivastava, 1990, and Lebouria Nicoll, 1909.

== Species ==
- Peracreadium akenovae Cribb, Bray & Cutmore, 2013
- Peracreadium characis (Stossich, 1886) Bartoli, Gibson & Bray, 1989
- Peracreadium commune (Olsson, 1868) Nicoll, 1909
- Peracreadium genu (Rudolphi, 1819) Nicoll, 1909
- Peracreadium gibsoni Kornijchuk & Gaevskaya, 2001
- Peracreadium idoneum (Nicoll, 1909) Gibson & Bray, 1982
- Peracreadium kareii (Shen & Qiu, 1995) Cribb, 2005
- Peracreadium longicirrus (Salman & Srivastava, 1990) Cribb, 2005
- Peracreadium megaformis (Salman & Srivastava, 1990) Cribb, 2005
- Peracreadium mycteropercae (Sogandares-Bernal, 1959) Pritchard, 1966
