= Pseudopodocotyle =

Scientific classification
- Kingdom: Animalia
- Phylum: Platyhelminthes
- Class: Trematoda
- Order: Plagiorchiida
- Family: Opecoelidae
- Subfamily: Plagioporinae
- Genus: Pseudopodocotyle; Caballero Rodríguez, 1970
- Species: P. bravoae

Binomial name
- Pseudopodocotyle bravoae Caballero Rodríguez, 1970

Genus of flukes

Pseudopodocotyle is a genus of trematodes in the family Opecoelidae. It consists of one species, Pseudopodocotyle bravoae.
