= Bathycreadium =

Scientific classification
- Kingdom: Animalia
- Phylum: Platyhelminthes
- Class: Trematoda
- Order: Plagiorchiida
- Family: Opecoelidae
- Subfamily: Bathycreadiinae; Martin, Huston, Cutmore & Cribb, 2019
- Genus: Bathycreadium; Kabata, 1961

Genus of flukes

Bathycreadium is a genus of trematodes in the family Opecoelidae. It is the only genus in subfamily Bathycreadiinae.

== Species ==
- Bathycreadium biscayense Bray, 1973
- Bathycreadium brayi Pérez-del-Olmo, Dallarés, Carrassón & Kostadinova, 2014
- Bathycreadium elongata (Maillard, 1970) Bray, 1973
- Bathycreadium flexicollis Kabata, 1961
- Bathycreadium nanaflexicolle Dronen, Rubec & Underwood, 1977 emend. Pérez-del-Olmo, Dallarés, Carrassón & Kostadinova, 2014
