= Phyllotrema =

Scientific classification
- Kingdom: Animalia
- Phylum: Platyhelminthes
- Class: Trematoda
- Order: Plagiorchiida
- Family: Opecoelidae
- Subfamily: Plagioporinae
- Genus: Phyllotrema; Yamaguti, 1934

Genus of flukes

Phyllotrema is a genus of trematodes in the family Opecoelidae.

== Species ==
- Phyllotrema bicaudatum Yamaguti, 1934
- Phyllotrema guangxiense Li, Qiu & Liang, 1990
- Phyllotrema microrchis Jin, Zhang & Ji, 1979
- Phyllotrema quadricaudatum Gu & Shen, 1979
- Phyllotrema tetracaudatum Hussain, Rao & Shyamasundari, 1986
