= Shimazuia =

Scientific classification
- Kingdom: Animalia
- Phylum: Platyhelminthes
- Class: Trematoda
- Order: Plagiorchiida
- Family: Opecoelidae
- Subfamily: Pseudoplagioporinae
- Genus: Shimazuia; Cribb, 2005
- Species: S. lethrini

Binomial name
- Shimazuia lethrini (Yamaguti, 1938) Cribb, 2005

Genus of flukes

Shimazuia is a genus of trematodes in the family Opecoelidae. It consists of one species, Shimazuia lethrini.
