= Mesobathylebouria =

Scientific classification
- Kingdom: Animalia
- Phylum: Platyhelminthes
- Class: Trematoda
- Order: Plagiorchiida
- Family: Opecoelidae
- Genus: Mesobathylebouria; Martin, Huston, Cutmore & Cribb, 2018

Genus of flukes

Mesobathylebouria is a genus of trematodes in the family Opecoelidae.

== Species ==
- Mesobathylebouria acanthogobii (Yamaguti, 1951) Martin, Huston, Cutmore & Cribb, 2018
- Mesobathylebouria lanceolata (Price, 1934) Martin, Huston, Cutmore & Cribb, 2018
- Mesobathylebouria lobata (Yamaguti, 1934) Martin, Huston, Cutmore & Cribb, 2018
- Mesobathylebouria tinkerbellae (Thompson & Margolis, 1987) Martin, Huston, Cutmore & Cribb, 2018
- Mesobathylebouria tohei (Yamaguti, 1970) Martin, Huston, Cutmore & Cribb, 2018
