= Pseudoplagioporus =

Scientific classification
- Kingdom: Animalia
- Phylum: Platyhelminthes
- Class: Trematoda
- Order: Plagiorchiida
- Family: Opecoelidae
- Subfamily: Pseudoplagioporinae
- Genus: Pseudoplagioporus; Yamaguti, 1938

Genus of flukes

Pseudoplagioporus is a genus of trematodes in the family Opecoelidae.

== Species ==
- Pseudoplagioporus interruptus Durio & Manter, 1968
- Pseudoplagioporus lethrini Yamaguti, 1938
- Pseudoplagioporus microrchis Yamaguti, 1942
