= Pachycreadium =

Scientific classification
- Kingdom: Animalia
- Phylum: Platyhelminthes
- Class: Trematoda
- Order: Plagiorchiida
- Family: Opecoelidae
- Subfamily: Opistholebetinae
- Genus: Pachycreadium; Manter, 1954

Genus of flukes

Pachycreadium is a genus of trematodes in the family Opecoelidae.

== Species ==
- Pachycreadium angolense Aleshkina & Gaevskaya, 1985
- Pachycreadium carnosum (Rudolphi, 1819) Cortini & Ferretti, 1959
- Pachycreadium gastrocotylum (Manter, 1940) Manter, 1954
- Pachycreadium lerneri Sogandares-Bernal, 1959
- Pachycreadium lethrini Hassanine, 2006
