= Pedunculacetabulum =

Scientific classification
- Kingdom: Animalia
- Phylum: Platyhelminthes
- Class: Trematoda
- Order: Plagiorchiida
- Family: Opecoelidae
- Subfamily: Hamacreadiinae
- Genus: Pedunculacetabulum; Yamaguti, 1934

Genus of flukes

Pedunculacetabulum is a genus of trematodes in the family Opecoelidae.

== Species ==
- Pedunculacetabulum inopinipugnus Martin, Cutmore & Cribb, 2018
- Pedunculacetabulum manteri Nagaty, 1942
- Pedunculacetabulum opisthorchis Yamaguti, 1934
