= Neopecoelina =

Scientific classification
- Kingdom: Animalia
- Phylum: Platyhelminthes
- Class: Trematoda
- Order: Plagiorchiida
- Family: Opecoelidae
- Subfamily: Plagioporinae
- Genus: Neopecoelina; Gupta, 1955

Genus of flukes

Neopecoelina is a genus of trematodes in the family Opecoelidae.

== Species ==
- Neopecoelina cavasiusi (Gupta, 1955) Yamaguti, 1958
- Neopecoelina saharanpurensis Gupta, 1955
