= Abyssopedunculus =

Scientific classification
- Kingdom: Animalia
- Phylum: Platyhelminthes
- Class: Trematoda
- Order: Plagiorchiida
- Family: Opecoelidae
- Genus: Abyssopedunculus; Martin, Huston, Cutmore & Cribb, 2018
- Species: A. brevis

Binomial name
- Abyssopedunculus brevis (Andres & Overstreet, 2013) Martin, Huston, Cutmore & Cribb, 2018

Genus of flukes

Abyssopedunculus is a genus of trematodes in the family Opecoelidae. It consists of one species, Abyssopedunculus brevis.
