= Anomalotrema =

Scientific classification
- Kingdom: Animalia
- Phylum: Platyhelminthes
- Class: Trematoda
- Order: Plagiorchiida
- Family: Opecoelidae
- Subfamily: Opecoelinae
- Genus: Anomalotrema; Zhukov, 1957

Genus of flukes

Anomalotrema is a genus of trematodes in the family Opecoelidae.

== Species ==
- Anomalotrema koiae Gibson & Bray, 1984
- Anomalotrema putjatini Zhukov, 1957
