= Choerodonicola =

Scientific classification
- Kingdom: Animalia
- Phylum: Platyhelminthes
- Class: Trematoda
- Order: Plagiorchiida
- Family: Opecoelidae
- Subfamily: Plagioporinae
- Genus: Choerodonicola; Cribb, 2005

Genus of flukes

Choerodonicola is a genus of trematodes in the family Opecoelidae.

== Species ==
- Choerodonicola calotomi (Yamaguti, 1934) [emend. Yamaguti, 1938] Cribb, 2005
- Choerodonicola choerodontis (Yamaguti, 1934) [emend. Yamguti, 1938 [emend. Kuramochi, 2006] Cribb, 2005
- Choerodonicola pacificus (Yamaguti, 1938) Cribb, 2005
- Choerodonicola renko Machida, 2014
