= Eucreadium =

Scientific classification
- Kingdom: Animalia
- Phylum: Platyhelminthes
- Class: Trematoda
- Order: Plagiorchiida
- Family: Opecoelidae
- Subfamily: Plagioporinae
- Genus: Eucreadium; Dayal, 1942

Genus of flukes

Eucreadium is a genus of trematodes in the family Opecoelidae.

== Species ==
- Eucreadium cameronii Gupta, 1963
- Eucreadium daccai Bashirullah & Elahi, 1972
- Eucreadium eutropiichthyius Dayal, 1942
- Eucreadium gangi Pandey, 1970
- Eucreadium hemlatae Gupta & Govind, 1983
- Eucreadium jhingrani Srivastava & Singh, 1967
- Eucreadium kulpaharensis Agarwal & Agrawal, 1985
- Eucreadium pandeyi Srivastava, Saxena & Kumar, 1983
- Eucreadium thapari Agarwal & Kumar, 1980
- Eucreadium varanasi Agarwal & Varma, 1972
