= Dimerosaccus =

Scientific classification
- Kingdom: Animalia
- Phylum: Platyhelminthes
- Class: Trematoda
- Order: Plagiorchiida
- Family: Opecoelidae
- Subfamily: Opecoelinae
- Genus: Dimerosaccus; Shimazu, 1980
- Species: D. oncorhynchi

Binomial name
- Dimerosaccus oncorhynchi (Eguchi, 1931) Shimazu, 1980

Genus of flukes

Dimerosaccus is a genus of trematodes in the family Opecoelidae. It consists of only one species, Dimerosaccus oncorhynchi. It has been synonymised with Allocreadium oncorhynchi Eguchi, 1931, Plagioporus honshuensis Moravec & Nagasawa, 1998, and P. oncorhynchi (Eguchi, 1931) Peters, 1957.
