= Opecoelina =

Scientific classification
- Kingdom: Animalia
- Phylum: Platyhelminthes
- Class: Trematoda
- Order: Plagiorchiida
- Family: Opecoelidae
- Subfamily: Opecoelininae
- Genus: Opecoelina; Manter, 1934

Genus of flukes

Opecoelina is a genus of trematodes in the family Opecoelidae.

== Species ==
- Opecoelina dewegeri Mago Guevara & Chinchilla Martínez, 2003
- Opecoelina helicoleni Manter, 1934
- Opecoelina pacifica Manter, 1940
- Opecoelina scorpaenae Manter, 1934
