= Genitocotyle =

Scientific classification
- Kingdom: Animalia
- Phylum: Platyhelminthes
- Class: Trematoda
- Order: Plagiorchiida
- Family: Opecoelidae
- Subfamily: Opecoelinae
- Genus: Genitocotyle; Park, 1937

Genus of flukes

Genitocotyle is a genus of trematodes in the family Opecoelidae. The species of Genitocotyle are endoparasitic in certain marine fishes.

== Species ==
- Genitocotyle acirrus Park, 1937
- Genitocotyle atlantica Manter, 1947
- Genitocotyle cablei Nahhas & Short, 1965
- Genitocotyle heterostichi Montgomery, 1957
- Genitocotyle mediterranea Bartoli, Gibson & Riutort, 1994
- Genitocotyle necromnemos Zedam, Bouguerche & Tazerouti, 2025
