= Pacificreadium =

Scientific classification
- Kingdom: Animalia
- Phylum: Platyhelminthes
- Class: Trematoda
- Order: Plagiorchiida
- Family: Opecoelidae
- Genus: Pacificreadium; Durio & Manter, 1968
- Species: P. serrani

Binomial name
- Pacificreadium serrani (Nagaty & Abdel-Aal, 1962) Durio & Manter, 1968

Genus of flukes

Pacificreadium is a genus of trematodes in the family Opecoelidae. It consists of one species, Pacificreadium serrani.
