= Sphaerostoma =

Scientific classification
- Kingdom: Animalia
- Phylum: Platyhelminthes
- Class: Trematoda
- Order: Plagiorchiida
- Family: Opecoelidae
- Genus: Sphaerostoma; Rudolphi, 1809

Synonyms
- Sphaerostomum Looss, 1899

Genus of flukes

Sphaerostoma is a genus of trematodes in the family Opecoelidae. It consists of one species, Sphaerostoma bramae (Müller, 1776).
