= Anthochoanocotyle =

Scientific classification
- Kingdom: Animalia
- Phylum: Platyhelminthes
- Class: Trematoda
- Order: Plagiorchiida
- Family: Opecoelidae
- Subfamily: Plagioporinae
- Genus: Anthochoanocotyle; Kamegai, 1972
- Species: A. kihobo

Binomial name
- Anthochoanocotyle kihobo Kamegai, 1972

Genus of flukes

Anthochoanocotyle is a genus of trematodes in the family Opecoelidae. It consists of one species, Anthochoanocotyle kihobo.
