= Pseudurorchis =

Scientific classification
- Kingdom: Animalia
- Phylum: Platyhelminthes
- Class: Trematoda
- Order: Plagiorchiida
- Family: Opecoelidae
- Subfamily: Plagioporinae
- Genus: Pseudurorchis; Yamaguti, 1971

Genus of flukes

Pseudurorchis is a genus of trematodes in the family Opecoelidae.

== Species ==
- Pseudurorchis aphanii (Paperna, 1964) Yamaguti, 1971
- Pseudurorchis catostomi Schell, 1974
- Pseudurorchis lacustris (Paperna, 1964) Yamaguti, 1971
