= Neoplagioporus =

Scientific classification
- Kingdom: Animalia
- Phylum: Platyhelminthes
- Class: Trematoda
- Order: Plagiorchiida
- Family: Opecoelidae
- Subfamily: Plagioporinae
- Genus: Neoplagioporus; Shimazu, 1990

Genus of flukes

Neoplagioporus is a genus of trematodes in the family Opecoelidae.

== Species ==
- Neoplagioporus ayu (Takahashi, 1928) Shimazu, 1990
- Neoplagioporus elongatus (Goto & Ozaki, 1930) [emend. Gibson, 1976] Shimazu, 1990
- Neoplagioporus kajika Urabe & Higa, 2006
- Neoplagioporus zacconis (Yamaguti, 1934) Shimazu, 1990
