= Magnaosimum =

Scientific classification
- Kingdom: Animalia
- Phylum: Platyhelminthes
- Class: Trematoda
- Order: Plagiorchiida
- Family: Opecoelidae
- Subfamily: Opistholebetinae
- Genus: Magnaosimum; Martin, Crouch, Cutmore & Cribb, 2018
- Species: M. brooksae

Binomial name
- Magnaosimum brooksae Martin, Crouch, Cutmore & Cribb, 2018

Genus of flukes

Magnaosimum is a genus of trematodes in the family Opecoelidae. It consists of one species, Magnaosimum brooksae.
