= Trilobovarium =

Scientific classification
- Kingdom: Animalia
- Phylum: Platyhelminthes
- Class: Trematoda
- Order: Plagiorchiida
- Family: Opecoelidae
- Subfamily: Plagioporinae
- Genus: Trilobovarium; Martin, Cutmore & Cribb, 2017

Genus of flukes

Trilobovarium is a genus of trematodes in the family Opecoelidae.

== Species ==
- Trilobovarium diacopae (Nagaty & Abdel Aal, 1962) Martin, Cutmore & Cribb, 2017
- Trilobovarium ira (Yamaguti, 1940) Martin, Cutmore & Cribb, 2017
- Trilobovarium khalili (Ramadan, 1983) Martin, Cutmore & Cribb, 2017
- Trilobovarium krusadaiense (Gupta, 1956) Martin, Cutmore & Cribb, 2017
- Trilobovarium lineatum (Aken'Ova & Cribb, 2001) Martin, Cutmore & Cribb, 2017
- Trilobovarium moretonense (Aken'Ova & Cribb, 2001) Martin, Cutmore & Cribb, 2017
- Trilobovarium palauense (Machida, 2004) Martin, Cutmore & Cribb, 2017
- Trilobovarium parvvatis Martin, Cutmore & Cribb, 2017
- Trilobovarium truncatum (Linton, 1940) Martin, Cutmore & Cribb, 2017
