= Diplobulbus =

Scientific classification
- Kingdom: Animalia
- Phylum: Platyhelminthes
- Class: Trematoda
- Order: Plagiorchiida
- Family: Opecoelidae
- Subfamily: Plagioporinae
- Genus: Diplobulbus; Yamaguti, 1934

Genus of flukes

Diplobulbus is a genus of trematodes in the family Opecoelidae.

== Species ==
- Diplobulbus brayi Aken'Ova & Cribb, 2000
- Diplobulbus callyodontis Yamaguti, 1942
- Diplobulbus calotomi Yamaguti, 1934
- Diplobulbus cheilini Machida, 2004
- Diplobulbus minutus Pritchard, 1966
- Diplobulbus scari Yamaguti, 1952
- Diplobulbus thalassomatis (Yamaguti, 1942) Cribb, 2005
