= Biospeedotrema =

Scientific classification
- Kingdom: Animalia
- Phylum: Platyhelminthes
- Class: Trematoda
- Order: Plagiorchiida
- Family: Opecoelidae
- Genus: Biospeedotrema; Bray, Waeschenbach, Dyal, Littlewood & Morand, 2014

Genus of flukes

Biospeedotrema is a genus of trematodes in the family Opecoelidae.

== Species ==
- Biospeedotrema biospeedoi Bray, Waeschenbach, Dyal, Littlewood & Morand, 2014
- Biospeedotrema jolliveti Bray, Waeschenbach, Dyal, Littlewood & Morand, 2014
- Biospeedotrema parajolliveti Bray, Waeschenbach, Dyal, Littlewood & Morand, 2014
