= Heterochoanostoma =

Scientific classification
- Kingdom: Animalia
- Phylum: Platyhelminthes
- Class: Trematoda
- Order: Plagiorchiida
- Family: Opecoelidae
- Subfamily: Plagioporinae
- Genus: Heterochoanostoma; Machida, 2014
- Species: H. shirodai

Binomial name
- Heterochoanostoma shirodai Machida, 2014

Genus of flukes

Heterochoanostoma is a genus of trematodes in the family Opecoelidae. It consists of one species, Heterochoanostoma shirodai.
