= Coitocaecum =

Scientific classification
- Kingdom: Animalia
- Phylum: Platyhelminthes
- Class: Trematoda
- Order: Plagiorchiida
- Family: Opecoelidae
- Subfamily: Opecoelinae
- Genus: Coitocaecum; Nicoll, 1915

Genus of flukes

Coitocaecum is a genus of trematodes in the family Opecoelidae. It has been synonymised to Ozakia Wisniewski, 1934, Paradactylostomum Zhukov, 1972 nec Toman, 1992, and Pseudocoitocaecum Bilqees, 1972.

== Species ==
- Coitocaecum anaspidis Hickman, 1934
- Coitocaecum austrosinicum Ding, 1993
- Coitocaecum banneri Martin, 1960
- Coitocaecum bengalense (Madhavi, Narasimhulu & Shameem, 1986)
- Coitocaecum bombayense (Ahmad, 1984) Bray, 1987
- Coitocaecum cadenati Dollfus, 1960
- Coitocaecum callyodontis Yamaguti, 1942
- Coitocaecum capense Bray, 1987
- Coitocaecum chaetodoni Ahmad, 1984
- Coitocaecum diplobulbosum Ozaki, 1929
- Coitocaecum gerris (Shen, 1990) Liu, Peng, Gao, Fu, Wu, Lu, Gao & Xiao, 2010
- Coitocaecum gymnophallum Nicoll, 1915
- Coitocaecum indicum Ahmad, 1980
- Coitocaecum kuhliae Machida, 2014
- Coitocaecum lateolabracis (Shen & Qiu, 1995) Liu, Peng, Gao, Fu, Wu, Lu, Gao & Xiao, 2010
- Coitocaecum latum Ozaki, 1929
- Coitocaecum leptoscari Yamaguti, 1940
- Coitocaecum manteri Ahmad, 1980
- Coitocaecum manteri Parukhin, 1971
- Coitocaecum michaeli Aken'Ova & Cribb, 1996
- Coitocaecum minutum (Pritchard, 1966) Yamaguti, 1971
- Coitocaecum muraenesocis Wang, Wang & Zhang, 1992
- Coitocaecum norae Martin, 1960
- Coitocaecum orientalis Dwivedi, 1978
- Coitocaecum orthorchis Ozaki, 1926
- Coitocaecum palaoense Ogata, 1942
- Coitocaecum parvum Crowcroft, 1945
- Coitocaecum pfluegeri (Yamaguti, 1970)
- Coitocaecum plagiorchis Ozaki, 1926
- Coitocaecum proavitum Wisniewski, 1933
- Coitocaecum scombri Ahmad, 1980
- Coitocaecum sigani Shen, 1990
- Coitocaecum sillaginis (Shen, 1986) Liu, Peng, Gao, Fu, Wu, Lu, Gao & Xiao, 2010
- Coitocaecum testiobliquum Wisniewski, 1933
- Coitocaecum thapari Ahmad, 1980
- Coitocaecum thrissoclesis (Bilqees, 1972) Bray, 1987
- Coitocaecum tropicum Manter, 1940
- Coitocaecum tylogonium Manter, 1954
- Coitocaecum unibulbosum Ozaki, 1929
- Coitocaecum xesuri Yamaguti, 1940
- Coitocaecum zealandicum Hine, 1977

== Species later synonymised with species of Coitocaecum ==
- Coitocaecum bengalense (Madhavi, Narasimhulu & Shameem, 1986)
  - Paradactylostomum bengalense Madhavi, Narasimhulu & Shameem, 1986
- Coitocaecum bombayense (Ahmad, 1984) Bray, 1987
  - Pseudocoitocaecum bombayensis Ahmad, 1984
- Coitocaecum callyodontis Yamaguti, 1942
  - Ozakia callyodontis (Yamaguti, 1942) Yamaguti, 1971
- Coitocaecum diplobulbosum Ozaki, 1929
  - Ozakia diplobulbosa (Ozaki, 1929) Wisniewski, 1933
- Coitocaecum gerris (Shen, 1990) Liu, Peng, Gao, Fu, Wu, Lu, Gao & Xiao, 2010
  - Ozakia gerris Shen, 1990
- Coitocaecum gymnophallum Nicoll, 1915
  - Coitocaecum glandulosum Yamaguti, 1934
  - Coitocaecum robustum Wang, 1984
- Coitocaecum lateolabracis (Shen & Qiu, 1995) Liu, Peng, Gao, Fu, Wu, Lu, Gao & Xiao, 2010
  - Ozakia latelabracis Shen & Qiu, 1995
  - Ozakia lateolabracis Shen & Qiu, 1995
- Coitocaecum latum Ozaki, 1929
  - Ozakia lata (Ozaki, 1929) Wisniewski, 1933
- Coitocaecum minutum (Pritchard, 1966) Yamaguti, 1971
  - Nicolla minuta Pritchard, 1966
- Coitocaecum orthorchis Ozaki, 1926
  - Ozakia orthorchis (Ozaki, 1926) Wisniewski, 1933
- Coitocaecum pfluegeri (Yamaguti, 1970)
  - Ozakia pfluegeri Yamaguti, 1970
- Coitocaecum proavitum Wisniewski, 1933
  - Excoitocaecum proavitum (Wisniewski, 1933) Slusarski, 1958
- Coitocaecum sillaginis (Shen, 1986) Liu, Peng, Gao, Fu, Wu, Lu, Gao & Xiao, 2010
  - Ozakia sillaginis Shen, 1986
- Coitocaecum testiobliquum Wisniewski, 1933
  - Excoitocaecum testiobliquum (Wisniewski, 1933) Slusarski, 1958
- Coitocaecum thrissoclesis (Bilqees, 1972) Bray, 1987
  - Paradactylostomum indicum Zhukov, 1972
  - Pseudocoitocaecum thrissoclesis Bilqees, 1972
- Coitocaecum unibulbosum Ozaki, 1929
  - Ozakia unibulbosa (Ozaki, 1929) Wisniewski, 1933
