= Discoverytrema =

Scientific classification
- Kingdom: Animalia
- Phylum: Platyhelminthes
- Class: Trematoda
- Order: Plagiorchiida
- Family: Opecoelidae
- Subfamily: Opecoelinae
- Genus: Discoverytrema; Gibson, 1976

Genus of flukes

Discoverytrema is a genus of trematodes in the family Opecoelidae. K. Zdzitowiecki described both species of Discoverytrema as being endoparasitic in the Antarctic gadiform fish Muraenolepis microps Lönnberg, 1905, which are found to the south of the British South Georgia Island.

== Species ==
- Discoverytrema gibsoni Zdzitowiecki, 1990
- Discoverytrema markowskii Gibson, 1976
