= Pseudosphaerostomum =

Scientific classification
- Kingdom: Animalia
- Phylum: Platyhelminthes
- Class: Trematoda
- Order: Plagiorchiida
- Family: Opecoelidae
- Subfamily: Plagioporinae
- Genus: Pseudosphaerostomum; Koval & Shevchenko, 1970
- Species: P. caudotestis

Binomial name
- Pseudosphaerostomum caudotestis Koval & Shevchenko, 1970

Genus of flukes

Pseudosphaerostomum is a genus of trematodes in the family Opecoelidae. It consists of one species, Pseudosphaerostomum caudotestis.
