= Hysterogonia =

Scientific classification
- Kingdom: Animalia
- Phylum: Platyhelminthes
- Class: Trematoda
- Order: Plagiorchiida
- Family: Opecoelidae
- Subfamily: Plagioporinae
- Genus: Hysterogonia; Hanson, 1955

Genus of flukes

Hysterogonia is a genus of trematodes in the family Opecoelidae.

== Species ==
- Hysterogonia balistis Hanson, 1955
- Hysterogonia bychowskii Korotaeva, 1972
