= Parvacreadium =

Scientific classification
- Kingdom: Animalia
- Phylum: Platyhelminthes
- Class: Trematoda
- Order: Plagiorchiida
- Family: Opecoelidae
- Subfamily: Opecoelinae
- Genus: Parvacreadium; Manter, 1940
- Species: P. bifidum

Binomial name
- Parvacreadium bifidum Manter, 1940

Genus of flukes

Parvacreadium is a genus of trematodes in the family Opecoelidae, consisting of a single species, Parvacreadium bifidum.
