= Halosaurotrema =

Scientific classification
- Kingdom: Animalia
- Phylum: Platyhelminthes
- Class: Trematoda
- Order: Plagiorchiida
- Family: Opecoelidae
- Subfamily: Podocotylinae
- Genus: Halosaurotrema; Martin, Huston, Cutmore & Cribb, 2018
- Species: H. halosauropsi

Binomial name
- Halosaurotrema halosauropsi (Bray & Campbell, 1996) Martin, Huston, Cutmore & Cribb, 2018

Genus of flukes

Halosaurotrema is a genus of trematodes in the family Opecoelidae. It consists of one species, Halosaurotrema halosauropsi.
