= Anisoporus =

Scientific classification
- Kingdom: Animalia
- Phylum: Platyhelminthes
- Class: Trematoda
- Order: Plagiorchiida
- Family: Opecoelidae
- Subfamily: Opecoelinae
- Genus: Anisoporus; Ozaki, 1928

Genus of flukes

Anisoporus is a genus of trematodes in the family Opecoelidae.

== Species ==
- Anisoporus cobraeformis Ozaki, 1928
- Anisoporus orientalis Madhavi, 1975

== Former species ==
Some species formerly in Anisoporus have been synonymised to other genera. They are:

- Anisoporus eucinostomi Manter, 1940, synonymised to Opecoeloides eucinostomi (Manter, 1940) von Wicklen, 1946
- Anisoporus manteri Hunninen & Cable, 1940, synonymised to Opecoeloides manteri (Hunninen & Cable, 1940) Hunninen & Cable, 1941
- Anisoporus thyrinopsi Manter, 1940, synonymised to Opecoeloides thyrinopsi (Manter, 1940) Skrjabin & Petrov, 1958
