= Pycnadenoides =

Scientific classification
- Kingdom: Animalia
- Phylum: Platyhelminthes
- Class: Trematoda
- Order: Plagiorchiida
- Family: Opecoelidae
- Subfamily: Opistholebetinae
- Genus: Pycnadenoides; Yamaguti, 1938

Genus of flukes

Pycnadenoides is a genus of trematodes in the family Opecoelidae.

== Species ==
- Pycnadenoides calami Manter, 1947
- Pycnadenoides ghanensis Fischthal & Thomas, 1968
- Pycnadenoides invenustus Aken'Ova, 2003
- Pycnadenoides pagrosomi Yamaguti, 1938
- Pycnadenoides reversati Aken'Ova, 2003
- Pycnadenoides senegalensis Fischthal & Thomas, 1972
- Pycnadenoides umbrinae (Stossich, 1885) Gibson & Bray, 1988
