= Neopodocotyle =

Scientific classification
- Kingdom: Animalia
- Phylum: Platyhelminthes
- Class: Trematoda
- Order: Plagiorchiida
- Family: Opecoelidae
- Subfamily: Plagioporinae
- Genus: Neopodocotyle; Dayal, 1950

Genus of flukes

Neopodocotyle is a genus of trematodes in the family Opecoelidae.

== Species ==
- Neopodocotyle gorakhpurensis Agarwal & Kumar, 1986
- Neopodocotyle indica Dayal, 1950
- Neopodocotyle kulpaharensis Agarwal & Agarwal, 1980
- Neopodocotyle lucknowensis Gupta & Chakrabarti, 1967
- Neopodocotyle mehrai Rai, 1971
- Neopodocotyle spinipora Sircar & Sinha, 1969
