= Neonotoporus =

Scientific classification
- Kingdom: Animalia
- Phylum: Platyhelminthes
- Class: Trematoda
- Order: Plagiorchiida
- Family: Opecoelidae
- Subfamily: Stenakrinae
- Genus: Neonotoporus; Srivastava, 1942

Genus of flukes

Neonotoporus is a genus of trematodes in the family Opecoelidae.

== Species ==
- Neonotoporus carangis (Yamaguti, 1951)
- Neonotoporus decapteri Parukhin, 1966
- Neonotoporus gibsoni Ahmad, 1990
- Neonotoporus leiognathi (Hafeezullah, 1971) Ahmad, 1985
- Neonotoporus maruadsi Yamaguti, 1970
- Neonotoporus novaezelandicus Lebedev, 1968
- Neonotoporus opelii Yamaguti, 1970
- Neonotoporus overstreeti Ahmad & Dhar, 1987
- Neonotoporus skrjabini Ahmad, 1987
- Neonotoporus srivastavai Ahmad & Dhar, 1987
- Neonotoporus trachuri (Yamaguti, 1938) Srivastava, 1942
- Neonotoporus yamagutii Manter, 1947
