= Opecoelus =

Scientific classification
- Kingdom: Animalia
- Phylum: Platyhelminthes
- Class: Trematoda
- Order: Plagiorchiida
- Family: Opecoelidae
- Subfamily: Opecoelinae
- Genus: Opecoelus; Ozaki, 1925

Genus of flukes

Opecoelus is a genus of trematodes in the family Opecoelidae.

== Species ==
- Opecoelus adsphaericus Manter & Van Cleave, 1951
- Opecoelus arii Wang, 1982
- Opecoelus atlanticus Zhukov, 1983
- Opecoelus beliyai (Pande, 1937) Aken'Ova, 2007
- Opecoelus bohaiensis Li, Qiu & Zhang, 1988
- Opecoelus caballeroi Caballero Rodríguez, 1977
- Opecoelus cameroni (Caballero y Caballero & Caballero Rodríguez, 1969) Aken'Ova, 2007
- Opecoelus caulopsettae (Manter, 1954) Aken'Ova, 2007
- Opecoelus crowcrofti Aken'Ova, 2007
- Opecoelus goniistii Yamaguti, 1938
- Opecoelus gonorhynchi (Gavrilyuk-Tkachuk, 1979) Aken'Ova, 2007
- Opecoelus haduyngoi Nguyễn, 2012
- Opecoelus himezi Yamaguti, 1952
- Opecoelus inimici Yamaguti, 1934
- Opecoelus jamunicus (Srivastava, 1968) Aken'Ova, 2007
- Opecoelus kuhliae Yamaguti, 1970
- Opecoelus lateolabracis Yamaguti, 1958
- Opecoelus lobatus Ozaki, 1925
- Opecoelus lotellae Manter, 1954
- Opecoelus mastacembalii (Harshey, 1937) Aken'Ova, 2007
- Opecoelus mehrii (Harshey, 1937) Aken'Ova, 2007
- Opecoelus mexicanus Manter, 1940
- Opecoelus minimus Tubangui, 1928
- Opecoelus minor Yamaguti, 1934
- Opecoelus mulloidichthydis Yamaguti, 1970
- Opecoelus mutu Yamaguti, 1940
- Opecoelus nipponicus Yamaguti, 1951
- Opecoelus noblei Banerjee, 1965
- Opecoelus ozaki (Layman, 1930) Yamaguti, 1954
- Opecoelus pacificus Caballero y Caballero & Caballero Rodríguez, 1976
- Opecoelus pagrosomi Yamaguti, 1958
- Opecoelus pentedactylus (Manter, 1940) Aken'Ova, 2007
- Opecoelus piriformis Yamaguti, 1952
- Opecoelus platycephali Yamaguti, 1970
- Opecoelus pomatomi Aken'Ova, 2007
- Opecoelus pteroisi Shen, 1986
- Opecoelus quadratus Ozaki, 1928
- Opecoelus rhadinotus Manter, 1963
- Opecoelus scorpaenidicola Prudhoe & Bray, 1973
- Opecoelus sebastisci Yamaguti, 1958
- Opecoelus sebastodis Yamaguti, 1934
- Opecoelus sphæricus Ozaki, 1925
- Opecoelus tasmanicus Crowcroft, 1947
- Opecoelus ukigori Shimazu, 1988
- Opecoelus variabilis Cribb, 1985
- Opecoelus woolcockae Aken'Ova, 2007
- Opecoelus xenistii Manter, 1940
- Opecoelus zhifuensis Shen & Qiu, 1995

== Species later synonymised with species of Opecoelus ==
- Opecoelus beliyai (Pande, 1937) Aken'Ova, 2007
  - Opegaster beliyai Pande, 1937
- Opecoelus cameroni (Caballero y Caballero & Caballero Rodríguez, 1969) Aken'Ova, 2007
  - Opegaster cameroni Caballero y Caballero & Caballero Rodríguez, 1969
- Opecoelus caulopsettae (Manter, 1954) Aken'Ova, 2007
  - Opegaster caulopsettae Manter, 1954
- Opecoelus gonorhynchi (Gavrilyuk-Tkachuk, 1979) Aken'Ova, 2007
  - Opegaster gonorhynchi Gavrilyuk-Tkachuk, 1979
- Opecoelus jamunicus (Srivastava, 1968) Aken'Ova, 2007
  - Opegaster jamunicus Srivastava, 1968
- Opecoelus mastacembalii (Harshey, 1937) Aken'Ova, 2007
  - Opegaster mastacembalii Harshey, 1937
- Opecoelus mehrii (Harshey, 1937) Aken'Ova, 2007
  - Opegaster mehrii Harshey, 1937
- Opecoelus mexicanus Manter, 1940
  - Podocotyle boneti Caballero y Caballero & Caballero Rodríguez, 1970
- Opecoelus ozaki (Layman, 1930) Yamaguti, 1954
  - Opegaster ozaki Layman, 1930
- Opecoelus pentedactylus (Manter, 1940) Aken'Ova, 2007
  - Opegaster pentedactylus Manter, 1940
