= Opegaster =

Scientific classification
- Kingdom: Animalia
- Phylum: Platyhelminthes
- Class: Trematoda
- Order: Plagiorchiida
- Family: Opecoelidae
- Subfamily: Opecoelinae
- Genus: Opegaster; Ozaki, 1928

Genus of flukes

Opegaster is a genus of trematodes in the family Opecoelidae.

== Species ==
- Opegaster acuta Manter, 1940
- Opegaster alykhani Bilqees, Hadi, Khatoon, Muti-ur-Rehman, Perveen & Haseeb, 2009
- Opegaster anguilli Harshey, 1933
- Opegaster apogonichthydis Yamaguti, 1938
- Opegaster beliyai Pande, 1937
- Opegaster bothi Yamaguti, 1970
- Opegaster brevifistula Ozaki, 1928
- Opegaster cameroni Caballero y Caballero & Caballero Rodríguez, 1969
- Opegaster caulopsettae Manter, 1954
- Opegaster cryptocentri Yamaguti, 1958
- Opegaster dactylopteri Yamaguti, 1970
- Opegaster dendrochiri Yamaguti, 1970
- Opegaster dermatogenyos Yamaguti, 1970
- Opegaster ditrematis Yamaguti, 1942
- Opegaster elongata Yamaguti, 1959
- Opegaster gobii Yamaguti, 1952
- Opegaster gonorhynchi Gavrilyuk-Tkachuk, 1979
- Opegaster hawaiiensis Yamaguti, 1970
- Opegaster hippocampi Shen, 1982
- Opegaster iniistii Yamaguti, 1970
- Opegaster lobulus Wang, 1977
- Opegaster longivesicula Yamaguti, 1952
- Opegaster lutiani Bravo-Hollis & Manter, 1957
- Opegaster macrorchis Yamaguti, 1938
- Opegaster mastacembalii Harshey, 1937
- Opegaster mehrii Harshey, 1937
- Opegaster oplegnathi Wang, Wang & Zhang, 1992
- Opegaster ouemoensis Bray & Justine, 2013
- Opegaster ovatus Ozaki, 1928
- Opegaster paramacrorchis Hafeezullah, 1971
- Opegaster parapristipomatis Yamaguti, 1934
- Opegaster plotosi Yamaguti, 1940
- Opegaster pritchardae Overstreet, 1969
- Opegaster queenslandicus (Aken'Ova, 2007) Bray & Justine, 2013
- Opegaster rectus Ozaki, 1928
- Opegaster syngnathi Yamaguti, 1934
- Opegaster synodi Manter, 1947
- Opegaster tamori Yamaguti, 1938
