= Bartoliella =

Scientific classification
- Kingdom: Animalia
- Phylum: Platyhelminthes
- Class: Trematoda
- Order: Plagiorchiida
- Family: Opecoelidae
- Subfamily: Opecoelininae
- Genus: Bartoliella; Aken'Ova, 2003
- Species: B. pritchardae

Binomial name
- Bartoliella pritchardae Aken'Ova, 2003

Genus of flukes

Bartoliella is a genus of trematodes in the family Opecoelidae. It consists of only one species, Bartoliella pritchardae.
