= Heterolebes =

Scientific classification
- Kingdom: Animalia
- Phylum: Platyhelminthes
- Class: Trematoda
- Order: Plagiorchiida
- Family: Opecoelidae
- Subfamily: Opistholebetinae
- Genus: Heterolebes; Ozaki, 1935

Genus of flukes

Heterolebes is a genus of trematodes in the family Opecoelidae.

== Species ==
- Heterolebes buckleyi (Gupta, 1968) Cribb, 2005
- Heterolebes diodonti Parukhin, 1970
- Heterolebes dongshanensis Liu, 1999
- Heterolebes immaculosus Ku & Shen, 1965
- Heterolebes maculosus Ozaki, 1935
- Heterolebes sinensis Gu & Shen, 1979
- Heterolebes spindalis Gupta, 1968
- Heterolebes yamagutii Manter & Pritchard, 1962
