= Proneohelicometra =

Scientific classification
- Kingdom: Animalia
- Phylum: Platyhelminthes
- Class: Trematoda
- Order: Plagiorchiida
- Family: Opecoelidae
- Subfamily: Helicometrinae
- Genus: Proneohelicometra; Hassanine, 2006
- Species: P. aegyptensis

Binomial name
- Proneohelicometra aegyptensis Hassanine, 2006

Genus of flukes

Proneohelicometra is a genus of trematodes in the family Opecoelidae. It consists of one species, Proneohelicometra aegyptensis.
