= Thynstenopera =

Scientific classification
- Kingdom: Animalia
- Phylum: Platyhelminthes
- Class: Trematoda
- Order: Plagiorchiida
- Family: Opecoelidae
- Genus: Thynstenopera; Bilqees & Khatoon, 2004

Genus of flukes

Thynstenopera is a genus of trematodes in the family Opecoelidae. It consists of one species, Thynstenopera lobata Bilqees & Khatoon, 2004.
