= Bathypodocotyle =

Scientific classification
- Kingdom: Animalia
- Phylum: Platyhelminthes
- Class: Trematoda
- Order: Plagiorchiida
- Family: Opecoelidae
- Subfamily: Podocotylinae
- Genus: Bathypodocotyle; Martin, Huston, Cutmore & Cribb, 2018

Genus of flukes

Bathypodocotyle is a genus of trematodes in the family Opecoelidae.

== Species ==
- Bathypodocotyle enkaimushi (Blend, Kuramochi & Dronen, 2015) Miller, Huston, Cutmore & Cribb, 2018
- Bathypodocotyle margolisi (Gibson, 1995) Martin, Huston, Cutmore & Cribb, 2018
