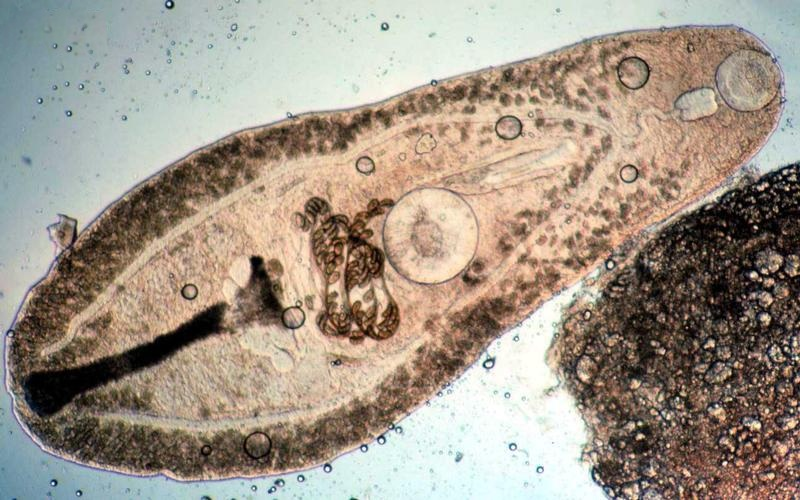
- Helicometra sp. (Plagiorchiida: Opecoelidae) from the intestine of a Flame Cardinal fish

Scientific classification
- Kingdom: Animalia
- Phylum: Platyhelminthes
- Class: Trematoda
- Order: Plagiorchiida
- Family: Opecoelidae
- Subfamily: Helicometrinae
- Genus: Helicometra; Odhner, 1902

= Helicometra =

Genus of flukes

Helicometra is a genus of trematodes in the class Opecoelidae. It is synonymous with Allostenopera Baeva, 1968, Metahelicometra Yamaguti, 1971, and Stenopera Manter, 1933. Its type species is H. fasciata (Rudolphi, 1819). They are distinguished by their unique spiral uterus, from which their name is derived.

== Species ==
- Helicometra aegyptensis Hassanine, 2007
- Helicometra antarcticae Holloway & Bier, 1968
- Helicometra aposinuata Pritchard, 1966
- Helicometra bassensis Woolcock, 1935
- Helicometra borneoensis Fischthal & Kuntz, 1965
- Helicometra boseli Nagaty, 1956
- Helicometra dalianensis (Li, Qiu & Zhang, 1989)
- Helicometra dorabi (Mamaev & Oshmarin, 1966)
- Helicometra equilata (Manter, 1933)
- Helicometra fasciata (Rudolphi, 1819)
- Helicometra filamentosa Madhavi, 1975
- Helicometra fusiformis Wang, Wang & Zhang, 1992
- Helicometra gibsoni Meenakshi, Madhavi & Swarnkumari, 1993
- Helicometra gomphosi Yamaguti, 1970
- Helicometra grandora Manter, 1954
- Helicometra hapalogenyos Wang, Wang & Zhang, 1992
- Helicometra indica Agrawal, 1964
- Helicometra insolita Polyanski, 1955
- Helicometra interrupta Hassanine, 2005
- Helicometra kyliotrema Pritchard, 1966
- Helicometra manteri Andres, Ray, Pulis, Curran & Overstreet, 2014
- Helicometra nasae Nagaty & Abdel-Aal, 1962
- Helicometra neoscorpaenae Wang, Wang & Zhang, 1992
- Helicometra overstreeti Blend & Dronen, 2015
- Helicometra pisanoae Zdzitowiecki, 1998
- Helicometra pisodonophi Há, 2012
- Helicometra pleurogrammi (Baeva, 1968)
- Helicometra plovmornini Issaitchikov, 1928
- Helicometra pteroisi (Gupta, 1956)
- Helicometra rakusai Zdzitowiecki, 1997
- Helicometra robinsorum Overstreet & Martin, 1974
- Helicometra scorpaenae Prudhoe & Bray, 1973
- Helicometra sebastis (Sekerak & Arai, 1974)
- Helicometra selaroides Shen, 1986
- Helicometra sinipercae Wang, 1982
- Helicometra sprenti Aken'Ova, Cribb & Bray, 2006
- Helicometra tenuifolia Woolcock, 1935
- Helicometra torta Linton, 1910

== Species later synonymised with species of Helicometra ==
- Helicometra antarcticae Holloway & Bier, 1968
  - Neohelicometra antarcticae (Holloway & Bier, 1968)
- Helicometra boseli Nagaty, 1956
  - Helicometra rectisaccus (Fischthal & Kuntz, 1964)
  - Stenopera rectisaccus Fischthal & Kuntz, 1964
- Helicometra dalianensis (Li, Qiu & Zhang, 1989)
  - Neohelicometra dalianensis Li, Qiu & Zhang, 1989
- Helicometra dorabi (Mamaev & Oshmarin, 1966)
  - Stenopera dorabi Mamaev & Oshmarin, 1966
- Helicometra equilata (Manter, 1933)
  - Stenopera equilata Manter, 1933
- Helicometra fasciata (Rudolphi, 1819)
  - Helicometra dochmosorchis Manter & Pritchard, 1960
  - Helicometra epinepheli Yamaguti, 1934
  - Helicometra flava Stossich, 1903
  - Helicometra gobii (Stossich, 1883)
  - Helicometra hypodytis Yamaguti, 1934
  - Helicometra labri (Stossich, 1886)
  - Helicometra markewitschi Pogorel'tseva, 1954
  - Helicometra marmoratae Nagaty & Abdel-Aal, 1962
  - Helicometra mutabilis (Stossich, 1902)
  - Helicometra pulchella (Rudolphi, 1819)
  - Helicometra scorpaenae Wang, 1982
  - Helicometra sinuata (Rudolphi, 1819)
  - Helicometra upapalu Yamaguti, 1970
- Helicometra insolita Polyanski, 1955
  - Neohelicometra insolita (Polyansky, 1955)
- Helicometra pisodonophi Nguyen Van Ha, 2012
  - Hamacreadium gymnomuraenae Shen & Li, 2000
- Helicometra pleurogrammi (Baeva, 1968)
  - Allostenopera pleurogrammi Baeva, 1968
  - Helicometra pugetensis Schell, 1973
  - Neohelicometra pleurogrammi (Baeva, 1968)
- Helicometra pteroisi (Gupta, 1956)
  - Stenopera pteroisi Gupta, 1956
- Helicometra sebastis (Sekerak & Arai, 1974)
  - Neohelicometra sebastis Sekerak & Arai, 1974
- Helicometra tenuifolia Woolcock, 1935
  - Helicometra neosebastodis Crowcroft, 1947
- Helicometra torta Linton, 1910
  - Helicometra pretiosa Bravo-Hollis & Manter, 1957
