= Neochoanostoma =

Scientific classification
- Kingdom: Animalia
- Phylum: Platyhelminthes
- Class: Trematoda
- Order: Plagiorchiida
- Family: Opecoelidae
- Subfamily: Plagioporinae
- Genus: Neochoanostoma; Bray & Cribb, 1989

Genus of flukes

Neochoanostoma is a genus of trematodes in the family Opecoelidae.

== Species ==
- Neochoanostoma avidabira Bray & Cribb, 1989
- Neochoanostoma bariadiva Bray & Cribb, 1989
- Neochoanostoma crassum Machida, 2014
