= Manteriella =

Scientific classification
- Kingdom: Animalia
- Phylum: Platyhelminthes
- Class: Trematoda
- Order: Plagiorchiida
- Family: Opecoelidae
- Subfamily: Opecoelinae
- Genus: Manteriella; Yamaguti, 1958

Genus of flukes

Manteriella is a genus of trematodes in the family Opecoelidae.

== Species ==
- Manteriella chanis Shen, 1986
- Manteriella crassa (Manter, 1947) Yamaguti, 1958
- Manteriella hainanensis Shen, 1990
- Manteriella yamagutii Ahmad, 1990

== Species later synonymised with species of Manteriella ==
- Manteriella crassa (Manter, 1947) Yamaguti, 1958
  - Horatrema crassum Manter, 1947
