= Urorchis =

Scientific classification
- Kingdom: Animalia
- Phylum: Platyhelminthes
- Class: Trematoda
- Order: Plagiorchiida
- Family: Opecoelidae
- Subfamily: Plagioporinae
- Genus: Urorchis; Ozaki, 1927

Genus of flukes

Urorchis is a genus of trematodes in the family Opecoelidae.

== Species ==
- Urorchis acheilognathi Yamaguti, 1934
- Urorchis goro Ozaki, 1927
- Urorchis imba Ishii, 1935
