= Fairfaxia =

Scientific classification
- Kingdom: Animalia
- Phylum: Platyhelminthes
- Class: Trematoda
- Order: Plagiorchiida
- Family: Opecoelidae
- Subfamily: Pseudoplagioporinae
- Genus: Fairfaxia; Cribb, 1989

Genus of flukes

Fairfaxia is a genus of trematodes in the family Opecoelidae.

== Species ==
- Fairfaxia cribbi Hassanine & Gibson, 2005
- Fairfaxia lethrini Cribb, 1989
