= Tellervotrema =

Scientific classification
- Kingdom: Animalia
- Phylum: Platyhelminthes
- Class: Trematoda
- Order: Plagiorchiida
- Family: Opecoelidae
- Subfamily: Podocotylinae
- Genus: Tellervotrema; Gibson & Bray, 1982

Genus of flukes

Tellervotrema is a genus of trematodes in the family Opecoelidae.

== Species ==
- Tellervotrema armstrongi Gibson & Bray, 1982
- Tellervotrema beringi (Mamaev, 1965) Gibson & Bray, 1982
- Tellervotrema katadara (Kuramochi, 2001) Kuramochi, 2009
