= Bentholebouria =

Scientific classification
- Kingdom: Animalia
- Phylum: Platyhelminthes
- Class: Trematoda
- Order: Plagiorchiida
- Family: Opecoelidae
- Subfamily: Hamacreadiinae
- Genus: Bentholebouria; Andres, Pulis & Overstreet, 2014

Genus of flukes

Bentholebouria is a genus of trematodes in the family Opecoelidae.

== Species ==
- Bentholebouria blatta (Bray & Justine, 2009) Andres, Pulis & Overstreet, 2014
- Bentholebouria colubrosa Andres, Pulis & Overstreet, 2014
- Bentholebouria longisaccula (Yamaguti, 1970) Andres, Pulis & Overstreet, 2014
- Bentholebouria rooseveltiae (Yamaguti, 1970) Andres, Pulis & Overstreet, 2014
- Bentholebouria ulaula (Yamaguti, 1970) Andres, Pulis & Overstreet, 2014
