= Pycnadena =

Scientific classification
- Kingdom: Animalia
- Phylum: Platyhelminthes
- Class: Trematoda
- Order: Plagiorchiida
- Family: Opecoelidae
- Subfamily: Opistholebetinae
- Genus: Pycnadena; Linton, 1911
- Species: P. lata

Binomial name
- Pycnadena lata (Linton, 1910) Linton, 1911

Genus of flukes

Pycnadena is a genus of trematodes in the family Opecoelidae. It consists of one species, Pycnadena lata.
