= Pseudopycnadena =

Scientific classification
- Kingdom: Animalia
- Phylum: Platyhelminthes
- Class: Trematoda
- Order: Plagiorchiida
- Family: Opecoelidae
- Subfamily: Opistholebetinae
- Genus: Pseudopycnadena; Saad-Fares & Maillard, 1986

Genus of flukes

Pseudopycnadena is a genus of trematodes in the family Opecoelidae.

== Species ==
- Pseudopycnadena fischthali Saad-Fares & Maillard, 1986
- Pseudopycnadena tendu Bray & Justine, 2007
