= Holsworthotrema =

Scientific classification
- Kingdom: Animalia
- Phylum: Platyhelminthes
- Class: Trematoda
- Order: Plagiorchiida
- Family: Opecoelidae
- Genus: Holsworthotrema; Martin, Huston, Cutmore & Cribb, 2018

Genus of flukes

Holsworthotrema is a genus of trematodes in the family Opecoelidae.

== Species ==
- Holsworthotrema chaoderma Martin, Huston, Cutmore & Cribb, 2018
- Holsworthotrema enboubalichthys Martin, Huston, Cutmore & Cribb, 2018
