= Gaevskajatrema =

Scientific classification
- Kingdom: Animalia
- Phylum: Platyhelminthes
- Class: Trematoda
- Order: Plagiorchiida
- Family: Opecoelidae
- Subfamily: Opistholebetinae
- Genus: Gaevskajatrema; Gibson & Bray, 1982

Genus of flukes

Gaevskajatrema is a genus of trematodes in the family Opecoelidae.

== Species ==
- Gaevskajatrema halosauropsi Bray & Campbell, 1996
- Gaevskajatrema perezi (Mathias, 1926) Gibson & Bray, 1982
- Gaevskajatrema pontica (Koval, 1966) Machkevsky, 1990
