= Pseudopecoelina =

Scientific classification
- Kingdom: Animalia
- Phylum: Platyhelminthes
- Class: Trematoda
- Order: Plagiorchiida
- Family: Opecoelidae
- Subfamily: Stenakrinae
- Genus: Pseudopecoelina; Yamaguti, 1942

Genus of flukes

Pseudopecoelina is a genus of trematodes in the family Opecoelidae.

== Species ==
- Pseudopecoelina chirocentrosus Shen, 1986
- Pseudopecoelina dampieriae Yamaguti, 1942
- Pseudopecoelina elongata Hafeezullah, 1971
- Pseudopecoelina platycephali Shen, 1986
- Pseudopecoelina puriensis Ahmad, 1978
- Pseudopecoelina stunkardi Ahmad, 1978
- Pseudopecoelina xishaensis Gu & Shen, 1983
