= Plagiocirrus =

Scientific classification
- Kingdom: Animalia
- Phylum: Platyhelminthes
- Class: Trematoda
- Order: Plagiorchiida
- Family: Opecoelidae
- Subfamily: Plagioporinae
- Genus: Plagiocirrus; Van Cleave & Mueller, 1932

Genus of flukes

Plagiocirrus is a genus of trematodes in the family Opecoelidae.

== Species ==
- Plagiocirrus primus Van Cleave & Mueller, 1932
- Plagiocirrus testeus Fritts, 1959
- Plagiocirrus wuyiensis Wang, 1981
