= Hexagrammia =

Scientific classification
- Kingdom: Animalia
- Phylum: Platyhelminthes
- Class: Trematoda
- Order: Plagiorchiida
- Family: Opecoelidae
- Subfamily: Stenakrinae
- Genus: Hexagrammia; Baeva, 1965

Genus of flukes

Hexagrammia is a genus of trematodes in the family Opecoelidae.

== Species ==
- Hexagrammia longitestis Schell, 1973
- Hexagrammia zhukovi Baeva, 1965
