= Macrourimegatrema =

Scientific classification
- Kingdom: Animalia
- Phylum: Platyhelminthes
- Class: Trematoda
- Order: Plagiorchiida
- Family: Opecoelidae
- Subfamily: Podocotylinae
- Genus: Macrourimegatrema; Blend, Dronen & Armstrong, 2004

Genus of flukes

Macrourimegatrema is a genus of trematodes in the family Opecoelidae.

== Species ==
- Macrourimegatrema brayi Blend, Dronen & Armstrong, 2004
- Macrourimegatrema gadoma Blend, Dronen & Armstrong, 2007
