= Vesicocoelium =

Scientific classification
- Kingdom: Animalia
- Phylum: Platyhelminthes
- Class: Trematoda
- Order: Plagiorchiida
- Family: Opecoelidae
- Subfamily: Plagioporinae
- Genus: Vesicocoelium; Tang, Hsu, Huang & Lu, 1975

Genus of flukes

Vesicocoelium is a genus of trematodes in the family Opecoelidae.

== Species ==
- Vesicocoelium marinum (Karyakarte & Yadav, 1976) Cribb, 2005
- Vesicocoelium solenophagum Tang, Hsu, Huang & Lu, 1975
