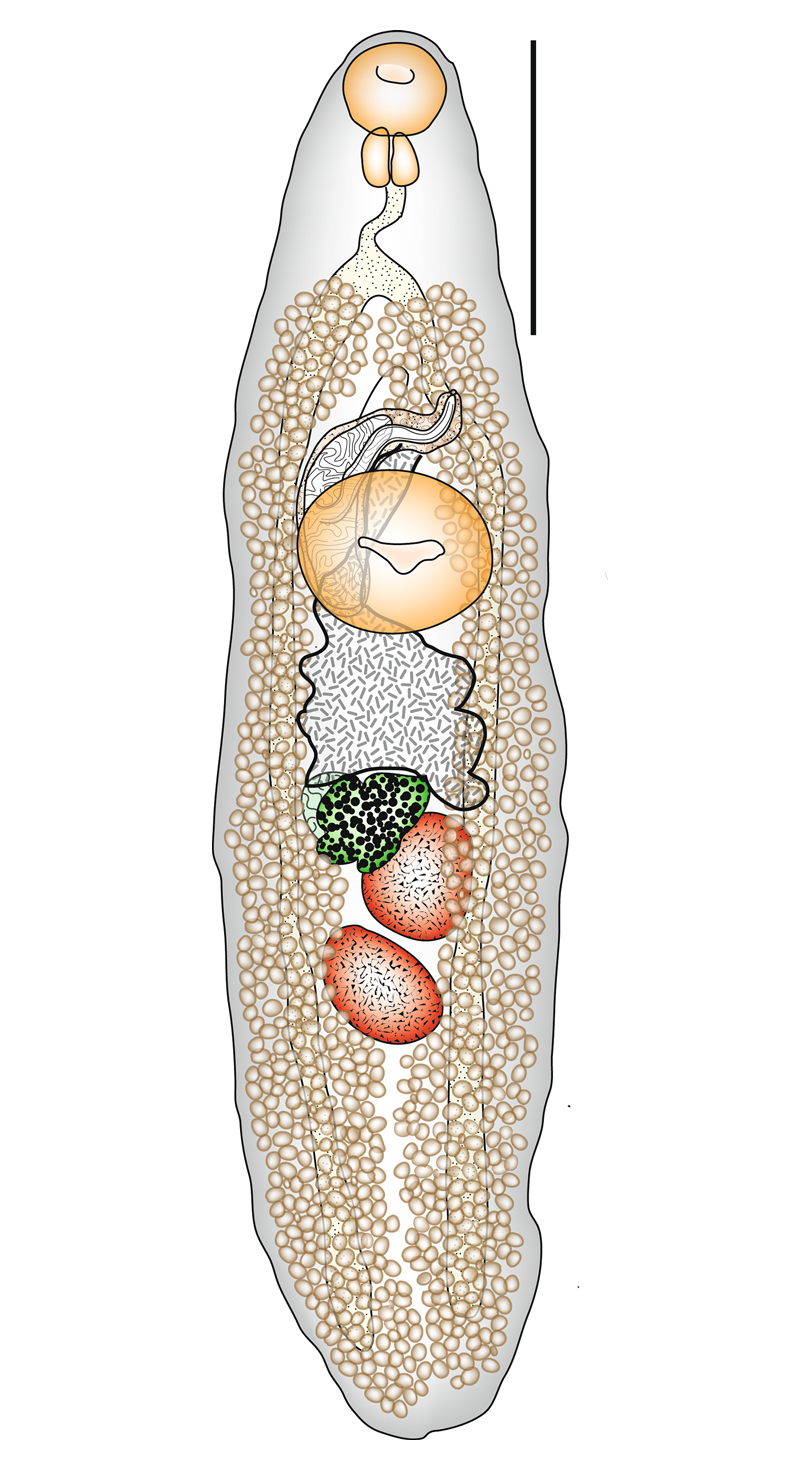
- Hamacreadium cribbi

Scientific classification
- Kingdom: Animalia
- Phylum: Platyhelminthes
- Class: Trematoda
- Order: Plagiorchiida
- Family: Opecoelidae
- Subfamily: Hamacreadiinae
- Genus: Hamacreadium; Linton, 1910

= Hamacreadium =

Genus of worms

Hamacreadium is a genus of trematodes in the family Opecoelidae. It is synonymous with Olivacreadium Bilqees, 1976. Species of Hamacreadium are endoparasitic in fish such as Lethrinus Cuvier, 1829.

== Species ==
- Hamacreadium cribbi Bray & Justine, 2016
- Hamacreadium hainanense Shen, 1990
- Hamacreadium interruptum Nagaty, 1941
- Hamacreadium lethrini Yamaguti, 1934
- Hamacreadium longivesiculum (Yamaguti, 1952) Martin, Cutmore, Ward & Cribb, 2017
- Hamacreadium lutiani (Shen, 1990) Martin, Cutmore, Ward & Cribb, 2017
- Hamacreadium morgani Baz, 1946
- Hamacreadium mutabile Linton, 1910
- Hamacreadium phyllorchis (Bilqees, 1976) Cribb, 2005

== Species synonymised with species of Hamacreadium ==
- Hamacreadium hainanense Shen, 1990
  - Maculifer spiralis Soota, Srivastava & Ghosh, 1970
- Hamacreadium interruptum Nagaty, 1941
  - Hamacreadium interruptus Nagaty, 1941
- Hamacreadium longivesiculum (Yamaguti, 1952)
  - Plagioporus longivesicula Yamaguti, 1952
- Hamacreadium lutiani (Shen, 1990) Martin, Cutmore, Ward & Cribb, 2017
  - Podocotyle lutiani Shen, 1990
- Hamacreadium morgani Baz, 1946
  - Hamacreadium agyptia Abdou, Heckmann, Beltagy & Ashour, 2001
  - Hamacreadium balistesi Nagaty & Abdel-Aal, 1962
  - Hamacreadium egyptia Abdou, Heckmann, Beltagy & Ashour, 2001
  - Hamacreadium lenthrium Manter, 1963
  - Hamacreadium lethrini Nagaty & Abdel-Aal, 1962
  - Hamacreadium nagatyi Lamothe-Argumedo, 1962
  - Hamacreadium nebulosae Nagaty & Abdel-Aal, 1962
- Hamacreadium mutabile Linton, 1910
  - Hamacreadium indicum Gupta & Tewari, 1985
- Hamacreadium phyllorchis (Bilqees, 1976)
  - Hamacreadium heterorchis (Bilqees, 1976) Cribb, 2005
  - Olivacreadium heterorchis Biqees, 1976
  - Olivacreadium phyllorchis Bilqees, 1976
