= Jerguillicola =

Scientific classification
- Kingdom: Animalia
- Phylum: Platyhelminthes
- Class: Trematoda
- Order: Plagiorchiida
- Family: Opecoelidae
- Subfamily: Plagioporinae
- Genus: Jerguillicola; Bray, 2002
- Species: J. leonora

Binomial name
- Jerguillicola leonora Bray, 2002

Genus of flukes

Jerguillicola is a genus of trematodes in the family Opecoelidae. It consists of one species, Jerguillicola leonora.
