= Opecoeloides =

Scientific classification
- Kingdom: Animalia
- Phylum: Platyhelminthes
- Class: Trematoda
- Order: Plagiorchiida
- Family: Opecoelidae
- Subfamily: Opecoelinae
- Genus: Opecoeloides; Odhner, 1928

Genus of flukes

Opecoeloides is a genus of trematodes in the family Opecoelidae. It has been synonymised with Cymbephallus Linton, 1934 and Fimbriatus von Wicklen, 1946.

== Species ==
- Opecoeloides belizensis Fischthal, 1977
- Opecoeloides brachyteleus Manter, 1947
- Opecoeloides catarinensis Amato, 1983
- Opecoeloides columbellae (Pagenstecher, 1862) Jousson & Bartoli, 2000
- Opecoeloides elongatus Manter, 1947
- Opecoeloides eucinostomi (Manter, 1940) von Wicklen, 1946
- Opecoeloides feliciae Martorelli, 1992
- Opecoeloides fimbriatus (Linton, 1934) Sogandares-Bernal & Hutton, 1959
- Opecoeloides fugus Li, Qiu & Zhang, 1988
- Opecoeloides furcatus (Rudolphi, 1819) Odhner, 1928
- Opecoeloides manaarensis Gupta, 1956
- Opecoeloides manteri (Hunninen & Cable, 1940) Hunninen & Cable, 1941
- Opecoeloides melanopteri Amato, 1983
- Opecoeloides pedicathedrae Travassos, Teixeira de Freitas & Bührnheim, 1966
- Opecoeloides polyfimbriatus Read, 1947
- Opecoeloides polynemi von Wicklen, 1946
- Opecoeloides stenosomae Amato, 1983
- Opecoeloides thyrinopsi (Manter, 1940) Skrjabin & Petrov, 1958
- Opecoeloides vitellosus (Linton, 1900) von Wicklen, 1946

== Species later synonymised with species of Opecoeloides ==
- Opecoeloides columbellae (Pagenstecher, 1862) Jousson & Bartoli, 2000
  - Cercaria columbellae Pagenstecher, 1862
- Opecoeloides eucinostomi (Manter, 1940) von Wicklen, 1946
  - Anisoporus eucinostomi Manter, 1940
- Opecoeloides fimbriatus (Linton, 1934) Sogandares-Bernal & Hutton, 1959
  - Cymbephallus fimbriatus Linton, 1934
- Opecoeloides furcatus (Rudolphi, 1819) Odhner, 1928
  - Distoma furcatum Rudolphi, 1819
- Opecoeloides manteri (Hunninen & Cable, 1940) Hunninen & Cable, 1941
  - Anisoporus manteri Hunninen & Cable, 1940
- Opecoeloides thyrinopsi (Manter, 1940) Skrjabin & Petrov, 1958
  - Anisoporus thyrinopsi Manter, 1940
- Opecoeloides vitellosus (Linton, 1900) von Wicklen, 1946
  - Cymbephallus vitellosus (Linton, 1900) Linton, 1934
  - Distomum vitellosum Linton, 1900
