= Stenakron =

Scientific classification
- Kingdom: Animalia
- Phylum: Platyhelminthes
- Class: Trematoda
- Order: Plagiorchiida
- Family: Opecoelidae
- Genus: Stenakron; Stafford, 1904

Genus of flukes

Stenakron is a genus of trematodes in the family Opecoelidae.

== Species ==
- Stenakron mancopsetti Gaevskaya & Kovaleva, 1977
- Stenakron quadrilobatum (Bazikalova, 1932)
- Stenakron quinquelobatum (Layman, 1930) Mamaev, Parukhin & Baeva, 1963
- Stenakron skrjabini (Issaitchikov, 1928) Yamaguti, 1971
- Stenakron vetustum Stafford, 1904
- Stenakron vitellosum (Manter, 1934) Cribb, 2005
