= Dactylomyza =

Scientific classification
- Kingdom: Animalia
- Phylum: Platyhelminthes
- Class: Trematoda
- Order: Plagiorchiida
- Family: Opecoelidae
- Subfamily: Opecoelinae
- Genus: Dactylomyza; Aken'Ova, 2003

Genus of flukes

Dactylomyza is a genus of trematodes in the family Opecoelidae.

== Species ==
- Dactylomyza equesi (Manter, 1947) Aken'Ova, 2003
- Dactylomyza gibsoni Aken'Ova, 2003

== Species later synonymised with species of Dactylomyza ==
- Dactylomyza equesi (Manter, 1947) Aken'Ova, 2003
  - Pseudopecoeloides equesi Manter, 1947
