= Villarrealina =

Scientific classification
- Kingdom: Animalia
- Phylum: Platyhelminthes
- Class: Trematoda
- Order: Plagiorchiida
- Family: Opecoelidae
- Subfamily: Plagioporinae
- Genus: Villarrealina; Bolaños & Salas, 1982
- Species: V. peruana

Binomial name
- Villarrealina peruana Bolaños & Salas, 1982

Genus of flukes

Villarrealina is a genus of trematodes in the family Opecoelidae. It consists of one species, Villarrealina peruana.
