= Multivitellina =

Scientific classification
- Kingdom: Animalia
- Phylum: Platyhelminthes
- Class: Trematoda
- Order: Plagiorchiida
- Family: Opecoelidae
- Subfamily: Plagioporinae
- Genus: Multivitellina; Schell, 1974
- Species: M. idahoensis

Binomial name
- Multivitellina idahoensis Schell, 1974

Genus of flukes

Multivitellina is a genus of trematodes in the family Opecoelidae. It consists of one species, Multivitellina idahoensis.
