= Neolebouria =

Scientific classification
- Kingdom: Animalia
- Phylum: Platyhelminthes
- Class: Trematoda
- Order: Plagiorchiida
- Family: Opecoelidae
- Subfamily: Podocotylinae
- Genus: Neolebouria; Gibson, 1976

Genus of flukes

Neolebouria is a genus of trematodes in the family Opecoelidae.

== Species ==
- Neolebouria acanthogobii (Yamaguti, 1951) Gibson, 1976
- Neolebouria antarctica (Szidat & Graefe, 1967) Zdzitowiecki, 1990
- Neolebouria georgenascimentoi Bray, 2002
- Neolebouria georgiensis Gibson, 1976
- Neolebouria lanceolata (Price, 1934) Reimer, 1987
- Neolebouria leiognathi (Wang, Wang & Zhang, 1992) Bray, 2002
- Neolebouria lobata (Yamaguti, 1934) [emend. Manter, 1947] Gibson, 1976
- Neolebouria maorum (Allison, 1966) Gibson, 1976
- Neolebouria merretti Gibson & Bray, 1982
- Neolebouria pentacerotis Machida & Araki, 2002
- Neolebouria terranovaensis Zdzitowiecki, Pisano & Vacchi, 1993
- Neolebouria tinkerbellae Thompson & Margolis, 1987
- Neolebouria tohei (Yamaguti, 1970) Gibson, 1976 [emend. Bartoli, Bray & Gibson, 2003] emend. Martin, Cutmore & Cribb, 2017
