= Decemtestis =

Scientific classification
- Kingdom: Animalia
- Phylum: Platyhelminthes
- Class: Trematoda
- Order: Plagiorchiida
- Family: Opecoelidae
- Subfamily: Plagioporinae
- Genus: Decemtestis; Yamaguti, 1934

Genus of flukes

Decemtestis is a genus of trematodes in the family Opecoelidae. It has been synonymised with Allodecemtestis Hafeezullah, 1970.

== Species ==
- Decemtestis asymmetricus Wang, 1991
- Decemtestis azumae (Layman, 1930) Yamaguti, 1934
- Decemtestis bera Yamaguti, 1938
- Decemtestis biacetabulata Srivastava, 1936 emend. Hafeezullah, 1970
- Decemtestis bilqeesae (Ahmad, 1990) Cribb, 2005
- Decemtestis brevicirrus Srivastava, 1936 emend. Hafeezullah, 1970
- Decemtestis callionymi Yamaguti, 1934 emend. Yamaguti, 1951
- Decemtestis cynoglossi Karyakarte & Yadav, 1977
- Decemtestis ditrematis Yamaguti, 1934
- Decemtestis dollfusi Ahmad, 1983
- Decemtestis drepanai Gupta & Puri, 1982
- Decemtestis fusiformis Wang, 1986
- Decemtestis goniistii Yamaguti, 1938
- Decemtestis johnii Shaukat & Bilqees, 2012
- Decemtestis kobayashii Park, 1939
- Decemtestis lutiani Wang, 1986
- Decemtestis manteri Zhukov, 1970
- Decemtestis marginoacetabulatus Karyakarte & Yadav, 1977
- Decemtestis megacotyla Yamaguti, 1938
- Decemtestis mehrai Srivastava, 1936 emend. Gupta & Jahan, 1977
- Decemtestis mystusi Dhanumkumari, 1999
- Decemtestis neopercis Yamaguti, 1938
- Decemtestis odeningi (Ahmad, 1988) Cribb, 2005
- Decemtestis pagrosomi Yamaguti, 1938
- Decemtestis parapercis Yamaguti, 1959
- Decemtestis pseudolabri Manter, 1954 emend. Hafeezullah, 1970
- Decemtestis sillagonis Yamaguti, 1934
- Decemtestis singhi Ahmad, 1983
- Decemtestis skrjabini (Ahmad, 1988) Cribb, 2005
- Decemtestis spari Yamaguti, 1938
- Decemtestis srivastavai Gupta & Jahan, 1977
- Decemtestis takanoha Yamaguti, 1951
- Decemtestis varmai Gupta & Gupta, 1988
