= Allopodocotyle =

Scientific classification
- Kingdom: Animalia
- Phylum: Platyhelminthes
- Class: Trematoda
- Order: Plagiorchiida
- Family: Opecoelidae
- Subfamily: Hamacreadiinae
- Genus: Allopodocotyle; Pritchard, 1966

Genus of flukes

Allopodocotyle is a genus of trematodes in the family Opecoelidae.

== Species ==
- Allopodocotyle argyropsi Madhavi, 1975
- Allopodocotyle atzi (Nigrelli, 1939) Pritchard, 1966
- Allopodocotyle enkaimushi Blend, Kuramochi & Dronen, 2015
- Allopodocotyle epinepheli (Yamaguti, 1942) Pritchard, 1966
- Allopodocotyle heronensis Downie & Cribb, 2011
- Allopodocotyle israelensis (Fischthal, 1980) Bray, 1987
- Allopodocotyle jaffensis (Fischthal, 1980) Bray, 1987
- Allopodocotyle lepomis (Dobrovolny, 1939) Pritchard, 1966
- Allopodocotyle lethrini (Yamaguti, 1942) Pritchard, 1966
- Allopodocotyle lutianusi Gupta & Ahamad, 1977
- Allopodocotyle manteri (Saoud & Ramadan, 1984) Cribb, 2005
- Allopodocotyle margolisi Gibson, 1995
- Allopodocotyle mecopera (Manter, 1940) Pritchard, 1966
- Allopodocotyle pedicellata (Stossich, 1887) Pritchard, 1966
- Allopodocotyle plectropomi (Manter, 1963) Pritchard, 1966
- Allopodocotyle pritchardae Madhavi, 1975
- Allopodocotyle recifensis Bray, 1987
- Allopodocotyle serrani (Yamaguti, 1952) Pritchard, 1966
- Allopodocotyle skoliorchis Aken'Ova, 2003
- Allopodocotyle tamame (Yamaguti, 1942) Pritchard, 1966
- Allopodocotyle tunisiensis Derbel & Neifar, 2009
- Allopodocotyle virens (Sinitsin, 1931) Pritchard, 1966
