= Pseudopecoeloides =

Scientific classification
- Kingdom: Animalia
- Phylum: Platyhelminthes
- Class: Trematoda
- Order: Plagiorchiida
- Family: Opecoelidae
- Subfamily: Opecoelinae
- Genus: Pseudopecoeloides; Yamaguti, 1940

Genus of flukes

Pseudopecoeloides is a genus of trematodes in the family Opecoelidae.

== Species ==
- Pseudopecoeloides akule Yamaguti, 1970
- Pseudopecoeloides arripi Aken'Ova, Cribb & Bray, 2009
- Pseudopecoeloides astrocongeris Shen, 1989
- Pseudopecoeloides atherinomori Aken'Ova, Cribb & Bray, 2009
- Pseudopecoeloides boops Yamaguti, 1970
- Pseudopecoeloides buckleyi (Saoud & Ramadan, 1984) Martin, Cutmore & Cribb, 2018
- Pseudopecoeloides capucini Toman, 1992
- Pseudopecoeloides carangi (Yamaguti, 1938) Yamaguti, 1940
- Pseudopecoeloides chloroscombri (Fischthal & Thomas, 1970) Bartoli, Bray & Gibson, 2003
- Pseudopecoeloides dayawanensis Shen & Tong, 1990
- Pseudopecoeloides engeleri Rohner & Cribb, 2013
- Pseudopecoeloides gracilis Manter, 1947
- Pseudopecoeloides hafeezullahi Aken'Ova, Cribb & Bray, 2009
- Pseudopecoeloides hickmani Aken'Ova, Cribb & Bray, 2009
- Pseudopecoeloides lesteri Aken'Ova, Cribb & Bray, 2009
- Pseudopecoeloides mugilis Shen, 1990
- Pseudopecoeloides opelu Yamaguti, 1970
- Pseudopecoeloides orientalis Gupta & Ahmad, 1978
- Pseudopecoeloides parviacetabulatus Yamaguti, 1970
- Pseudopecoeloides psettodi Parukhin, 1983
- Pseudopecoeloides puriensis Ahmad, 1978
- Pseudopecoeloides scomberi Hafeezullah, 1971
- Pseudopecoeloides tenuis Yamaguti, 1940
- Pseudopecoeloides tenuoides Martin, 1960
- Pseudopecoeloides wekeula Yamaguti, 1970
