= Neodactylostomum =

Scientific classification
- Kingdom: Animalia
- Phylum: Platyhelminthes
- Class: Trematoda
- Order: Plagiorchiida
- Family: Opecoelidae
- Subfamily: Opecoelinae
- Genus: Neodactylostomum; Toman, 1996
- Species: N. saipanense

Binomial name
- Neodactylostomum saipanense (Toman, 1992) Toman, 1996

Genus of flukes

Neodactylostomum is a genus of trematodes in the family Opecoelidae. It consists of one species, Neodactylostomum saipanense. Toman (1996) synonymised Neodactylostomum and N. saipanense with Paradactylostomum Zhukov, 1972 and P. saipanense Toman, 1992, respectively.
