= Buticulotrema =

Scientific classification
- Kingdom: Animalia
- Phylum: Platyhelminthes
- Class: Trematoda
- Order: Plagiorchiida
- Family: Opecoelidae
- Subfamily: Podocotylinae
- Genus: Buticulotrema; Blend, Dronen & McEachran, 1993

Genus of flukes

Buticolotrema is a genus of trematodes in the family Opecoelidae.

== Species ==
- Buticulotrema stenauchenus Blend, Dronen & McEachran, 1993
- Buticulotrema thermichthysi Bray, Waeschenbach, Dyal, Littlewood & Morand, 2014
