= Choanotrema =

Scientific classification
- Kingdom: Animalia
- Phylum: Platyhelminthes
- Class: Trematoda
- Order: Plagiorchiida
- Family: Opecoelidae
- Subfamily: Hamacreadiinae
- Genus: Choanotrema; Nitta & Tanaka, 2018

Genus of flukes

Choanotrema is a genus of trematodes in the family Opecoelidae. It was formerly named Choanostoma Yamaguti, 1934.

== Species ==
- Choanotrema plectorhynchi (Yamaguti, 1934)
- Choanotrema secundum (Durio & Manter, 1968)
