= Podocotyloides =

Scientific classification
- Kingdom: Animalia
- Phylum: Platyhelminthes
- Class: Trematoda
- Order: Plagiorchiida
- Family: Opecoelidae
- Subfamily: Hamacreadiinae
- Genus: Podocotyloides; Yamaguti, 1934

Genus of flukes

Podocotyloides is a genus of trematodes in the family Opecoelidae.

== Species ==
- Podocotyloides australis Martin, Cutmore & Cribb, 2018
- Podocotyloides brevis Andres & Overstreet, 2013
- Podocotyloides brevivesiculatus Martin, Cutmore & Cribb, 2018
- Podocotyloides buckleyi (Saoud & Ramadan, 1984)
- Podocotyloides ghanensis (Fischthal & Thomas, 1970) Aken'Ova, 2003
- Podocotyloides ghardaguensis (Saoud & Ramadan, 1984)
- Podocotyloides gracilis (Yamaguti, 1952) Pritchard, 1966
- Podocotyloides magnatestis Aleshkina & Gaevskaya, 1985
- Podocotyloides parupenei (Manter, 1963) Pritchard, 1966
- Podocotyloides petalophallus Yamaguti, 1934
- Podocotyloides stenometra Pritchard, 1966
