= Pseudopecoelus =

Scientific classification
- Kingdom: Animalia
- Phylum: Platyhelminthes
- Class: Trematoda
- Order: Plagiorchiida
- Family: Opecoelidae
- Subfamily: Opecoelinae
- Genus: Pseudopecoelus von Wicklen, 1946

Genus of flukes

Pseudopecoelus is a genus of trematodes in the family Opecoelidae. It has been synonymised with Neopecoelus Manter, 1947.

== Species ==
- Pseudopecoelus ablennesi Bray, 1987
- Pseudopecoelus acanthuri Yamaguti, 1970
- Pseudopecoelus akamachi Machida & Araki, 2002
- Pseudopecoelus alectis Shen, 1990
- Pseudopecoelus ariusi Parukhin, 1983
- Pseudopecoelus barkeri Hanson, 1950
- Pseudopecoelus bilqeesae Ahmad & Dhar, 1987
- Pseudopecoelus brayi Madhavi & Triveni Lakshmi, 2010
- Pseudopecoelus brevivesiculatus Hanson, 1955
- Pseudopecoelus dollfusi Ahmad & Dhar, 1987
- Pseudopecoelus elongatus (Yamaguti, 1938) von Wicklen, 1946
- Pseudopecoelus epinepheli Wang, 1982
- Pseudopecoelus ghanensis Fischthal & Thomas, 1970
- Pseudopecoelus gibbonsiae Manter & Van Cleave, 1951
- Pseudopecoelus gymnothoracis Nahhas & Cable, 1964
- Pseudopecoelus hemilobatus Manter, 1954
- Pseudopecoelus holocentri Nahhas & Cable, 1964
- Pseudopecoelus japonicus (Yamaguti, 1938) von Wicklen, 1946
- Pseudopecoelus littoralis Caballero y Caballero & Caballero Rodríguez, 1976
- Pseudopecoelus manteri Sogandares & Hutton, 1958
- Pseudopecoelus maomao Yamaguti, 1970
- Pseudopecoelus mccauleyi Blend, Dronen, Racz & Gardner, 2017
- Pseudopecoelus minutus Nahhas & Cable, 1964
- Pseudopecoelus nossamani Kruse, 1977
- Pseudopecoelus odeningi Ahmad, 1987
- Pseudopecoelus priacanthi (MacCallum, 1921) Manter, 1947
- Pseudopecoelus pritchardae Gupta & Sayal, 1979
- Pseudopecoelus puhipaka Yamaguti, 1970
- Pseudopecoelus pyriformis Prudhoe & Bray, 1973
- Pseudopecoelus scorpaenae (Manter, 1947) Overstreet, 1969
- Pseudopecoelus sesokoensis Dyer, Williams & Williams, 1988
- Pseudopecoelus sewelli Bray, 1990
- Pseudopecoelus sosoae Bray & Justine, 2010
- Pseudopecoelus sphyraenae Yamaguti, 1970
- Pseudopecoelus stunkardi Ahmad, 1990
- Pseudopecoelus tortugae von Wicklen, 1946
- Pseudopecoelus umbrinae Manter & Van Cleave, 1951
- Pseudopecoelus vitellozonatus Pritchard, 1966
- Pseudopecoelus vulgaris (Manter, 1934) von Wicklen, 1946
