= Helicometrina =

Scientific classification
- Kingdom: Animalia
- Phylum: Platyhelminthes
- Class: Trematoda
- Order: Plagiorchiida
- Family: Opecoelidae
- Subfamily: Helicometrinae
- Genus: Helicometrina; Linton, 1910

Genus of flukes

Helicometrina is a genus of trematodes in the family Opecoelidae.

== Species ==
- Helicometrina execta (Linton, 1910) Overstreet, 1969
- Helicometrina indica Dhanumkumari, 1999
- Helicometrina labrisomi Oliva, Valdivia, Chavez, Molina & Cárdenas, 2015
- Helicometrina mirzai Siddiqi & Cable, 1960
- Helicometrina nimia Linton, 1910
- Helicometrina otolithi Bilqees, 1972
- Helicometrina plectorhynchii Jehan, 1973
- Helicometrina qatarensis Saoud, Ramadan & Al-Kawari, 1988
- Helicometrina quadrorchis Manter & Pritchard, 1960
- Helicometrina scomberi Gupta & Jahan, 1977
- Helicometrina unica Gupta & Puri, 1985

== Species later synonymised with species of Helicometrina ==
- Helicometrina execta (Linton, 1910) Overstreet, 1969
  - Helicometra execta Linton, 1910
  - Helicometrina parva Manter, 1933
  - Helicometrina trachinoti Siddiqi & Cable, 1960
- Helicometrina nimia Linton, 1910
  - Helicometrina chilomycteri Bilqees, 1976
  - Helicometrina delicatulus Bilqees, 1972
  - Helicometrina elongata Noble & Park, 1937
  - Helicometrina hexorchis Gupta & Sehgal, 1970
  - Helicometrina karachiensis Bilqees, 1972
  - Helicometrina orientalis Srivastava, 1936
  - Helicometrina septorchis Srivastava, 1936
