= Paramanteriella =

Scientific classification
- Kingdom: Animalia
- Phylum: Platyhelminthes
- Class: Trematoda
- Order: Plagiorchiida
- Family: Opecoelidae
- Subfamily: Plagioporinae
- Genus: Paramanteriella; Li, Qiu & Zhang, 1988

Genus of flukes

Paramanteriella is a genus of trematodes in the family Opecoelidae.

== Species ==
- Paramanteriella cantherini Li, Qiu & Zhang, 1988
- Paramanteriella capoori (Jaiswal, Upadhyay, Malhotra, Blend, Dronen & Malhotra, 2014) Martin, Cutmore & Cribb, 2017
- Paramanteriella confusa (Overstreet, 1969) Martin, Cutmore & Cribb, 2017
- Paramanteriella leiperi (Gupta, 1956) Martin, Cutmore & Cribb, 2017
- Paramanteriella pallenisca (Shipley & Hornell, 1905) Martin, Cutmore & Cribb, 2017
