= Propycnadenoides =

Scientific classification
- Kingdom: Animalia
- Phylum: Platyhelminthes
- Class: Trematoda
- Order: Plagiorchiida
- Family: Opecoelidae
- Subfamily: Opistholebetinae
- Genus: Propycnadenoides; Fischthal & Kuntz, 1964

Genus of flukes

Propycnadenoides is a genus of trematodes in the family Opecoelidae.

== Species ==
- Propycnadenoides naffari Al-Bassel, 2001
- Propycnadenoides philippinensis Fischthal & Kuntz, 1964
