= Paraplagioporus =

Scientific classification
- Kingdom: Animalia
- Phylum: Platyhelminthes
- Class: Trematoda
- Order: Plagiorchiida
- Family: Opecoelidae
- Subfamily: Hamacreadiinae
- Genus: Paraplagioporus; Yamaguti, 1939

Genus of flukes

Paraplagioporus is a genus of trematodes in the family Opecoelidae.

== Species ==
- Paraplagioporus isagi Yamaguti, 1939
- Paraplagioporus madrasensis Salman & Srivastava, 1990
