= Notoporus =

Scientific classification
- Kingdom: Animalia
- Phylum: Platyhelminthes
- Class: Trematoda
- Order: Plagiorchiida
- Family: Opecoelidae
- Subfamily: Opecoelinae
- Genus: Notoporus; Yamaguti, 1938

Genus of flukes

Notoporus is a genus of trematodes in the family Opecoelidae.

== Species ==
- Notoporus astrocongeris Shen & Qiu, 1995
- Notoporus fotedari (Ahmad & Dhar, 1989) Madhavi, 2011
- Notoporus gibsoni Ahmad, 1987
- Notoporus leiognathi Yamaguti, 1938
- Notoporus pristipomatis (Srivastava, 1942) Ahmad, 1985
- Notoporus stunkardi Ahmad, 1985

== Species later synonymised with species of Notoporus ==
- Notoporus fotedari (Ahmad & Dhar, 1989) Madhavi, 2011
  - Neonotoporus fotedari Ahmad & Dhar, 1989
- Notoporus pristipomatis (Srivastava, 1942) Ahmad, 1985
  - Horatrema pristipomatis Srivatava, 1942
