= Pellamyzon =

Scientific classification
- Kingdom: Animalia
- Phylum: Platyhelminthes
- Class: Trematoda
- Order: Plagiorchiida
- Family: Opecoelidae
- Subfamily: Plagioporinae
- Genus: Pellamyzon; Montgomery, 1957
- Species: P. abitionis

Binomial name
- Pellamyzon abitionis (McFarlane, 1936) Gibson & Bray, 1982

Genus of flukes

Pellamyzon is a genus of trematodes in the family Opecoelidae. It consists of one species, Pellamyzon abitionis.
