= Poracanthium =

Scientific classification
- Kingdom: Animalia
- Phylum: Platyhelminthes
- Class: Trematoda
- Order: Plagiorchiida
- Family: Opecoelidae
- Subfamily: Opecoelinae
- Genus: Poracanthium; Dollfus, 1948

Genus of flukes

Poracanthium is a genus of trematodes in the family Opecoelidae.

== Species ==
- Poracanthium furcatum Dollfus, 1948
- Poracanthium ghanense Fischthal & Thomas, 1970
