= Pinguitrema =

Scientific classification
- Kingdom: Animalia
- Phylum: Platyhelminthes
- Class: Trematoda
- Order: Plagiorchiida
- Family: Opecoelidae
- Subfamily: Opistholebetinae
- Genus: Pinguitrema; Siddiqi & Cable, 1960

Genus of flukes

Pinguitrema is a genus of trematodes in the family Opecoelidae.

== Species ==
- Pinguitrema lobatum Siddiqi & Cable, 1960
- Pinguitrema multilobatum (Travassos, Freitas & Burnheim, 1966) [emend. Gibson, 1976] Cribb, 2005
