= Apertile =

Scientific classification
- Kingdom: Animalia
- Phylum: Platyhelminthes
- Class: Trematoda
- Order: Plagiorchiida
- Family: Opecoelidae
- Subfamily: Opecoelinae
- Genus: Apertile; Overstreet, 1969

Genus of flukes

Apertile is a genus of trematodes in the family Opecoelidae.

== Species ==
- Apertile holocentri (Manter, 1947) Overstreet, 1969
- Apertile overstreeti Toman, 1992
