= Labracetabulum =

Scientific classification
- Kingdom: Animalia
- Phylum: Platyhelminthes
- Class: Trematoda
- Order: Plagiorchiida
- Family: Opecoelidae
- Subfamily: Opecoelinae
- Genus: Labracetabulum; Reimer, 1987

Genus of flukes

Labracetabulum is a genus of trematodes in the family Opecoelidae. Cribb's review of Labracetabulum synonymised it with Prolabria Reimer, 1987, which led to the synonymisation of P. monocentris Reimer, 1987 to L. monocentris (Reimer, 1987) Cribb, 2005.

== Morphology ==
Species of Labracetabulum are distinguished by the lack of a cirrus-sac, the use of separate ani proximal to the excretory pore to open the caeca, and distinct anterior and posterior lips on the ventral sucker.

== Species ==
- Labracetabulum gephyroberici Reimer, 1987
- Labracetabulum monocentris (Reimer, 1987) Cribb, 2005
