= Neohelicometra =

Scientific classification
- Kingdom: Animalia
- Phylum: Platyhelminthes
- Class: Trematoda
- Order: Plagiorchiida
- Family: Opecoelidae
- Subfamily: Helicometrinae
- Genus: Neohelicometra; Siddiqi & Cable, 1960
- Species: N. scorpaenae

Binomial name
- Neohelicometra scorpaenae Siddiqi & Cable, 1960

Genus of flukes

Neohelicometra is a genus of trematodes in the family Opecoelidae. It consists of only one species, Neohelicometra scorpaenae.

== Former species ==
A number of species formerly in Neohelicometra have been synonymised to other genera. They are:

- Neohelicometra antarcticae (Holloway & Bier, 1968) Sekerak & Arai, 1974, synonymised to Helicometra antarcticae Holloway & Bier, 1968
- Neohelicometra dalianensis Li, Qiu & Zhang, 1989, synonymised to Helicometra dalianensis (Li, Qiu & Zhang, 1989) Cribb, 2005
- Neohelicometra insolita (Polyanski, 1955) Sekerak & Arai, 1974, synonymised to Helicometra insolita Polyanski, 1955
- Neohelicometra pleurogrammi (Baeva, 1968) Sekerak & Arai, 1974, synonymised to Helicometra pleurogrammi (Baeva, 1968)
- Neohelicometra sebastis Sekerak & Arai, 1974, synonymised to Helicometra sebastis (Sekerak & Arai, 1974) Bray, 1979
