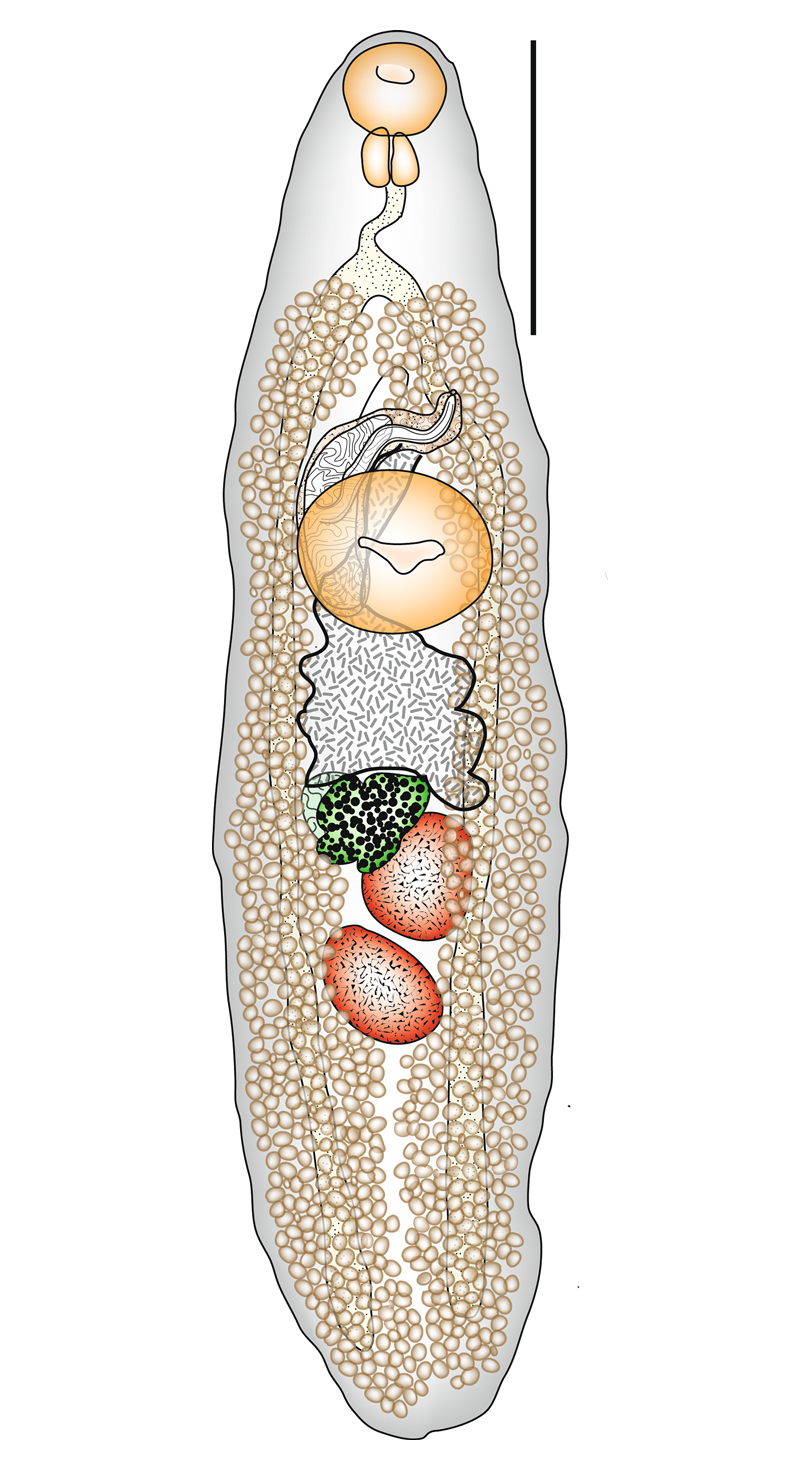

Scientific classification
- Kingdom: Animalia
- Phylum: Platyhelminthes
- Class: Trematoda
- Order: Plagiorchiida
- Family: Opecoelidae
- Genus: Hamacreadium
- Species: H. cribbi

Binomial name
- Hamacreadium cribbi Bray & Justine, 2016

= Hamacreadium cribbi =

Species of flatworm

Hamacreadium cribbi is a species of digenean, parasitic in the lethrinid fish Lethrinus miniatus. The species was collected off New Caledonia.

== Morphology ==
Hamacreadium cribbi is characterised by the size of its eggs which tend to be larger [72–93 (84) vs 54–81 (56) μm long] than those of other species of Hamacreadium. Other characteristics, such as body size and shape and internal ratios, differentiate H. cribbi from other species.

== Host ==
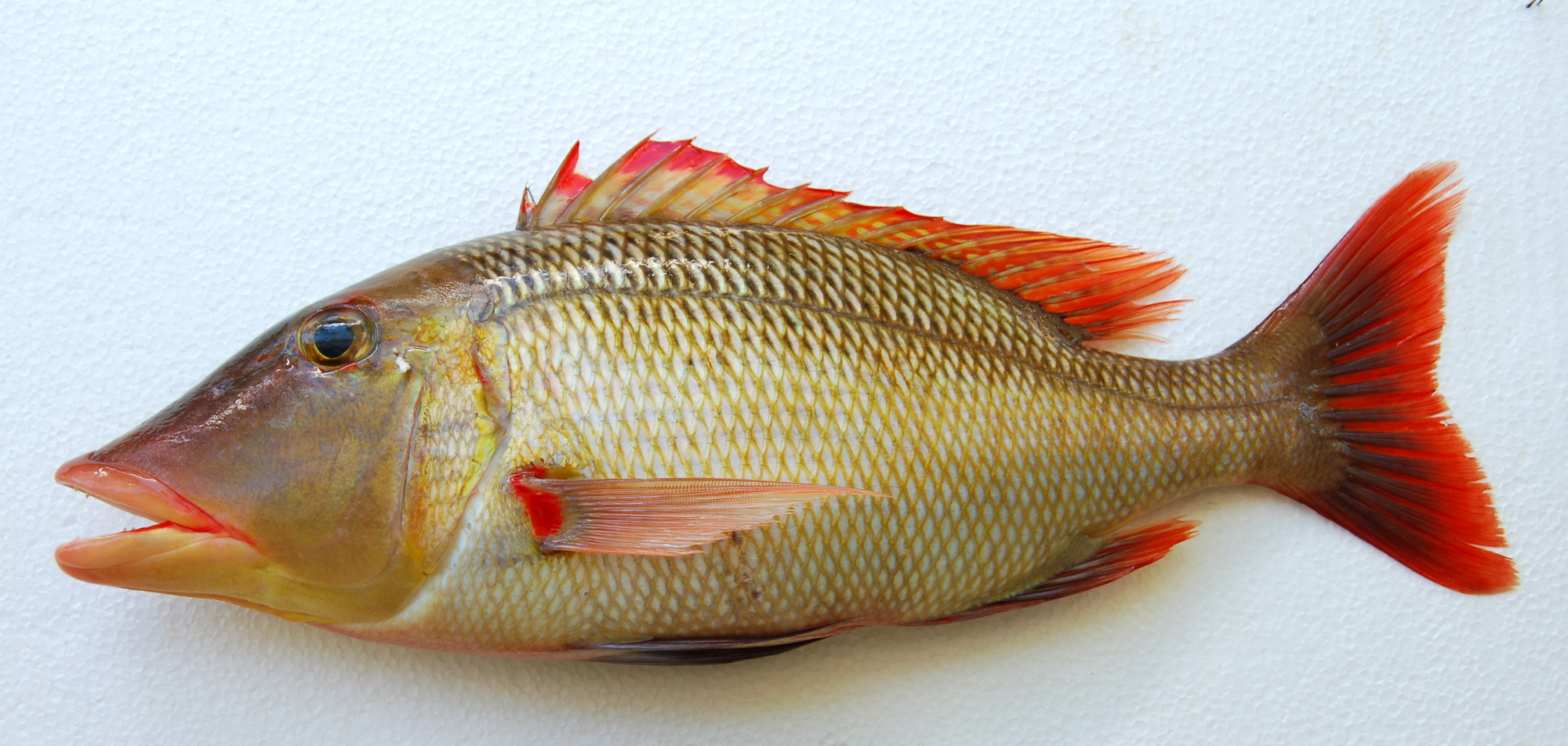
The sweetlip emperor, Lethrinus miniatus is the host of H. cribbi

The host of H. cribbi is the sweetlip emperor, Lethrinus miniatus. The worms were found in the digestive tract.

This species was reported from this host species in 2010 under the name Neolebouria sp. A. The following species as hosts of Neolebouria sp. A: the Spotcheek Emperor Lethrinus rubrioperculatus; the Pacific Yellowtail Emperor Lethrinus atkinsoni, the Drab Emperor Lethrinus ravus, and the Slender Emperor, Lethrinus variegatus. However, the description of H. cribbi was based solely on the worms from L. miniatus, and worms from the other hosts may differ, possibly at the specific level.

== Etymology ==
This species was named for "Tom Cribb of the University of Queensland, the pre-eminent digenean taxonomist of the Indo-Pacific Region".
