= Nezpercella =

Scientific classification
- Kingdom: Animalia
- Phylum: Platyhelminthes
- Class: Trematoda
- Order: Plagiorchiida
- Family: Opecoelidae
- Subfamily: Plagioporinae
- Genus: Nezpercella; Schell, 1974
- Species: N. lewisi

Binomial name
- Nezpercella lewisi Schell, 1974

Trematode genus

Nezpercella is a genus of trematodes in the family Opecoelidae. It consists of a single species, Nezpercella lewisi.
