= Mesocreadium =

Scientific classification
- Kingdom: Animalia
- Phylum: Platyhelminthes
- Class: Trematoda
- Order: Plagiorchiida
- Family: Opecoelidae
- Subfamily: Plagioporinae
- Genus: Mesocreadium; Reimer, 1987
- Species: M. hoplichthidis

Binomial name
- Mesocreadium hoplichthidis Reimer, 1987

Genus of flukes

Mesocreadium is a genus of trematodes in the family Opecoelidae. It consists of one species, Mesocreadium hoplichthidis.
