= Caudotestis =

Scientific classification
- Kingdom: Animalia
- Phylum: Platyhelminthes
- Class: Trematoda
- Order: Plagiorchiida
- Family: Opecoelidae
- Genus: Caudotestis; Issaitschikov, 1928

Genus of flukes

Caudotestis is a genus of trematodes in the family Opecoelidae.

== Species ==
- Caudotestis azurionis (Yamaguti, 1951)
- Caudotestis dorosomatis (Yamaguti, 1951)
- Caudotestis fusiformis (Price, 1934)
- Caudotestis glacialis (Zdzitowiecki, 1989) Cribb, 2005
- Caudotestis kerguelensis (Prudhoe & Bray, 1973) Cribb, 2005
- Caudotestis nicolli Issaitschikov, 1928
- Caudotestis opisthorchis (Polyanski, 1955) Cribb, 2005
- Caudotestis pachysomus Manter, 1954
- Caudotestis patagonensis Cantatore, Lancia, Lanfranchi & Timi, 2012
- Caudotestis rhabdosargi (Wang, 1982)
- Caudotestis seychellensis (Toman, 1992)
- Caudotestis skrjabini (Koval in Markevich, 1951)
- Caudotestis spari Yamaguti, 1951
- Caudotestis trachuri (Pogorel'tseva, 1954)
- Caudotestis tyrrhenicus Paggi & Orrechia, 1976
- Caudotestis ventichthysi Bray, Waeschenbach, Dyal, Littlewood & Morand, 2014
- Caudotestis zhukovi (Yamguti, 1971)
