= Scorpidotrema =

Scientific classification
- Kingdom: Animalia
- Phylum: Platyhelminthes
- Class: Trematoda
- Order: Plagiorchiida
- Family: Opecoelidae
- Genus: Scorpidotrema; Aken'Ova & Cribb, 2003

Genus of flukes

Scorpidotrema is a genus of trematodes in the family Opecoelidae. It consists of only one species, Scorpidotrema longistipes Aken'Ova & Cribb, 2003.
