= Parallelolebes =

Scientific classification
- Kingdom: Animalia
- Phylum: Platyhelminthes
- Class: Trematoda
- Order: Plagiorchiida
- Family: Opecoelidae
- Subfamily: Opistholebetinae
- Genus: Parallelolebes; Martin, Ribu, Cutmore & Cribb, 2018

Genus of flukes

Parallelolebes is a genus of trematodes in the family Opecoelidae.

== Species ==
- Parallelolebes australis Martin, Ribu, Cutmore & Cribb, 2018
- Parallelolebes elongatus (Ozaki, 1937) Martin, Ribu, Cutmore & Cribb, 2018
- Parallelolebes virilis Martin, Ribu, Cutmore & Cribb, 2018
