= Dactylostomum =

Scientific classification
- Kingdom: Animalia
- Phylum: Platyhelminthes
- Class: Trematoda
- Order: Plagiorchiida
- Family: Opecoelidae
- Subfamily: Opecoelinae
- Genus: Dactylostomum; Woolcock, 1935

Genus of flukes

Dactylostomum is a genus of trematodes in the family Opecoelidae. It is synonymised with Opedunculata Dwivedi, 1975.

== Species ==
- Dactylostomum armatum (Dwivedi, 1975) Cribb, 2005
- Dactylostomum caballeroi Martin, 1960
- Dactylostomum cribbi Gibson, Bray & Langdon, 1990
- Dactylostomum epinepheli Wang, 1982
- Dactylostomum gracile Woolcock, 1935
- Dactylostomum griffithsi Bray, 1987
- Dactylostomum harishii Agrawal & Agarwal, 1988
- Dactylostomum jhansiensis Agarwal & Agrawal, 1988
- Dactylostomum kashiensis (Maurya, Agarwal & Singh, 1989) Cribb, 2005
- Dactylostomum longivesiculum Shimazu & Machida, 1985
- Dactylostomum manteri Ramadan, 1985
- Dactylostomum nicolli Aken'Ova, Cribb & Bray, 2003
- Dactylostomum sapani (Dwivedi & Dwivedi, 1982) Cribb, 2005
- Dactylostomum satpali Agrawal & Sharma, 1989
- Dactylostomum tanegashimense Shimazu & Machida, 1985
- Dactylostomum vitellosum Manter, 1940
- Dactylostomum woolcocki Ramadan, 1985
- Dactylostomum yamagutii Ramadan, 1985

== Species later synonymised with species of Dactylostomum ==
- Dactylostomum armatum (Dwivedi, 1975) Cribb, 2005
  - Opedunculata armatus Dwivedi, 1975
- Dactylostomum kashiensis (Maurya, Agarwal & Singh, 1989) Cribb, 2005
  - Opedunculata kashiensis Maurya, Agarwal & Singh, 1989
- Dactylostomum sapani (Dwivedi & Dwivedi, 1982) Cribb, 2005
  - Opedunculata sapani Dwivedi & Dwivedi, 1982
