= Paropecoelus =

Scientific classification
- Kingdom: Animalia
- Phylum: Platyhelminthes
- Class: Trematoda
- Order: Plagiorchiida
- Family: Opecoelidae
- Subfamily: Opecoelinae
- Genus: Paropecoelus; Pritchard, 1966

Genus of flukes

Paropecoelus is a genus of trematodes in the family Opecoelidae.

== Species ==
- Paropecoelus bhabhai Gupta & Puri, 1986
- Paropecoelus corneliae Rohner & Cribb, 2013
- Paropecoelus dollfusi Ahmad, 1983
- Paropecoelus elongatus (Ozaki, 1928) Pritchard, 1966
- Paropecoelus filiformis Ahmad, 1978
- Paropecoelus indicus Madhavi, 1975
- Paropecoelus lanceolatus (Martin, 1960) Yamaguti, 1970
- Paropecoelus leonae Rohner & Cribb, 2013
- Paropecoelus manteri Ahmad, 1978
- Paropecoelus overstreeti Ahmad, 1983
- Paropecoelus palawanensis (Fischthal & Kuntz, 1964) Pritchard, 1966
- Paropecoelus parupenei Yamaguti, 1970
- Paropecoelus pritchardae Ahmad, 1983
- Paropecoelus quadratus (Ozaki, 1928) Shimazu & Machida, 1985
- Paropecoelus sacculatus Pritchard, 1966
- Paropecoelus sciaeni Ahmad, 1983
- Paropecoelus sogandaresi Pritchard, 1966
- Paropecoelus thapari (Nagaty, 1954) Pritchard, 1966
- Paropecoelus theraponi Gupta & Ahmad, 1976
- Paropecoelus upenoidis (Nagaty, 1954) Pritchard, 1966
