= Maculifer =

Scientific classification
- Kingdom: Animalia
- Phylum: Platyhelminthes
- Class: Trematoda
- Order: Plagiorchiida
- Family: Opecoelidae
- Subfamily: Opistholebetinae
- Genus: Maculifer; Nicoll, 1915

Genus of flukes

Maculifer is a genus of trematodes in the family Opecoelidae.

== Species ==
- Maculifer dayawanensis Shen & Tong, 1990
- Maculifer indicus (Gupta, 1968) Cribb, 2005
- Maculifer japonicus Layman, 1930
- Maculifer lagocephali (Liu, 1999) Cribb, 2005
- Maculifer pacificus Yamaguti, 1938
- Maculifer subaequiporus Nicoll, 1915
- Maculifer zhoushanensis Shen, 1986
