= Cainocreadium =

Scientific classification
- Kingdom: Animalia
- Phylum: Platyhelminthes
- Class: Trematoda
- Order: Plagiorchiida
- Family: Opecoelidae
- Subfamily: Hamacreadiinae
- Genus: Cainocreadium; Nicoll, 1909

Genus of flukes

Cainocreadium is a genus of trematodes in the family Opecoelidae. It has been synonymised with Apopodocotyle Pritchard, 1966, Cainocreadoides Nagaty, 1956, and Emmettrema Caballero y Caballero, 1946.

== Species ==
- Cainocreadium alanwilliamsi Bray, 1990
- Cainocreadium bolivari (Caballero y Caballero & Caballero Rodríguez, 1970) Martin, Cutmore, Ward & Cribb, 2017
- Cainocreadium consuetum (Linton, 1910) Yamaguti, 1971
- Cainocreadium dentecis Jousson & Bartoli, 2001
- Cainocreadium epinepheli (Yamaguti, 1934) [emend. Nagaty, 1956] Durio & Manter, 1968
- Cainocreadium flesi Korniychuk & Gaevskaya, 2000
- Cainocreadium gulella (Linton, 1910) Durio & Manter, 1968
- Cainocreadium labracis (Dujardin, 1845) Nicoll, 1909
- Cainocreadium lariosi (Caballero y Caballero, 1946) [emend. Yamaguti, 1953] Cribb, 2005
- Cainocreadium lintoni (Siddiqi & Cable, 1960) Durio & Manter, 1968
- Cainocreadium longisaccum (Siddiqi & Cable, 1960) Durio & Manter, 1968
- Cainocreadium musculometra (Bravo-Hollis & Manter, 1957) [emend. Pritchard, 1966] Martin, Cutmore, Ward & Cribb, 2017
- Cainocreadium oscitans (Linton, 1910) [emend. Pritchard, 1966] Cribb, 2005
- Cainocreadium pteroisi (Nagaty & Abdel-Aal, 1962) Durio & Manter, 1968
- Cainocreadium serrani (Nagaty, 1956) Manter, 1963
- Cainocreadium xishaense (Shen, 1985) Martin, Cutmore, Ward & Cribb, 2017
