= Opistholebes =

Scientific classification
- Kingdom: Animalia
- Phylum: Platyhelminthes
- Class: Trematoda
- Order: Plagiorchiida
- Family: Opecoelidae
- Subfamily: Opistholebetinae
- Genus: Opistholebes; Nicoll, 1915

Genus of flukes

Opistholebes is a genus of trematodes in the family Opecoelidae.

== Species ==
- Opistholebes adcotylophorus Manter, 1947
- Opistholebes amplicoelus Nicoll, 1915
- Opistholebes cotylophorus Ozaki, 1935
- Opistholebes diodontis Cable, 1956
- Opistholebes dongshanensis Liu, 1999
- Opistholebes elongatus Ozaki, 1937
- Opistholebes equicotylus Bilqees & Nighat, 1982
- Opistholebes indicus Gupta, 1968
- Opistholebes microovus Ku & Shen, 1965
- Opistholebes tetradontis Gupta, 1968
