= Margolisia =

Scientific classification
- Kingdom: Animalia
- Phylum: Platyhelminthes
- Class: Trematoda
- Order: Plagiorchiida
- Family: Opecoelidae
- Subfamily: Opecoelinae
- Genus: Margolisia; Bray, 1987
- Species: M. vidalensis

Binomial name
- Margolisia vidalensis Bray, 1987

Genus of flukes

Margolisia is a genus of trematodes in the family Opecoelidae. It consists of one species, Margolisia vidalensis.
