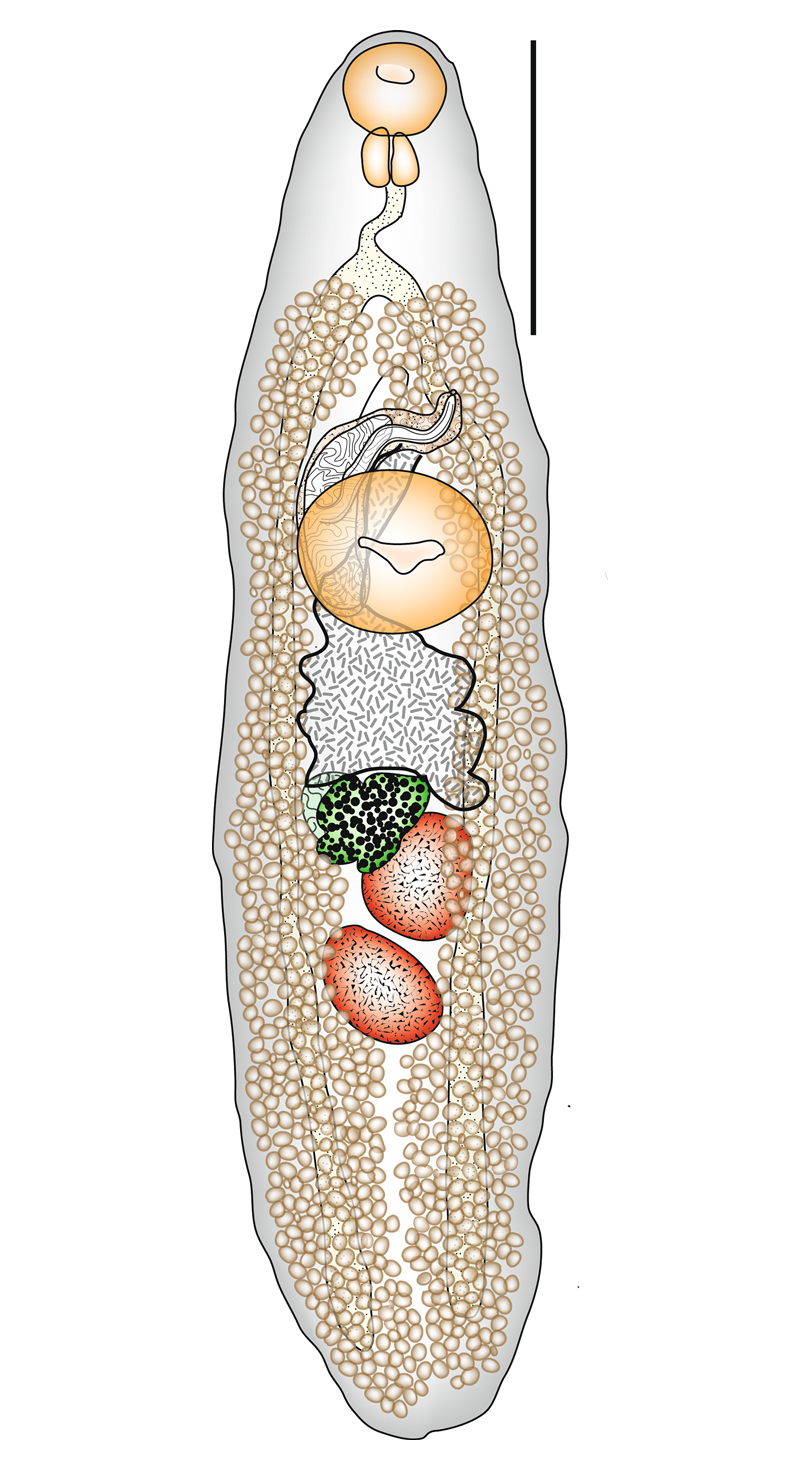
- Hamacreadium cribbi

Scientific classification
- Kingdom: Animalia
- Phylum: Platyhelminthes
- Class: Trematoda
- Order: Plagiorchiida
- Suborder: Xiphidiata
- Superfamily: Opecoelioidea
- Family: Opecoelidae; Ozaki, 1925

= Opecoelidae =

Family of flukes

Opecoelidae is a family of trematodes. It is the largest digenean family with over 90 genera and nearly 900 species, almost solely found in marine and freshwater teleost fishes. It was considered by Bray et al. to belong in the superfamily Opecoeloidea Ozaki, 1925 or the Brachycladioidea Odhner, 1905.

== Genera ==
Family Opecoelidae

- Subfamily Bathycreadiinae Martin, Huston, Cutmore & Cribb, 2018
  - Genus Bathycreadium Kabata, 1961
- Subfamily Hamacreadiinae Martin, Downie & Cribb, 2019
  - Genus Allopodocotyle Pritchard, 1966
  - Genus Bentholebouria Andres, Pulis & Overstreet, 2014
  - Genus Cainocreadium Nicoll, 1909
  - Genus Choanotrema Nitta & Tanaka, 2018
  - Genus Hamacreadium Linton, 1910
  - Genus Pacificreadium Durio & Manter, 1968
  - Genus Paraplagioporus Yamaguti, 1939
  - Genus Pedunculacetabulum Yamaguti, 1934
  - Genus Podocotyloides Yamaguti, 1934
- Subfamily Helicometrinae Bray, Cribb, Littlewood & Waeschenbach, 2016
  - Genus Helicometra Odhner, 1902
  - Genus Helicometrina Linton, 1910
  - Genus Neohelicometra Siddiqi & Cable, 1960
  - Genus Proneohelicometra Hassanine, 2006
- Subfamily Opecoelinae Ozaki, 1925
  - Genus Anisoporus Ozaki, 1928
  - Genus Anomalotrema Zhukov, 1957
  - Genus Apertile Overstreet, 1969
  - Genus Coitocaecum Nicoll, 1915
  - Genus Dactylomyza Aken'Ova, 2003
  - Genus Dactylostomum Woolcock, 1935
  - Genus Dimerosaccus Shimazu, 1980
  - Genus Discoverytrema Gibson, 1976
  - Genus Genitocotyle Park, 1937
  - Genus Labracetabulum Reimer, 1987
  - Genus Manteriella Yamaguti, 1958
  - Genus Margolisia Bray, 1987
  - Genus Neodactylostomum Toman, 1996
  - Genus Notoporus Yamaguti, 1938
  - Genus Opecoeloides Odhner, 1928
  - Genus Opecoelus Ozaki, 1925
  - Genus Opegaster Ozaki, 1928
  - Genus Paropecoelus Pritchard, 1966
  - Genus Parvacreadium Manter, 1940
  - Genus Poracanthium Dollfus, 1948
  - Genus Pseudopecoeloides Yamaguti, 1940
  - Genus Pseudopecoelus von Wicklen, 1946
- Subfamily Opecoelininae Gibson & Bray, 1984
  - Genus Bartoliella Aken'Ova, 2003
  - Genus Opecoelina Manter, 1934
- Subfamily Opistholebetinae Fukui, 1929
  - Genus Gaevskajatrema Gibson & Bray, 1982
  - Genus Heterolebes Ozaki, 1935
  - Genus Maculifer Nicoll, 1915
  - Genus Macvicaria Gibson & Bray, 1982
  - Genus Magnaosimum Martin, Crouch, Cutmore & Cribb, 2018
  - Genus Opistholebes Nicoll, 1915
  - Genus Pachycreadium Manter, 1954
  - Genus Parallelolebes Martin, Ribu, Cutmore & Cribb, 2018
  - Genus Peracreadium Nicoll, 1909
  - Genus Pinguitrema Siddiqi & Cable, 1960
  - Genus Propycnadenoides Fischthal & Kuntz, 1964
  - Genus Pseudoheterolebes Yamaguti, 1959
  - Genus Pseudopycnadena Saad-Fares & Maillard, 1986
  - Genus Pycnadena Linton, 1910
  - Genus Pycnadenoides Yamaguti, 1938
- Subfamily Plagioporinae Manter, 1947
  - Genus Anthochoanocotyle Kamegai, 1972
  - Genus Choerodonicola Cribb, 2005
  - Genus Decemtestis Yamaguti, 1934
  - Genus Diplobulbus Yamaguti, 1934
  - Genus Eucreadium Dayal, 1942
  - Genus Heterochoanostoma Machida, 2014
  - Genus Hysterogonia Hanson, 1955
  - Genus Jerguillicola Bray, 2002
  - Genus Mesocreadium Reimer, 1987
  - Genus Multivitellina Schell, 1974
  - Genus Neochoanostoma Bray & Cribb, 1989
  - Genus Neopecoelina Gupta, 1955
  - Genus Neoplagioporus Shimazu, 1990
  - Genus Neopodocotyle Dayal, 1950
  - Genus Nezpercella Schell, 1974
  - Genus Nicolla Wisniewski, 1933
  - Genus Paramanteriella Li, Qiu & Zhang, 1988
  - Genus Pellamyzon Montgomery, 1957
  - Genus Phyllotrema Yamaguti, 1934
  - Genus Plagiocirrus Van Cleave & Mueller, 1932
  - Genus Plagioporus Stafford, 1904
  - Genus Pseudopodocotyle Caballero Rodríguez, 1970
  - Genus Pseudosphaerostomum Koval & Shevchenko, 1970
  - Genus Pseudurorchis Yamaguti, 1971
  - Genus Sphaerostoma Rudolphi, 1809
  - Genus Thynstenopera Bilqees & Khatoon, 2004
  - Genus Trilobovarium Martin, Cutmore & Cribb, 2017
  - Genus Urorchis Ozaki, 1927
  - Genus Vesicocoelium Tang, Hsu, Huang & Lu, 1975
  - Genus Villarrealina Bolaños & Salas, 1982
- Subfamily Podocotylinae Dollfus, 1959
  - Genus Bathypodocotyle Martin, Huston, Cutmore & Cribb, 2018
  - Genus Buticulotrema Blend, Dronen & McEachran, 1993
  - Genus Halosaurotrema Martin, Huston, Cutmore & Cribb, 2018
  - Genus Macrourimegatrema Blend, Dronen & Armstrong, 2004
  - Genus Neolebouria Gibson, 1976
  - Genus Podocotyle Dujardin, 1845
  - Genus Tellervotrema Gibson & Bray, 1982
- Subfamily Pseudoplagioporinae Martin, Cutmore & Cribb, 2019
  - Genus Fairfaxia Cribb, 1989
  - Genus Pseudoplagioporus Yamaguti, 1938
  - Genus Shimazuia Cribb, 2005
- Subfamily Stenakrinae Yamaguti, 1970
  - Genus Biospeedotrema Bray, Waeschenbach, Dyal, Littlewood & Morand, 2014
  - Genus Caudotestis Issaitschikov, 1928
  - Genus Hexagrammia Baeva, 1965
  - Genus Holsworthotrema Martin, Huston, Cutmore & Cribb, 2018
  - Genus Neonotoporus Srivastava, 1942
  - Genus Pseudopecoelina Yamaguti, 1942
  - Genus Scorpidotrema Aken'Ova & Cribb, 2003
  - Genus Stenakron Stafford, 1904
- Genera incertae sedis
  - Genus Abyssopedunculus Martin, Huston, Cutmore & Cribb, 2018
  - Genus Mesobathylebouria Martin, Huston, Cutmore & Cribb, 2018
