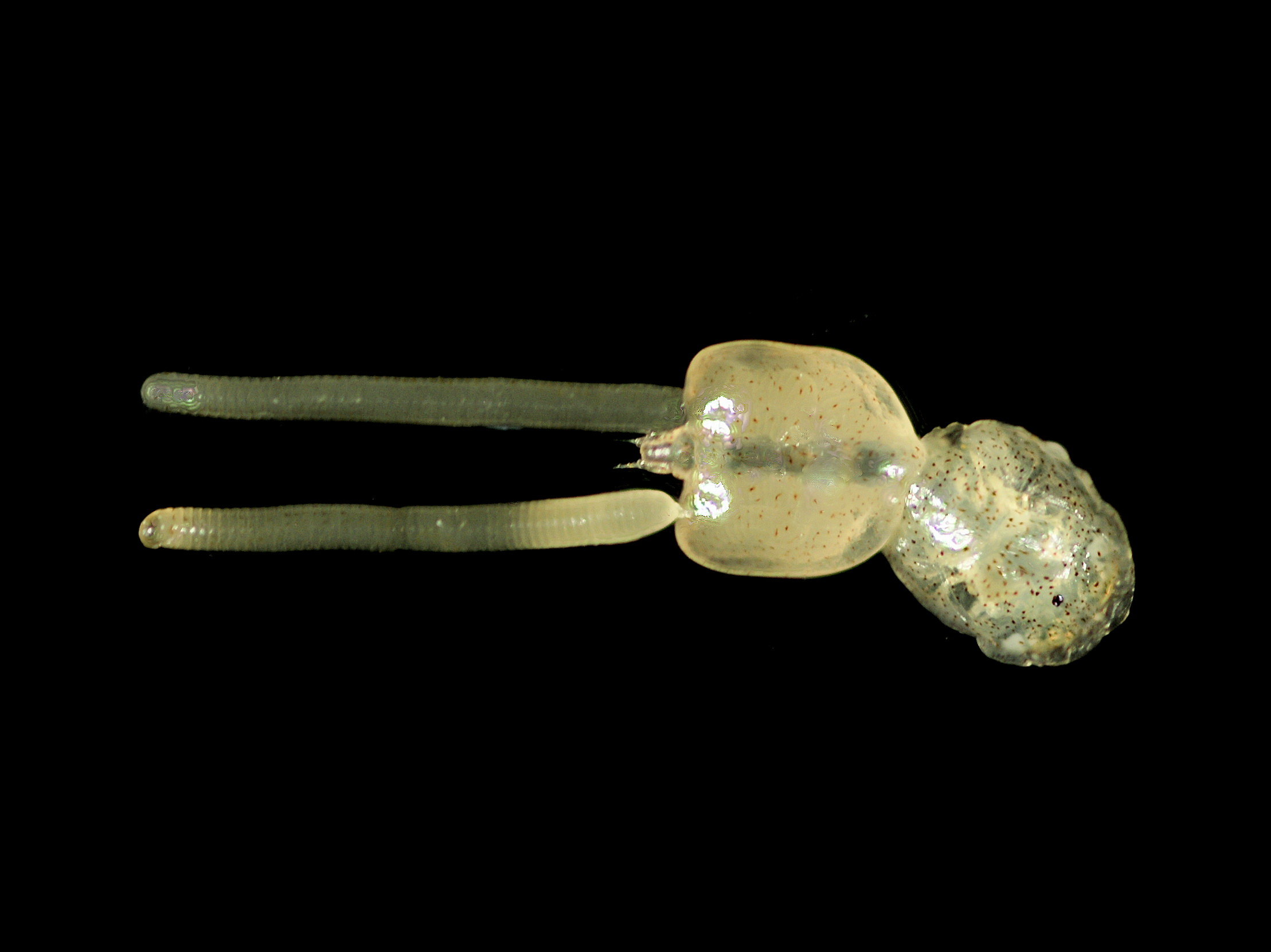

Scientific classification
- Kingdom: Animalia
- Phylum: Arthropoda
- Class: Copepoda
- Order: Siphonostomatoida
- Family: Caligidae
- Genus: Lepeophtheirus
- Species: L. pectoralis

Binomial name
- Lepeophtheirus pectoralis (O. F. Müller, 1776)

Synonyms
- Lernaea pectoralis Müller, 1776; Caligus pectoralis (Müller, 1776)

= Lepeophtheirus pectoralis =

Species of crustacean

Lepeophtheirus pectoralis is a species of parasitic copepod from the northeast Atlantic Ocean, and the type species of the genus Lepeophtheirus. It is a parasite of flatfish, with the European flounder (Platichthys flesus), the plaice (Pleuronectes platessa), and the dab (Limanda limanda) as the most frequent hosts. It feeds on the mucus, skin, and blood of the fish, with egg-producing females infecting the pectoral and pelvic fins of the host, while immature individuals and males are found on the rest of the body.

== Lifecycle ==
Its lifecycle consists of five phases and 10 stages. The first two stages are free-swimming nauplius I and II, while the third stage is the copepodid stage, during which the copepod attaches itself to the fish. Stages IV, V, VI and VII are the chalimus stages, and are followed by the preadult and adult stages, when differentiation of males and females is possible. Multiple generations are apparently produced per year, which show differences in longevity, size, and fecundity.

== See also ==
- Fish diseases and parasites
