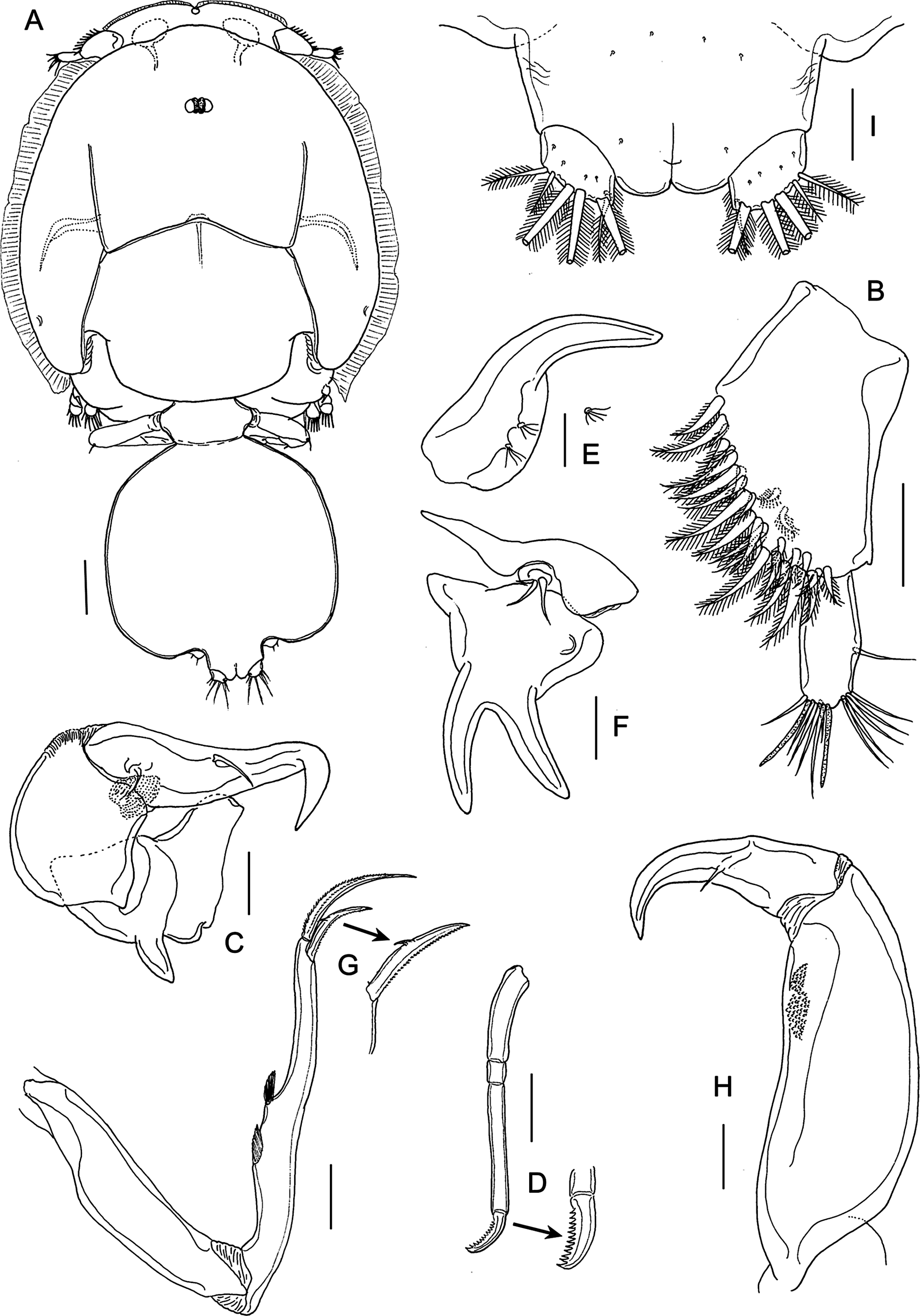
- Adult female: A, habitus, dorsal; B, antennule; C, antenna; D, mandible; E, postantennary process; F, maxillule; G, maxilla; H, maxilliped; I, abdomen, ventral. Scale bars: A = 0.4 mm; B–I = 0.1 mm.

Scientific classification
- Kingdom: Animalia
- Phylum: Arthropoda
- Clade: Pancrustacea
- Class: Copepoda
- Order: Siphonostomatoida
- Family: Caligidae
- Genus: Lepeophtheirus
- Species: L. elegans

Binomial name
- Lepeophtheirus elegans Gusev, 1951

= Lepeophtheirus elegans =

Species of crustacean

Lepeophtheirus elegans is a species of sea lice.

Known fish hosts are the stichaeids Chirolophis japonicus and Pholidapus dybowskii from Russia, Japan and Korea, the pholid Pholis picta and the cottid Myoxocephalus brandtii, both from Russian waters, and the sebastid Sebastes schlegelii, the Korean rockfish.

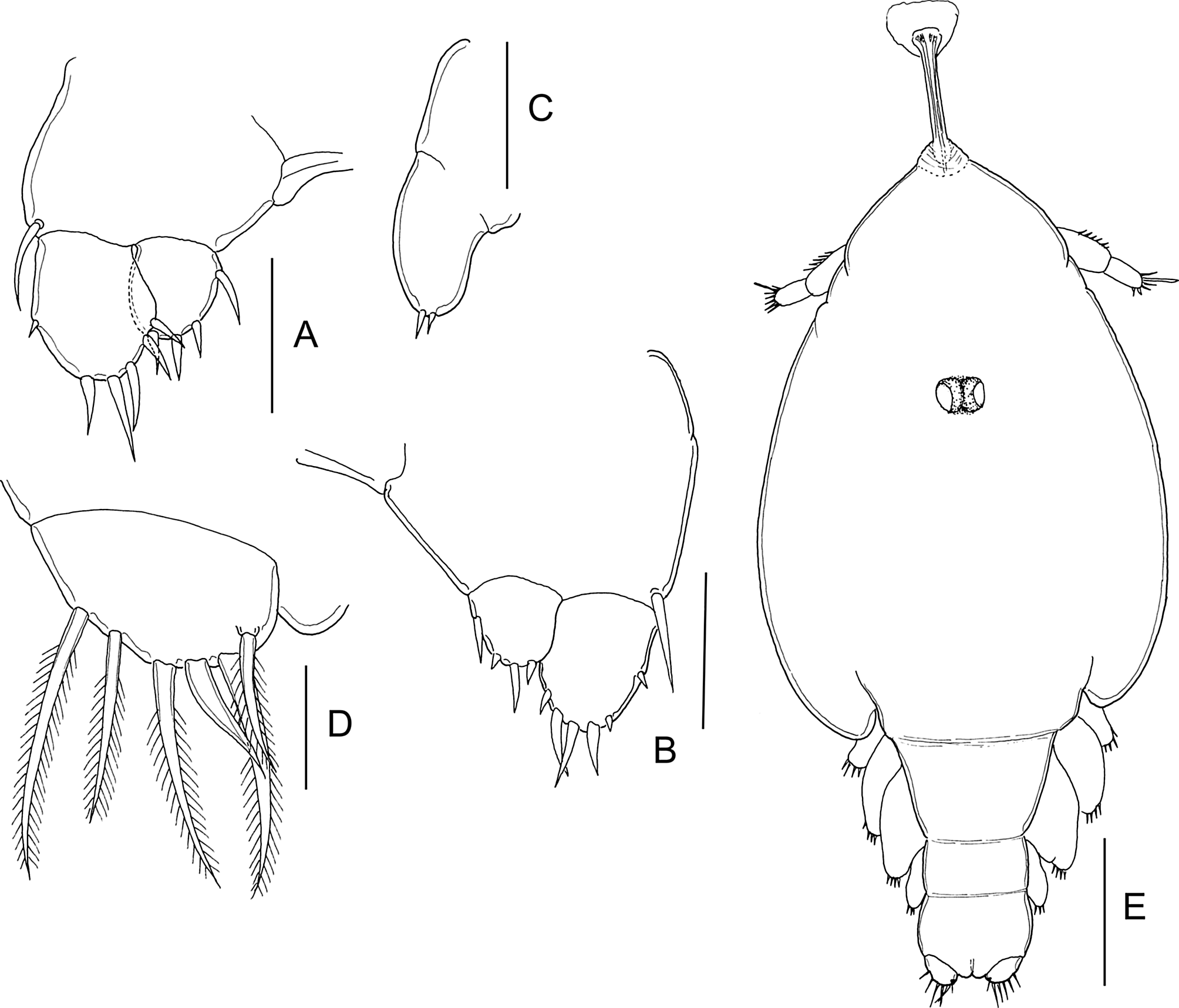
First chalimus: A, leg 3; B, leg 3 (other specimen); C, leg 4; D, caudal ramus; E, habitus of putative female, dorsal. Scale bars: A–D = 0.025 mm; E = 0.2 mm.
