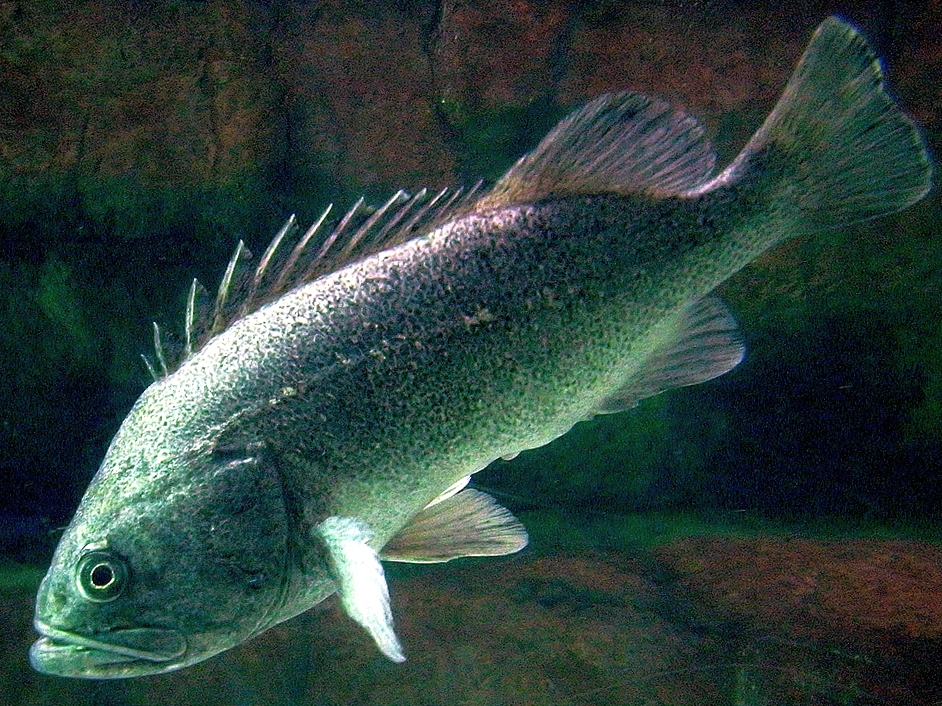

Scientific classification
- Kingdom: Animalia
- Phylum: Chordata
- Class: Actinopterygii
- Division: Teleostei
- Order: Perciformes
- Family: Scorpaenidae
- Genus: Sebastes
- Species: S. schlegelii

Binomial name
- Sebastes schlegelii Hilgendorf, 1880

Synonyms
- Sebastichthys schlegelii (Hilgendorf, 1880)

= Sebastes schlegelii =

Species of fish

Sebastes schlegelii, also known as the Schlegel’s seaperch, Korean rockfish, northern black seaperch, black rockfish, and woo-reok (우럭) in Korean, is a predatory species of marine ray-finned fish belonging to the subfamily Sebastinae, the rockfishes, part of the family Scorpaenidae It is found in the Northwest Pacific Ocean.

== Taxonomy ==
Sebastes schlegeli was first formally described in 1880 by the German zoologist and paleontologist Franz Martin Hilgendorf with the type locality given as Tokyo and Hakodate in Japan. Some authorities place this species in the subgenus Acutomentum, of which it is the type species. The specific name honours the German ornithologist and herpetologist Hermann Schlegel, who, cowrote Fauna Japonica with Coenraad Jacob Temminck in which they reported this species as S. inermis.

== Distribution ==
The species is found in the Northwest Pacific Ocean, off China, the Korean Peninsula and Japan.

== Description ==
S. schlegelii are blackish with black pelvic, anal and caudal fins. The seaperch has a total of 8 weak head spines. It is black when young and turns a mottled gray on the sides with age, often nearing white. This species can vary greatly in size between bodies of water. They can live for up to 18 years, and older individuals are often much larger than average; the maximum recorded length is 60 cm (24 in). The record is 6.6 lb (3 kg).

== Reproduction ==
S. schlegelii is ovoviviparous and breed via internal fertilization, females storing sperm until the development of the eggs. The phases between the start of the process and the end are separated by several months. The majority of the young are reared in late winter to early spring. Females produce between 125,000 and 1,200,000 eggs every breeding season. However it has been noted that not all of the eggs are released every year. It has been occasionally observed that the female may absorb the eggs back into her system.

Along with other close related Sebastes species in the Northwest Pacific Ocean, a duplicated copy of the amh gene (called amhy) is the master sex-determining gene for S. schlegelii. In vitro experiments demonstrate that the overexpression of amhy causes female-to-male sex reversal in S. schlegelii. Further research has suggested that the amhy duplication occurred in the ancestor of Sebastes rockfish but is not used for sex determination in all species.

== Ecology ==
It is a pelagic fish, occurring on the continental shelf. Like other pelagic fish, they spend most of their time amid the water columns and are generally associated with rougher terrain. Juveniles are often associated with rafts of seaweed.

Lepeophtheirus elegans is a species of sea lice reported on S. schlegelii.

== Fishery ==
They make up an important component of nearshore fisheries in northern Asia. The preference of the species for rough terrain can make it somewhat inconvenient for commercial fisheries, which are often situated in nearshore, shallow water, and rocky areas (reefs). The species is a popular quarry for recreational anglers.
