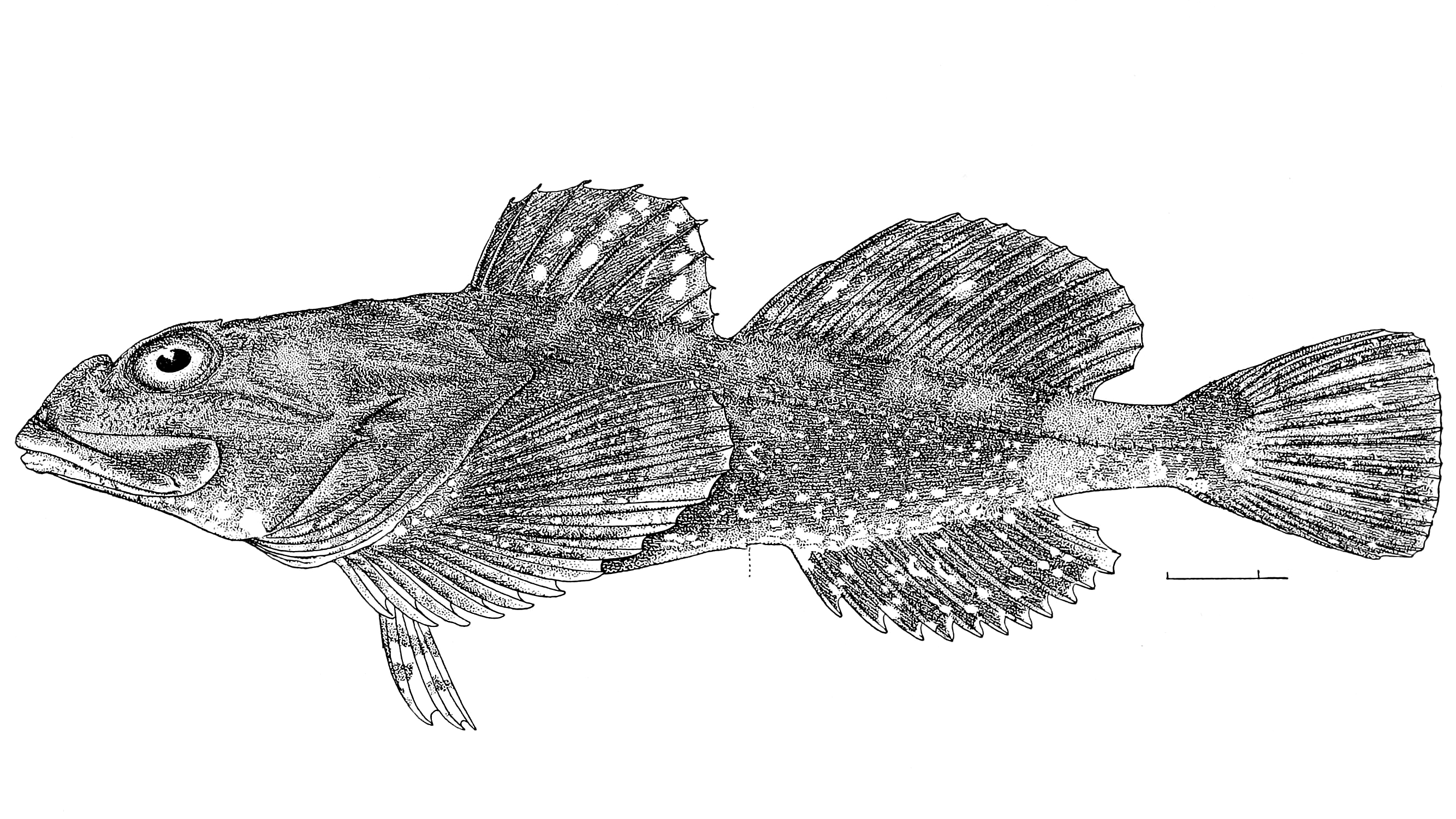

Scientific classification
- Kingdom: Animalia
- Phylum: Chordata
- Class: Actinopterygii
- Division: Teleostei
- Order: Perciformes
- Suborder: Cottoidei
- Family: Psychrolutidae
- Genus: Myoxocephalus
- Species: M. brandtii

Binomial name
- Myoxocephalus brandtii (Steindachner, 1867)

Synonyms
- Cottus brandtii Steindachner, 1867; Myoxocephalus brandti (Steindachner, 1867); Myoxocephalus yesoensis Snyder, 1911

= Myoxocephalus brandtii =

Species of fish

Myoxocephalus brandtii, the snowy sculpin, is a species of marine ray-finned fish belonging to the family Cottidae, the typical sculpins. This species is found in the northwest Pacific, with a range extending from the Sea of Okhotsk to Hokkaido and the Sea of Japan.

== Description ==
Myoxocephalus brandtii was first formally described in 1867 as Cottus brandtii by the Austrian ichthyologist Franz Steindachner with its type locality given as the mouth of the Amur in Russia.

== Etymology ==
The fish is named in honor of German naturalist Johann Friedrich von Brandt (1802–1879).

== Habitat ==
It inhabits relatively shallow coastal waters (less than 60 metres (200 ft)), and can grow to a length of 40 centimetres (16 in).

== Parasites ==
Lepeophtheirus elegans is a species of sea lice reported on M. brandtii.
