= Johann Friedrich von Brandt =

German naturalist (1802–1879)

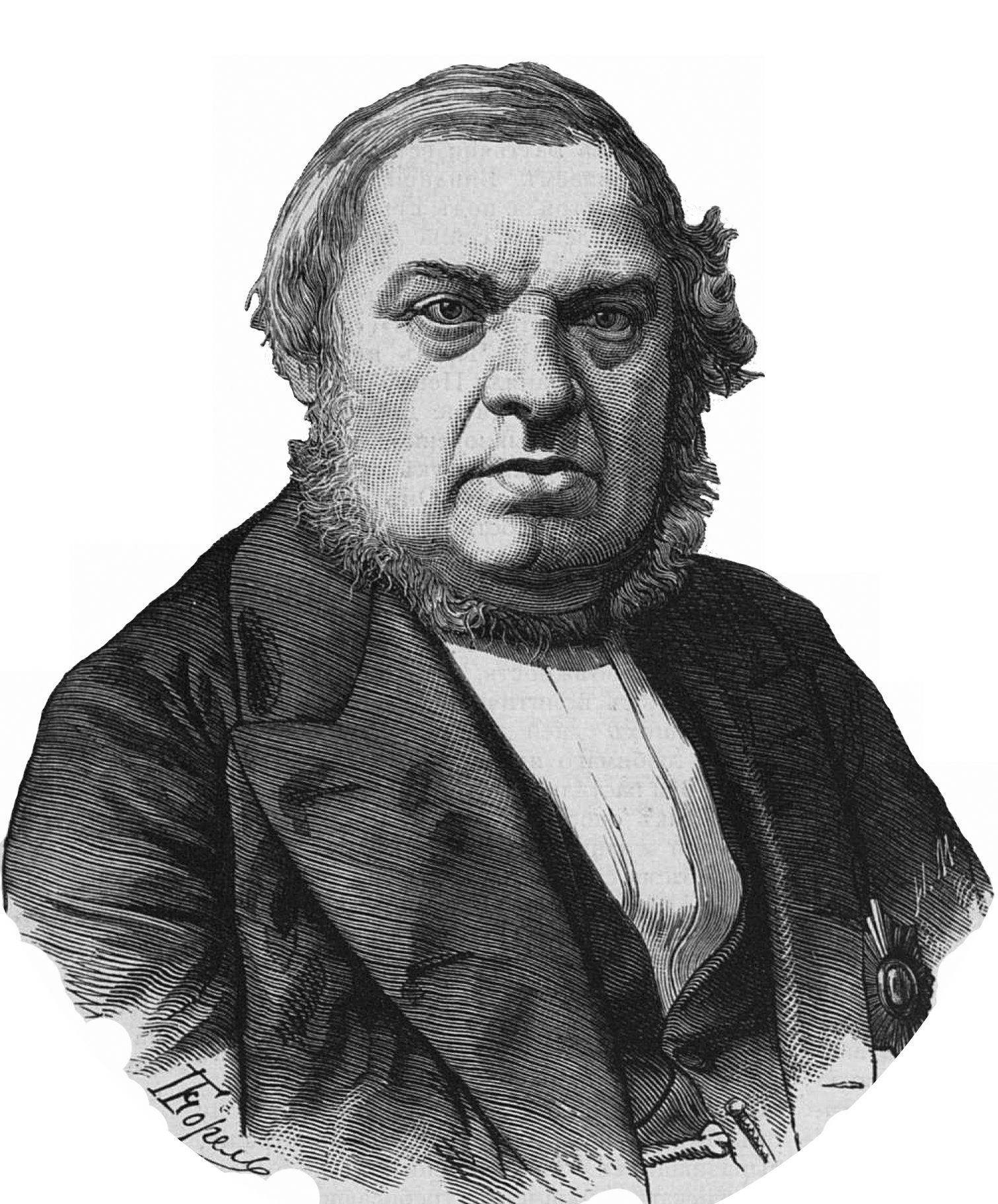
- Born: 25 May 1802; Jüterbog, Kingdom of Prussia
- Died: June 15, 1879 (aged 77); Merreküll, Governorate of Estonia, Russian Empire
- Education: University of Berlin
- Known for: Flora Berolinensis, sive descriptio plantarum phanerogamarum circa Berolinum sponte crescentium vel in agris cultarum additis filicibus et charis (Berlin, 1824), and many others
- Scientific career
- Fields: Zoology, entomology
- Workplaces: St. Petersburg Academy of Sciences
- Author abbrev. (botany): Brandt

Johann Friedrich von Brandt (25 May 1802 – 15 July 1879) was a German-Russian naturalist, who worked mostly in Russia.

Brandt was born in Jüterbog and educated at a gymnasium in Wittenberg and the University of Berlin.

In 1831 he emigrated to Russia, and soon was appointed director of the Zoological Museum of the St Petersburg Academy of Sciences. Brandt encouraged the collection of native animals, many of which were not represented in the museum. Many specimens began to arrive from the expeditions of Severtzov, Przhevalsky, Middendorff, Schrenck and Gustav Radde.

He described several birds collected by Russian explorers off the Pacific Coast of North America, including Brandt's cormorant, red-legged kittiwake and spectacled eider.

As a paleontologist, Brandt ranks among the best. He was also an entomologist, specialising in Coleoptera (beetles) and Diplopoda (millipedes).

He died in Merreküll, Governorate of Estonia.

He is also commemorated in Brandt's bat, Brandt's hedgehog, three other species of mammals, and the lizard Iranolacerta brandtii.

== Works ==
In addition, Johann Friedrich von Brandt concerned the continuation of the work Getreue Darstellung und Beschreibung der in der Arzneykunde gebräuchlichen Gewächse of Friedrich Gottlob Hayne.

- Flora Berolinensis, sive descriptio plantarum phanerogamarum circa Berolinum sponte crescentium vel in agris cultarum additis filicibus et charis (Berlin, 1824)
- Deutschlands phanerogamische Giftgewächse (Berlin, 1828)
- Tabellar Uebersichi d. offizin. Gewächse nach d. Linn. Sexualsystem u. d. natürl. System (Berlin, 1829)
- Medizinische Zoologie oder getreue Darstellung und Beschreibung der Thiere, die in der Arzneimittellehre in Betracht kommen, 2 vols. (Berlin, 1829–1833), written with J. T. C. Ratzeburt
- Uebersicht d. Charactere d. Familien d. offizin. Gewächse nach R. Brown, De Candolle, Jussieu,… (Berlin, 1830)
- Deutschlands kryptogamische Giftgewächse (Berlin, 1838)
- Deutschlands phanerogamische Geftgewächse as Abbildung und Beschreibung der in Deutschland wild wachsenden und in Gärten in freien ausdauernden Giftgewächse, nach natürlichen Familien erläutert, mit Beiträgen von P. Phoebus und J. T. C. Ratzeburg (Berlin, 1838)
- Symbolae Sirenologicae quibus praecipue Rhutinae historia naturalis illustratur (St. Petersburg, 1846)
- Symbolae Sirenologicae…, fasc. 2 and 3 (St. Petersburg, 1861–1868)
- Mémoires de l’Académie impériale des sciences, St. Pétersbourg, 7th ser., 12, no. 1; Untersuchungen über die fossilen und subfossilen Cetaceen Europa’s mit Beiträgen von Van Beneden, Cornalia, Gastaldi, Quenstedt, und Paulson, nebst einem geologischen Anhange von Barbot de Marny, G. von Helmersen, A. Goebel und Th. Fuchs, ibid., 20, no. 1 (1873)
- Ergänzungen, ibid., 21, no. 6 (1874)
- Bericht über die Fortschritte, welche die zoologischen Wissenschaften den von der kaiserlichen Akademie der Wissenschaften zu St. Petersburg von 1831 bis 1879 herausgegeben Schriften verdanken (St. Petersburg, 1879)
- J. F. Brandtii index operum omnium (St. Petersburg, 1876), issued as a Festschrift.
- Getreue Darstellung und Beschreibung der in der Arzneykunde gebräuchlichen Gewächse wie auch solcher, welche mit ihnen verwechselt werden können. 12 Volumes, 1805–1856 (continued from Johann Friedrich Brandt, Julius Theodor Christian Ratzeburg und Johann Friedrich Klotzsch). Digital Edition by the University and State Library Düsseldorf
- Abbildung und Beschreibung der in Deutschland wild wachsenden und in Gärten im Freien ausdauernden Giftgewächse nach natürlichen Familien erläutert. Band 1: Phanerogamen Hirschwald, Berlin 1834 Digital edition by the University and State Library Düsseldorf
- Abbildung und Beschreibung der in Deutschland wild wachsenden und in Gärten im Freien ausdauernden Giftgewächse nach natürlichen Familien erläutert. Band 2: Kryptogamen Hirschwald, Berlin 1838 Digital edition by the University and State Library Düsseldorf
- Untersuchungen über die fossilen und subfossilen cetaceen Europa's. Mémoires de L'Académie Impériale des Sciences de Saint-Petersbourg, Series 7 20(1):1-372 1873

== Taxa described by Brandt ==
=== Genera ===
- Hemisyntrachelus

=== Species ===
- Acipenser baerii Brandt, 1869 (Siberian sturgeon)
- Acipenser guldenstadti Brandt & Ratzeburg, 1833 (Caspian or Russian sturgeon)
- Acipenser schrenckii Brandt, 1869 (Amur sturgeon)
- Chrysaora Fuscescens Brandt, 1835 (Pacific sea nettle)
- Emberiza bruniceps Brandt, 1841 (Red-headed bunting)
- Emberiza cioides Brandt, 1843 (Meadow bunting)
- Holothuria leucospilota Brandt, 1835 (black long sea cucumber)
- Idotea ochotensis Brandt, 1851
- Lasiopodomys brandtii (Radde, 1861) (Brandt's vole)
- Ligia dilatata Brandt, 1833 (sea slater)
- Metridium farcimen Brandt, 1835 (Giant Plumose Anemone)
- Mesocricetus brandti (Nehring, 1898) (Brandt's or Turkish hamster)
- Myotis brandtii Eversmann, 1845 (Brandt's bat)
- Paraechinus hypomelas (Brandt, 1836) (Brandt's hedgehog)
- Urile penicillatus (Brandt, 1837) (Brandt's cormorant)
- Porphyrophora hamelii Brandt, 1833 (Armenian cochineal)
- Somateria fischeri Brandt, 1847 (spectacled eider)
- Stichopus chloronotus Brandt, 1835 (black sea cucumber)
- Trionyx maackii Brandt, 1858 (Chinese softshell turtle)

== Taxon named in his honor ==
- The Pacific redfin, Pseudaspius brandtii is a species of ray-finned fish belonging to the family Leuciscidae, which includes the daces, chubs, true minnows and related fishes. It is found from the Siberian Pacific Coast through coastal Japan.
- Myoxocephalus brandtii (Steindachner 1867) the snowy sculpin, is a species of marine ray-finned fish belonging to the family Cottidae, the typical sculpins. This species is found in the northwest Pacific, with a range extending from the Sea of Okhotsk to Hokkaido and the Sea of Japan.
- The Kura loach, Oxynoemacheilus brandtii (Kessler 1877) also known as the Caspian sportive loach, is an Asian species of freshwater fish, occurring in the drainage basin of the Kura in Armenia, Azerbaijan, Turkey and Iran.
- Serrasalmus brandtii Lütken 1875
