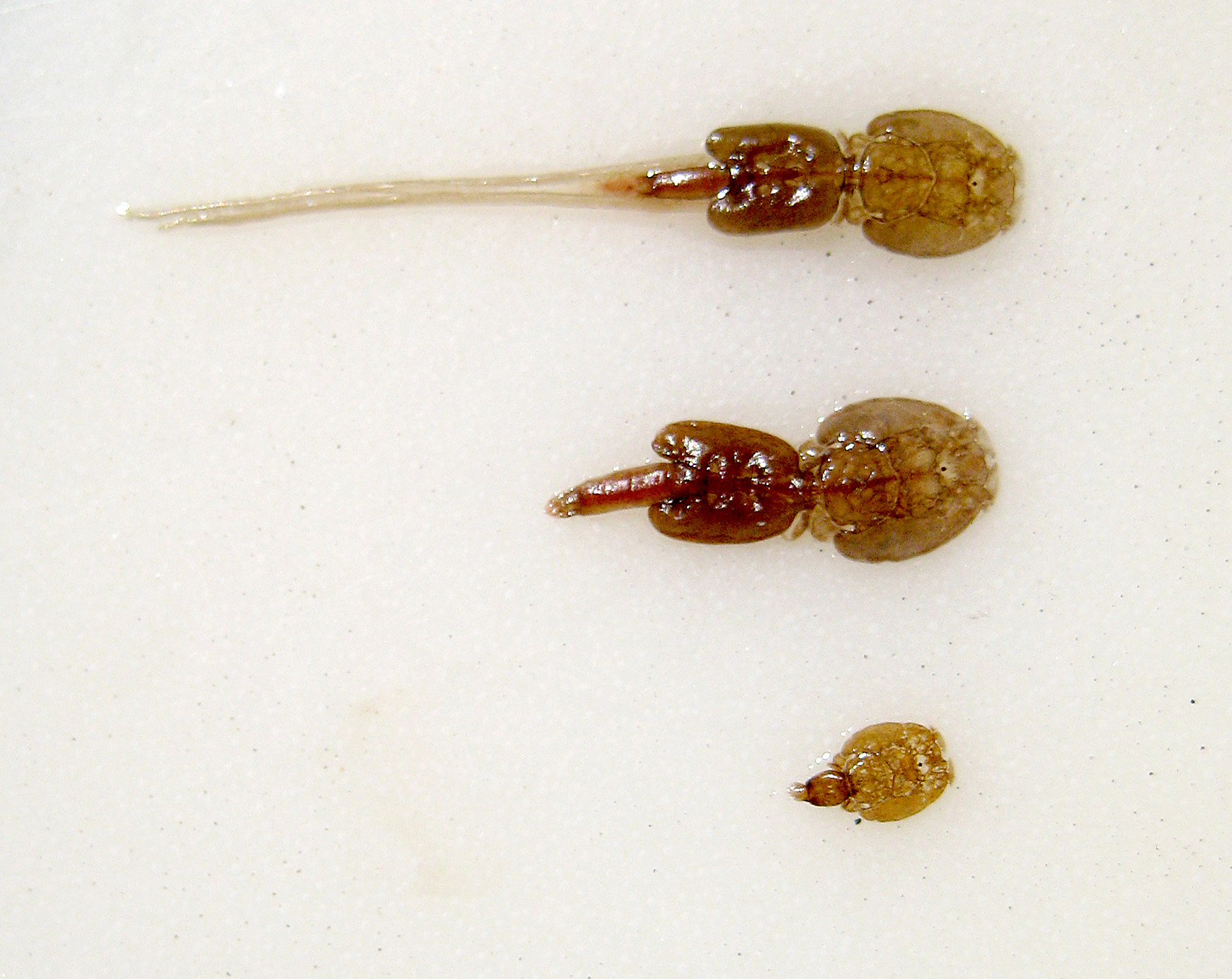

Scientific classification
- Kingdom: Animalia
- Phylum: Arthropoda
- Clade: Pancrustacea
- Class: Copepoda
- Order: Siphonostomatoida
- Family: Caligidae
- Genus: Lepeophtheirus
- Species: L. salmonis

Binomial name
- Lepeophtheirus salmonis (Krøyer, 1837)

Synonyms
- Caligus pacificus Gissler, 1883; Caligus salmonis Krøyer, 1837; Caligus stroemii Baird, 1847; Caligus vespa Milne-Edwards, 1840; Lepeophtheirus pacificus (Gissler, 1883); Lepeophtheirus stroemii (Baird, 1847); Lepeophtheirus uenoi Yamaguti, 1939

= Salmon louse =

Parasitic crustacean of fish

The salmon louse (Lepeophtheirus salmonis) is a species of copepod in the genus Lepeophtheirus. It is a sea louse, a parasite living mostly on salmon, particularly on Pacific and Atlantic salmon and sea trout, but is also sometimes found on the three-spined stickleback. It feeds on the mucus, skin and blood of the fish. Once detached, they can be blown by wind across the surface of the sea, like plankton. When they encounter a suitable marine fish host, they adhere themselves to the skin, fins, or gills of the fish, and feed on the mucus or skin. Sea lice only affect fish and are not harmful to humans.

Salmon lice are ectoparasites of salmon. In the 1980s, high levels of salmon lice were observed on pink salmon smolts. Salmon lice are found in the Pacific and Atlantic Oceans; they infect pink salmon, Atlantic salmon, and chum salmon.

== Life cycle ==
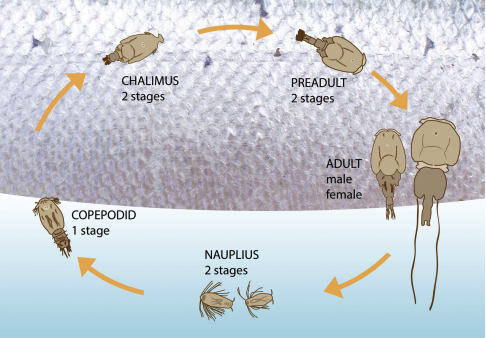
The five phases of the salmon louse life cycle Each phase comprises one or two life stages (not shown here). Scaled to size. Nauplius typically are of length 0.5–0.6 mm (0.020–0.024 in), copepodids 0.7 mm (0.028 in), chalimi 1.1–2.3 mm (0.043–0.091 in), preadults 3.4–5.2 mm (0.13–0.20 in) and adults 5–6 mm (0.20–0.24 in) (males) and 8–12 mm (0.31–0.47 in) (females).

Some research has occurred on the problems caused by this species in aquaculture, but little is known about the salmon louse's life in nature. Salmon louse infections in fish farming facilities, though, can cause epizootics in wild fish. When aquaculturalists place their post smolts into sea water, they are commonly known to be ectoparasite free, and this can last for many months.

L. salmonis has a direct lifecycle (i.e. a single host) with eight life stages with ecdysis in between. These planktonic nauplii cannot swim directionally against the water current, but drift passively, and have the ability to adjust their depth in the water column. They are almost translucent in colour and are about 0.5–0.6 mm (0.020–0.024 in) long.

At 5 °C (41 °F), the nauplius 1 stage lasts about 52 hours, and about 9 hours at 15 °C (59 °F). Nauplius 2 takes 170 hours and 36 hours at these temperatures, respectively. They are responsive to light and salinity. Low salinities appear to have a greater effect on the planktonic stages than on the parasitic stages. Newly hatched larvae do not survive below salinities of 15‰ and poor development to the infective copepodid occurs between 20 and 25‰. Nauplii and copepodids are positively phototactic and exhibit a daily vertical migration, rising during the day and sinking at night. The ability to find their hosts is not light dependent. They are responsive to low-frequency water accelerations, such as those produced by a swimming fish. Finding their migratory hosts in the vastness of the ocean is still a mystery for scientists to solve, but the species has managed to do this effectively for millennia.

The third stage is the copepodid stage, in which the length is about 0.7 mm (0.028 in) and could take 2 to 14 days depending on water temperature, and the salmon louse attaches itself to the fish.

Stages four and five are the chalimus stages. The salmon louse becomes mobile and can move around the surface of fish and can also swim in the water column, and grows to a length of 1.1 mm (0.043 in) for the stage four, and 2.3 mm (0.091 in) for stage five. Chalimus stage I can last up to 10 days and Chalimus stage II can last for up to 15 days.

Stages six and seven are called the pre-adult phase. Pre-adult stage I lasts typically 10 days for females, and 8 days for males. Pre-adult stage II typically lasts 12 days for females and 9 days for males at 10 °C (50 °F). Pre-adult stages measure in length from 3.4 to 5.2 mm (0.13 to 0.20 in).

The two preadult stages are followed by the fully mature adult phase. In the preadult stages, the genital complex is underdeveloped and the mean length is about 3.6 mm (0.14 in). Final moults to adult stages, both male and female, then take place. The female is larger than the male, with males measuring 5–6 mm (0.20–0.24 in) and females 8–18 mm (0.31–0.71 in). Female adults can produce 10-11 pairs of egg strings over their lifecycle. Mean egg numbers per string (fecundity) have been recorded as 152 (+16) with a range from 123 to 183 at 7.2 °C (45.0 °F).

The development to sexual maturity following attachment to the host fish depends on water temperature and the generation time, from egg to mature adult, and ranges from 32 days at 15 °C (59 °F) to 106 days at 7.5 °C (45.5 °F). Egg strings tend to be longer with higher fecundity at lower temperatures, but factors affecting egg production are poorly understood.

The sea louse generation time is around 8–9 weeks at 6 °C (43 °F), 6 weeks at 9 °C (48 °F), and 4 weeks at 18 °C (64 °F). The lifespan of the adult under natural conditions has not been determined, but under laboratory conditions, females have lived for up to 210 days.

== Description ==
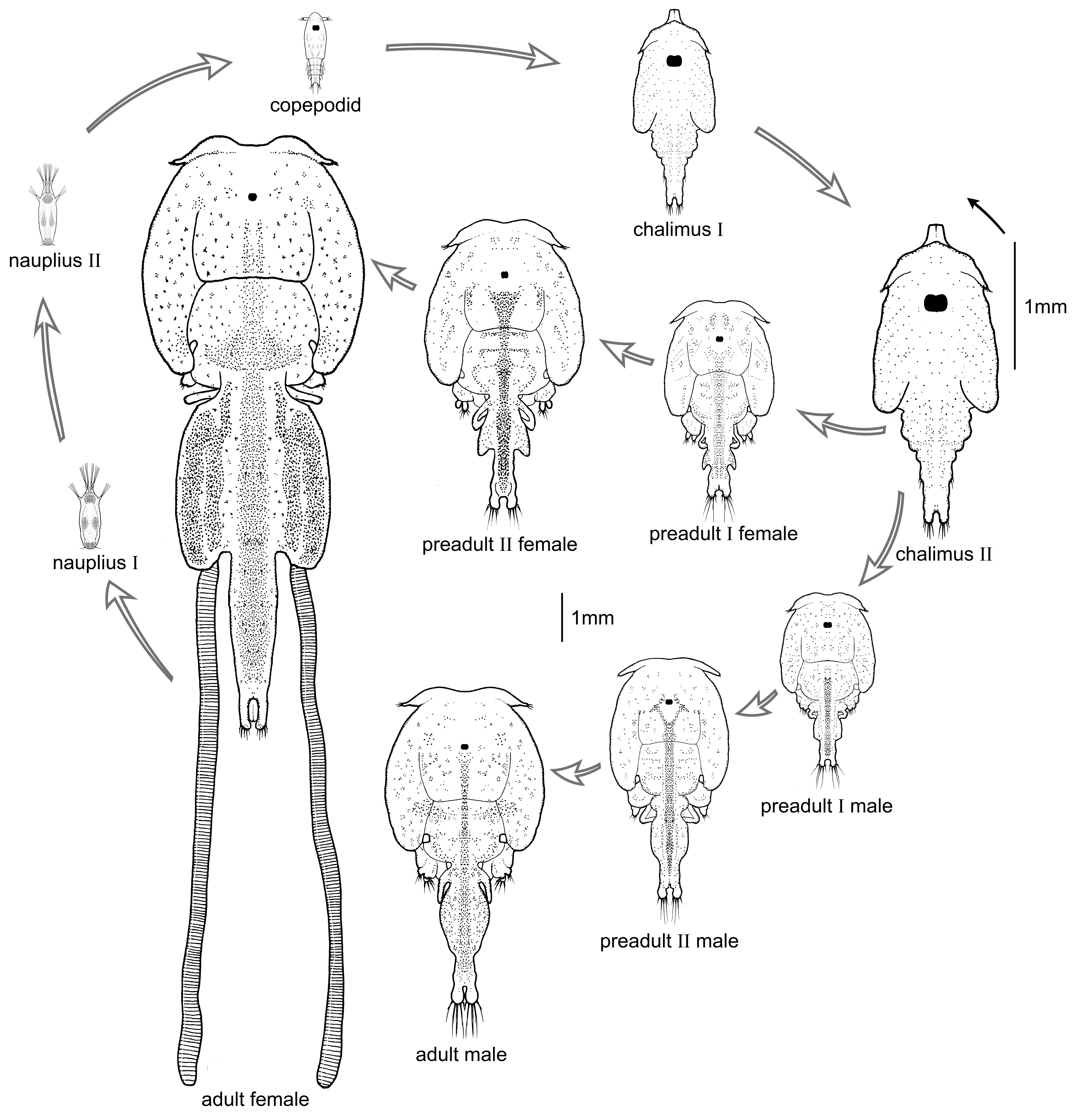
The eight life stages of the salmon louse Male and female salmon lice cannot be distinguished by the naked eye in the Nauplius, Copepodid and Chalimus stages. First in the larger (note different scale) pre-adult and adult stages, sex determination by visual inspection is possible.

The thorax is broad and shield shaped. The abdomen is narrower, and in the females, filled with eggs. The females also have two long egg strings attached to the abdomen. The salmon louse uses its feet to move around on the host or to swim from one host to another.

== Effects on salmon farms ==
This parasite is one of the major threats to salmon farmers. Salmon are stocked usually for a 14 - 18-month cycle. Salmon farms are an unusual, but ideal environment for the sea lice to breed and proliferate. The infestations of sea lice in salmon farms increases the number of lice in the rest of the surrounding water dramatically if the eggs from the gravid louse are allowed to disperse. Sea lice can also attach to juvenile salmon migrating from rivers to the ocean if they pass by fish farms.

The salmon louse currently infests nearly half of Scotland's salmon farms. In 2016 Guardian news stated that the lice killed thousands of tonnes of farmed fish, caused skin lesions and secondary infections in millions more, and cost the Scottish salmon industry around £300m in control efforts.

=== Mitigation efforts ===
Salmon lice is one of the major challenges in today's salmon farming. It is possible to use several methods to increase its resistance against salmon lice.

Genomic selection (GS) is a form of Molecular breeding and has become a very popular selection method, used in most livestock species, but also in several important aquaculture species, like salmon and tilapia. It offers higher selection accuracy than selection based on phenotypes and pedigree records alone. However, genetic progress in selective breeding is limited by the heritability of the measured traits, the generation interval of the species, and the need to target several traits in the breeding target. In addition, advanced breeding programs are normally closed systems, and are limited to the existing genetic variation in the broodstock, and new variation that arises from the novo mutations. CRISPR is one of the methods that then offers new solutions and opportunities.

CRISPR is characterised as a GMO-light method, since it does not necessarily mean that a new gene is introduced, it may for instance only have been repaired, if a harmful mutation has occurred. GMO stands for genetically modified organism. There is a big and global debate about what should be defined as genetic modification. In several countries (e.g. USA, Canada and Brazil), genetically modified fish is allowed to be sold as food today. In Norway, CRISPR has only been used in research so far, and genetic modification is strictly regulated by the Gene Technology Act.

GMO could be a part of the solution for the salmon lice problem. The challenge is that lice resistance has a polygenic inheritance, and a low-to-moderate heritability, but with CRISPR technology we have the opportunity to go beyond the existing alleles and genome of the Atlantic salmon and use genomic material from for instance coho or pink salmon, which show almost complete lice resistance.

CRISPR is a method used on an organism to change the DNA structure. There are several ways this can be done. A gene can be changed, pasted from another organisms, turned off, or knocked out. "Knocked–out" genes may cause other genes to compensate. Turning off the gene is the least complicated procedure. Turning off the gene often gives the same result that it is possible to achieve through breeding, but it's faster. It is also more probable that animals with small changes can become human food.

Another use of CRISPR is escape-safe farmed salmon, since researchers now have succeeded in turning off a gene that prevents salmon from developing germ cells. The salmon without germ cells can not harm the local salmon strains genetically, even though it can still escape. However, this method is still not scalable to serve as a practical solution to all salmon produced for aquaculture purpose.

A device has been developed which uses lasers directed by machine vision to "zap" and kill the lice. Salmon louses can also be removed through chemical baths.

== Disease ==
In small numbers, salmon lice cause little damage to a fish although if populations increase on a fish, this can lead to death. The parasites can cause physical damage to the fish's fins, skin erosion, constant bleeding, and open wounds creating pathways for other pathogens. The sea lice may also act as a vector for diseases between wild and farmed salmon. These copepod vectors have caused infectious salmon anemia (ISA) along the Atlantic coast. An outbreak of ISA occurred in Chile during 2007 where it spread quickly from one farm to another, destroying the salmon farms.

Salmon lice infection in pink salmon weakens ionic homeostasis in pink salmon smolts. Homeostasis is needed for the internal regulation of body temperature and pH levels; the process allows fish to travel from fresh water to sea water. Disruption of ionic homeostasis in pre-mature smolt stages can result in reductions in growth rate, limit swimming capabilities, and even death. Disturbances in hydro mineral balance can result in negative consequences at the cellular, tissue, and organism levels. High levels of salmon lice infections result in a weaker ion regulation system.

The ability to activate an inflammatory response is a way to combat salmon lice infection. The intensity of inflammatory response controls how fast the parasites are rejected from the body. Intensity is determined by recognition of and regulation by salmon lice secretory/excretory products (SEP), which include proteases and prostaglandin E2. The marine parasite secretes SEP into the damaged skin of the salmon which inhibits proteolytic activity. Proteolytic activity increases the amount of host peptides and amino acids that can be used as a source of nutrition and lowers the intensity of inflammatory responses.

== Genome ==
The salmon louse genome has been sequenced using various platforms and independent genome assemblies have been made, including two at chromosome level that yielded assemblies ranging from 665 to 790 Megabase pairs (Mbp) length.

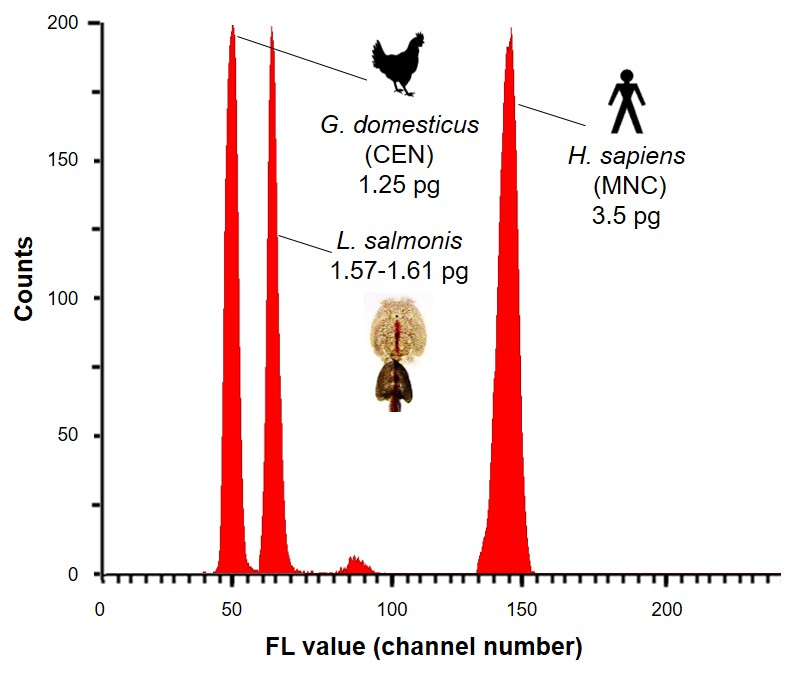
Nuclear DNA content of salmon louse. Flow cytometry histograms of fluorescent stained (Propidium Iodide, PI) cells of salmon louse mixed with chicken erythrocytes (CEN) and human mono-nucleated cells (MCN) used as internal reference standards. Fluorescence (FL) peaks values on the X-axis are reported in arbitrary units expressed as fluorescence channel numbers (FL value). Values on the Y-axis (counts) refer to the number of nuclei counted per channel. pg= picograms of DNA (haploid, 1C).

Two cytometric techniques, flow cytometry (FCM) and Feulgen image analysis densitometry (FIAD), gave measurements of 1.3–1.6 Gigabase pairs (Gb) in the haploid genome corresponding to a nuclear DNA weight of 1.35-1.61 picograms (pg) with differences between sexes. FIAD derived estimates were of 1.35 and 1.45 picograms (pg) DNA while FCM analyses estimated a size of 1.57 and 1.61 pg for adult females and males, respectively. Male genome size has been shown to be consistently slightly larger than female genome size due to erosion of the W-chromosome in the heterozygotic female.

Available data suggest that the genome sizes of salmon lice are variable and that sequence-based methods underestimate the genome size by approximately 33%. The most plausible explanation for this discrepancy may be that repetitive elements cause sequencing approaches to underestimate genome size as reported for beetles (Coleoptera).

== See also ==
- Aquaculture of salmon
- Atlantic salmon
- Fish diseases and parasites
- Pacific salmon
- Salmon
