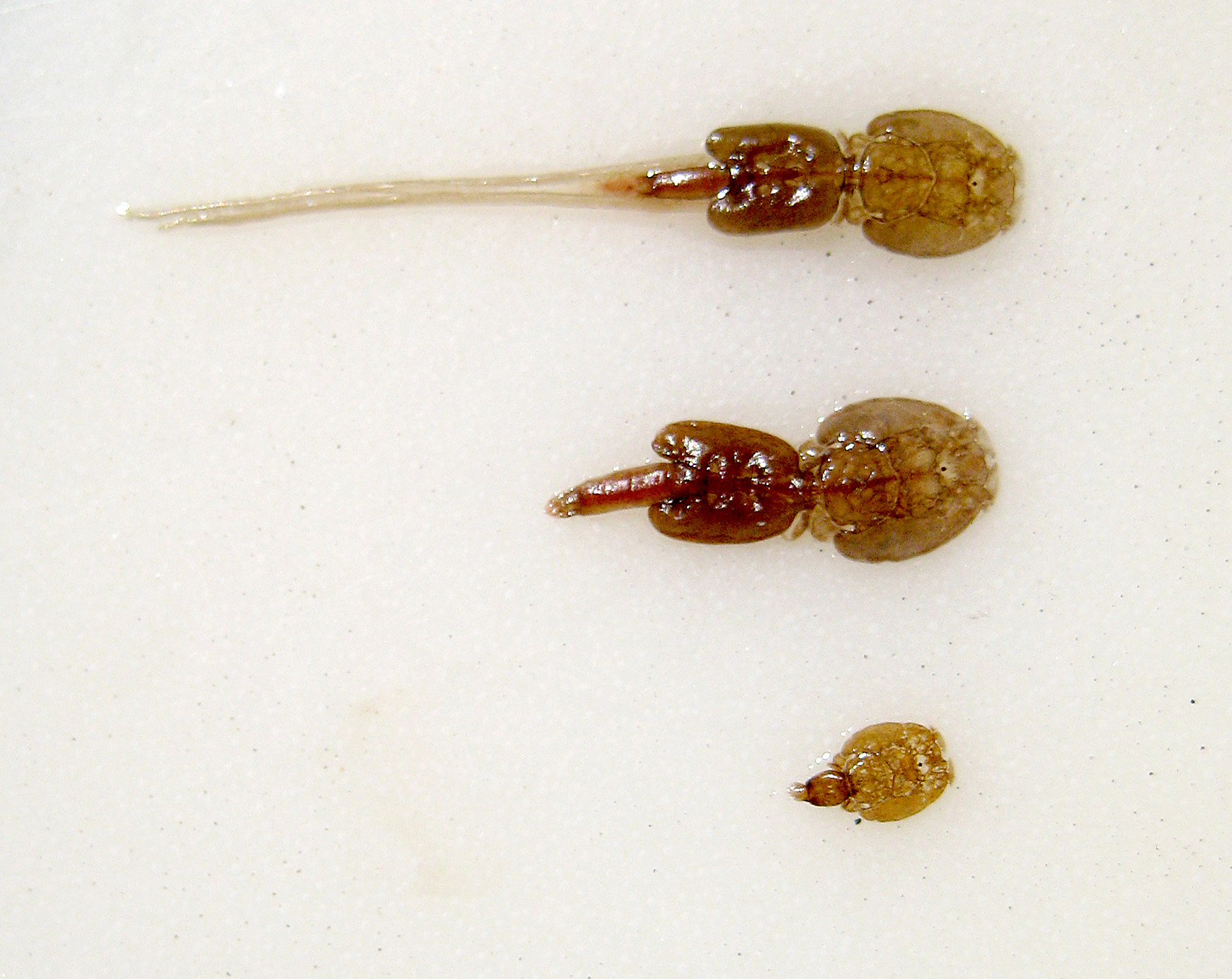
- L. salmonis, salmon louse

Scientific classification
- Kingdom: Animalia
- Phylum: Arthropoda
- Class: Copepoda
- Order: Siphonostomatoida
- Family: Caligidae
- Genus: Lepeophtheirus; Nordmann, 1832

Type species
- Lepeophtheirus pectoralis (O. F. Müller, 1776)

Synonyms
- Chalimus Burmeister, 1834; Dentigryps C. B. Wilson, 1913; Homoiotes C. B. Wilson, 1905; Indocaligus Pillai, 1961; Lepeophteirus Nordmann, 1832; Pseudolepeophtheirus Markevich, 1940

= Lepeophtheirus =

Genus of crustaceans

Lepeophtheirus is a genus of sea louse. The best-known species is L. salmonis, the salmon louse. Other species include L. pectoralis, which uses flatfish as its host, particularly the European flounder, and is also the type species of the genus Lepeophtheirus.

== Species ==
Lepeophtheirus contains 122 species:

- Lepeophtheirus acutus Heegaard, 1943
- Lepeophtheirus aesopus C. B. Wilson, 1906
- Lepeophtheirus alvaroi Suárez-Morales & Gasca, 2012
- Lepeophtheirus anguilli Hameed, 1976
- Lepeophtheirus appendiculatus Krøyer, 1863
- Lepeophtheirus argentus Hewitt, 1963
- Lepeophtheirus atypicus Lin et al., 1996
- Lepeophtheirus bagri Dana, 1849
- Lepeophtheirus bifidus Fraser, 1920
- Lepeophtheirus bifurcatus C. B. Wilson, 1905
- Lepeophtheirus bonaci Pearse, 1952
- Lepeophtheirus brachyurus Heller, 1865
- Lepeophtheirus breviventris Fraser, 1920
- Lepeophtheirus bychowskyi Gusev, 1951
- Lepeophtheirus chaenichthyis (Cunningham, 1871)
- Lepeophtheirus chantoni Gusev, 1951
- Lepeophtheirus chilensis C. B. Wilson, 1905
- Lepeophtheirus clarionensis Shiino, 1959
- Lepeophtheirus confusum González, Castro, Muñoz & López, 2016
- Lepeophtheirus constrictus C. B. Wilson, 1908
- Lepeophtheirus cossyphi Krøyer, 1863
- Lepeophtheirus crabro Krøyer, 1863
- Lepeophtheirus crassus (Bere, 1936)
- Lepeophtheirus cuneifer Kabata, 1974
- Lepeophtheirus curtus (C. B. Wilson, 1913)
- Lepeophtheirus dissimulatus C. B. Wilson, 1905
- Lepeophtheirus distinctus Hewitt, 1963
- Lepeophtheirus edwardsi C. B. Wilson, 1905
- Lepeophtheirus elegans Gusev, 1951
- Lepeophtheirus eminens C. B. Wilson, 1944
- Lepeophtheirus epinepheli Ho & Dojiri, 1977
- Lepeophtheirus erecsoni G. M. Thomson, 1891
- Lepeophtheirus etelisi Ho, Chiang & Lin, 2009
- Lepeophtheirus europaensis Zeddam et al., 1988
- Lepeophtheirus exilipes Ho & Lin, 2003
- Lepeophtheirus exsculptus Fischer, 1860
- Lepeophtheirus formosanus Ho & Lin, 2010
- Lepeophtheirus frecuens Castro-Romero & Baeza-Kuroki, 1984
- Lepeophtheirus furcatus (Capart, 1953)
- Lepeophtheirus goniistii Yamaguti, 1936
- Lepeophtheirus grohmanni Krøyer, 1863
- Lepeophtheirus hapalogenyos Yamaguti& Yamasu, 1959
- Lepeophtheirus hastatus Shiino, 1960
- Lepeophtheirus heegaardi Hewitt, 1963
- Lepeophtheirus hexagrammi Gusev, 1951
- Lepeophtheirus hidekoi Ho, 1962
- Lepeophtheirus hippoglossi (Krøyer, 1837)
- Lepeophtheirus histiopteridi Kazachenko et al., 1972
- Lepeophtheirus hospitalis Fraser, 1920
- Lepeophtheirus hummi Pearse, 1952
- Lepeophtheirus intercurreus Krøyer, 1863
- Lepeophtheirus interitus C. B. Wilson, 1921
- Lepeophtheirus kabatai Ho & Dojiri, 1977
- Lepeophtheirus kareii Yamaguti, 1936
- Lepeophtheirus krishnai Kaliyamurthy, 1990
- Lepeophtheirus lagocephali Pillai, 1963
- Lepeophtheirus lalandei Kensley & Grindley, 1973
- Lepeophtheirus lateolabraxi Shen, 1958
- Lepeophtheirus latigenitalis Pillai & Natarajan, 1977
- Lepeophtheirus lewisi Hewitt, 1971
- Lepeophtheirus lichiae Barnard, 1948
- Lepeophtheirus litus (A. G. Lewis, 1964)
- Lepeophtheirus longiabdominalis Shiino, 1961
- Lepeophtheirus longicaudus (Cressey, 1966)
- Lepeophtheirus longipalpus Bassett-Smith, 1898
- Lepeophtheirus longipes C. B. Wilson, 1905
- Lepeophtheirus longispinosus C. B. Wilson, 1908
- Lepeophtheirus longiventralis Yü & Wu, 1932
- Lepeophtheirus marcepes C. B. Wilson, 1944
- Lepeophtheirus marginatus Bere, 1936
- Lepeophtheirus molvae Milne-Edwards, 1836
- Lepeophtheirus monacanthus Heller, 1865
- Lepeophtheirus mugiloidis Villalba, 1986
- Lepeophtheirus muraenae Shiino, 1960
- Lepeophtheirus nanaimoensis C. B. Wilson, 1912
- Lepeophtheirus natalensis Kensley & Grindley, 1973
- Lepeophtheirus nordmanni (Milne-Edwards, 1840)
- Lepeophtheirus oblitus Kabata, 1973
- Lepeophtheirus palliatus (C. B. Wilson, 1905)
- Lepeophtheirus paralichthydis Yamaguti & Yamasu, 1960
- Lepeophtheirus parvicruris Fraser, 1920
- Lepeophtheirus parviventris C. B. Wilson, 1905
- Lepeophtheirus parvulus Shiino, 1952
- Lepeophtheirus parvus C. B. Wilson, 1908
- Lepeophtheirus paulus Cressey, 1969
- Lepeophtheirus pectoralis (O. F. Müller, 1776)
- Lepeophtheirus perpes Leigh-Sharpe, 1934
- Lepeophtheirus pharaonis (Nordmann, 1832)
- Lepeophtheirus platensis Thomsen, 1949
- Lepeophtheirus plectropomi Nuñes-Ruivo, 1956
- Lepeophtheirus plotosi Barnard, 1948
- Lepeophtheirus pollachius Bassett-Smith, 1896
- Lepeophtheirus polyprioni Hewitt, 1963
- Lepeophtheirus pravipes C. B. Wilson, 1912
- Lepeophtheirus quadratus Krøyer, 1863
- Lepeophtheirus remiopsis Dojiri, 1979
- Lepeophtheirus renalis (Heegaard, 1945)
- Lepeophtheirus rhinobati Luque et al., 1999
- Lepeophtheirus robustus Krøyer, 1863
- Lepeophtheirus rotundatus Brian, 1932
- Lepeophtheirus rotundipes Dojiri, 1979
- Lepeophtheirus rotundiventris Bassett-Smith, 1898
- Lepeophtheirus salmonis (Krøyer, 1837)
- Lepeophtheirus scutiger Shiino, 1952
- Lepeophtheirus sekii Yamaguti, 1936
- Lepeophtheirus selkirki Atria, 1969
- Lepeophtheirus semicossyphi Yamaguti, 1939
- Lepeophtheirus sheni Boxshall & Bellwood, 1981
- Lepeophtheirus shiinoi Prabha & Pillai, 1986
- Lepeophtheirus sigani Ho et al., 2004
- Lepeophtheirus simplex Ho et al., 2001
- Lepeophtheirus spatha Dojiri & Brantley, 1991
- Lepeophtheirus spinifer Kirtisinghe, 1937
- Lepeophtheirus sturionis (Krøyer, 1837)
- Lepeophtheirus suhmi Brady, 1883
- Lepeophtheirus tenuis (Leidy, 1889)
- Lepeophtheirus thompsoni Baird, 1850
- Lepeophtheirus tuberculatus I. H. Kim, 1993
- Lepeophtheirus uluus (A. G. Lewis, 1964)
- Lepeophtheirus unispinosus Pearse, 1952
- Lepeophtheirus watanabei Shiino, 1954
- Lepeophtheirus yanezi Stuardo & Fagetti, 1961
- Lepeophtheirus zbigniewi Castro-Romero & Baeza-Kuroki, 1981
