= Crustacean larva =

Immature stages of crustaceans

Larval and adult prawns

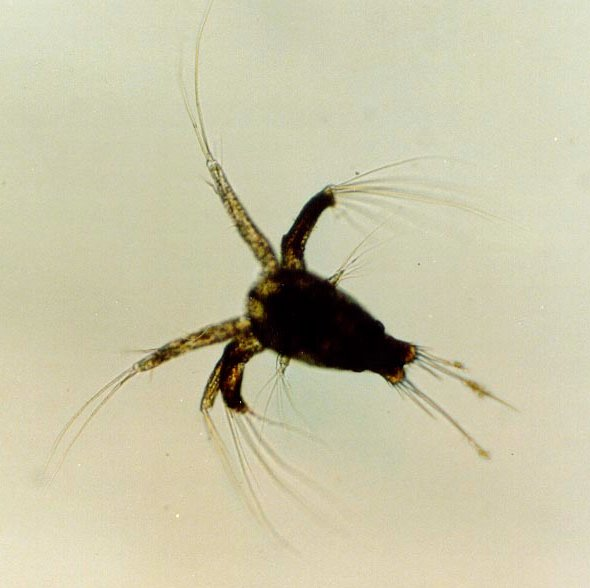
Nauplius larva

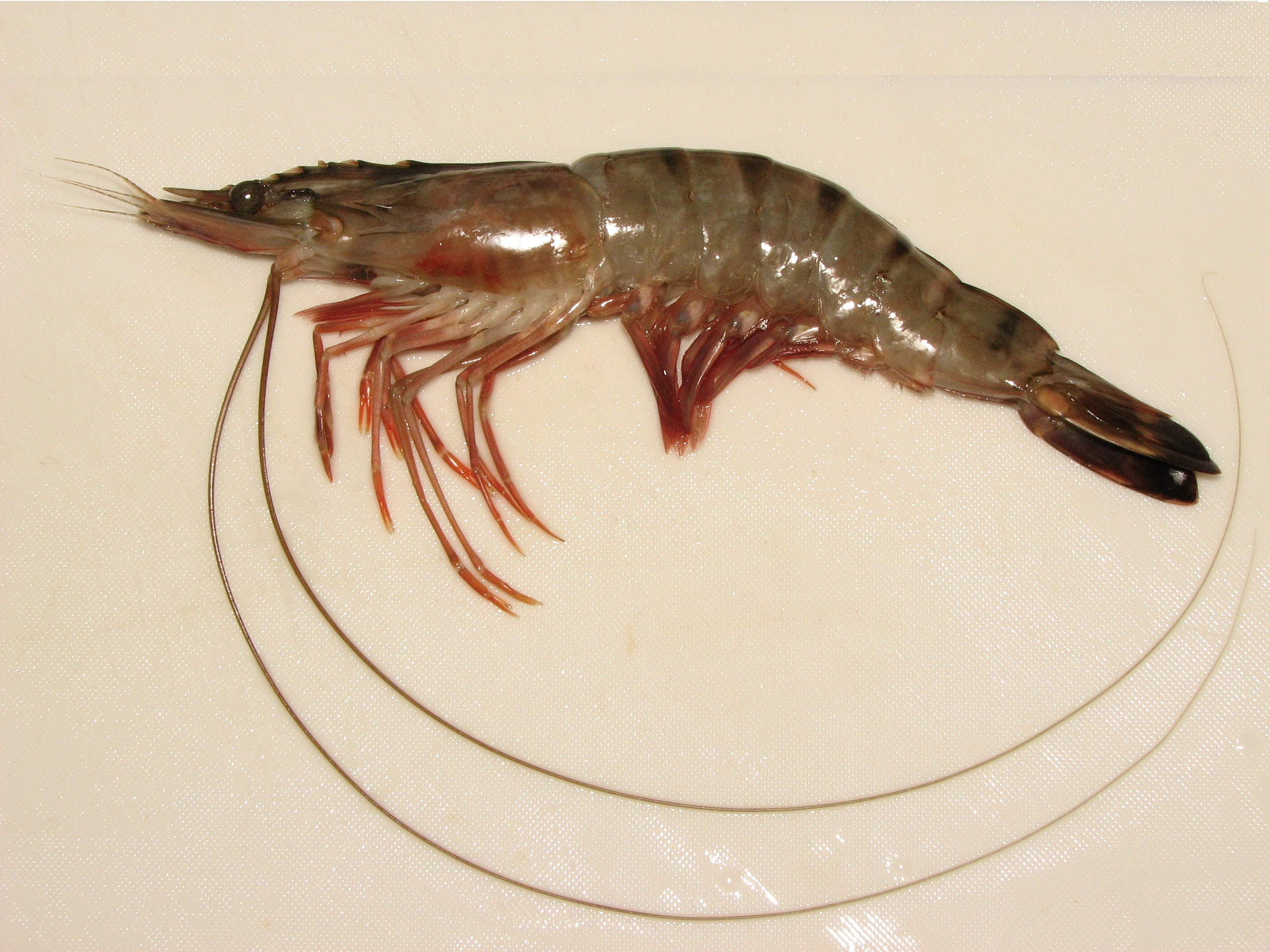
Adult Penaeus monodon

Crustaceans may pass through a number of larval and immature stages between hatching from their eggs and reaching their adult form. Each of the stages is separated by a moult, in which the hard exoskeleton is shed to allow the animal to grow. The larvae of crustaceans often bear little resemblance to the adult, and there are still cases where it is not known what larvae will grow into what adults. This is especially true of crustaceans which live as benthic adults (on the sea bed), more-so than where the larvae are planktonic, and thereby easily caught.

Many crustacean larvae were not immediately recognised as larvae when they were discovered, and were described as new genera and species. The names of these genera have become generalised to cover specific larval stages across wide groups of crustaceans, such as zoea and nauplius. Other terms described forms which are only found in particular groups, such as the glaucothoe of hermit crabs, or the phyllosoma of slipper lobsters and spiny lobsters.

== Life cycle ==
At its most complete, a crustacean's life cycle begins with an egg, which is usually fertilised, but may instead be produced by parthenogenesis. This egg hatches into a pre-larva or pre-zoea. Through a series of moults, the young animal then passes through various zoea stages, followed by a megalopa or post-larva. This is followed by metamorphosis into an immature form, which broadly resembles the adult, and after further moults, the adult form is finally reached. Some crustaceans continue to moult as adults, while for others, the development of gonads signals the final moult.

Any organs which are absent from the adults do not generally appear in the larvae, although there are a few exceptions, such as the vestige of the fourth pereiopod in the larvae of Lucifer, and some pleopods in certain Anomura and Brachyura. In a more extreme example, the Sacculina and other Rhizocephala have a distinctive nauplius larva with its complex body structure, but the adult form lacks many organs due to extreme adaptation to its parasitic life style.

Cyclops (Copepoda)

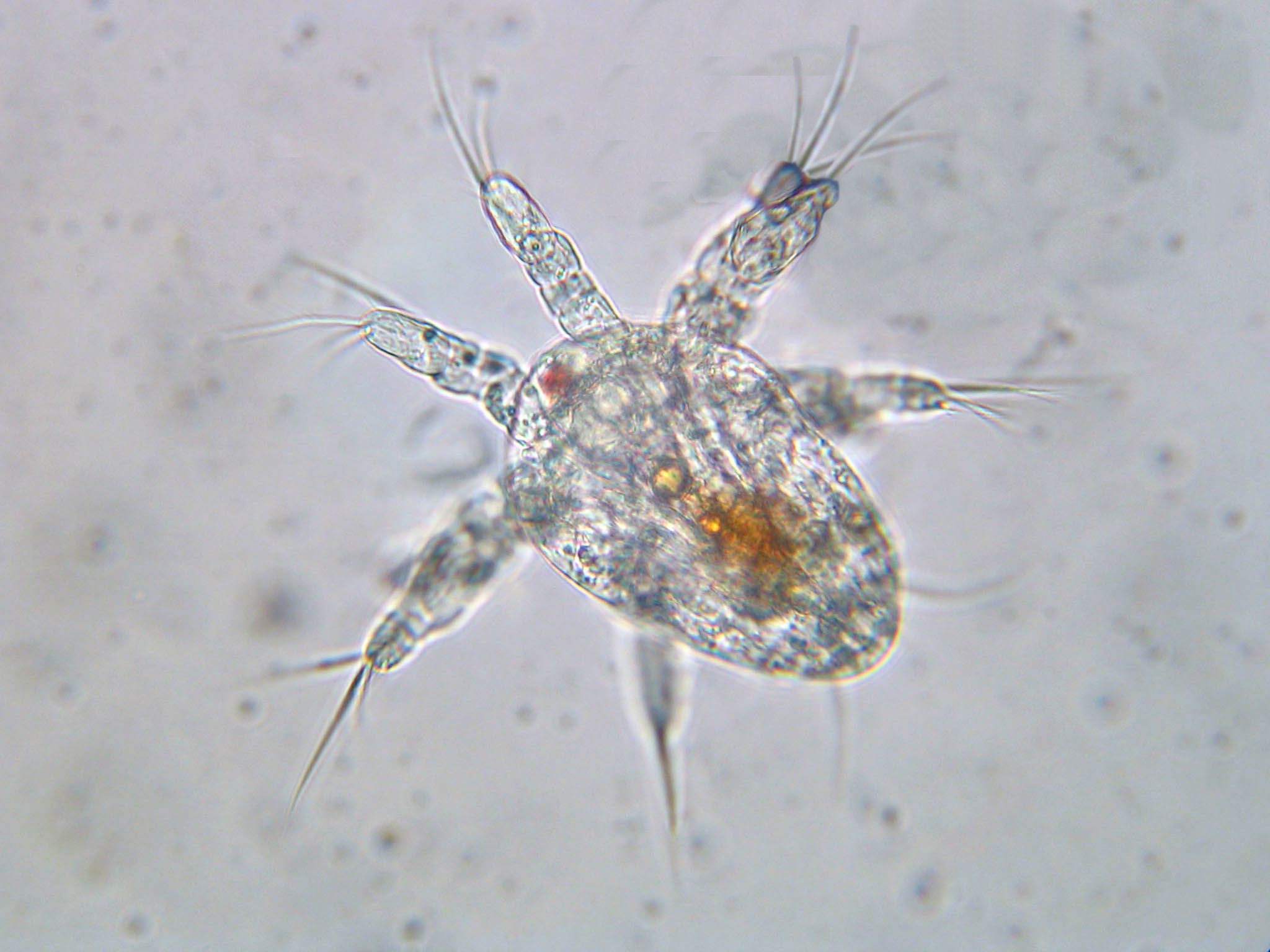
Nauplius

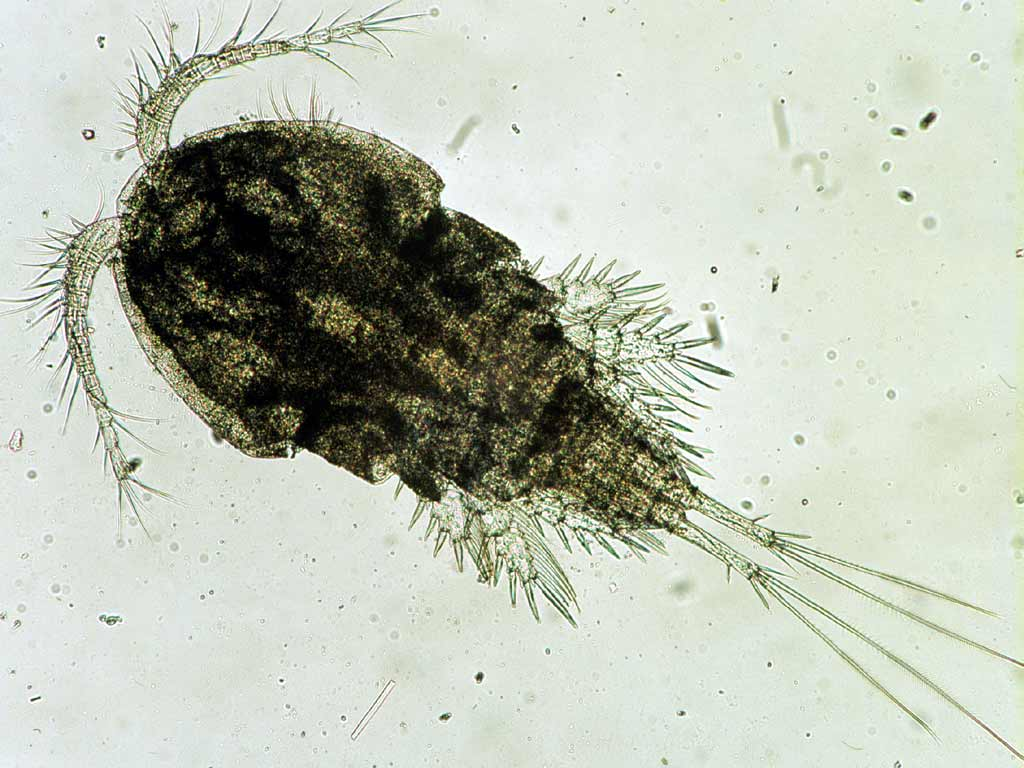
Adult

== History of the study of crustacean larva ==
Antonie van Leeuwenhoek was the first person to observe the difference between larval crustaceans and the adults when he watched the eggs of Cyclops hatching in 1699. Despite this, and other observations over the following decades, there was controversy among scientists about whether or not metamorphosis occurred in crustaceans, with conflicting observations presented, based on different species, some of which went through a metamorphosis, and some of which did not. In 1828 John Vaughan Thompson published a paper "On the Metamorphoses of the Crustacea, and on Zoea, exposing their singular structure and demonstrating they are not, as has been supposed, a peculiar Genus but the Larva of Crustacea!!". His work was not believed due to crayfish not undergoing metamorphosis. This controversy persisted for several more decades, as the first descriptions of a complete series of larval forms were not published until the 1870s (Sidney Irving Smith on the American lobster in 1873; Georg Ossian Sars on the European lobster in 1875, and Walter Faxon on the shrimp Palaemonetes vulgaris in 1879).

== Larval stages ==
Anatomy of nauplii

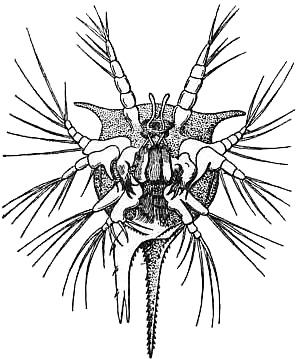
Ventral view of a Tetraclita nauplius, showing cephalic appendages

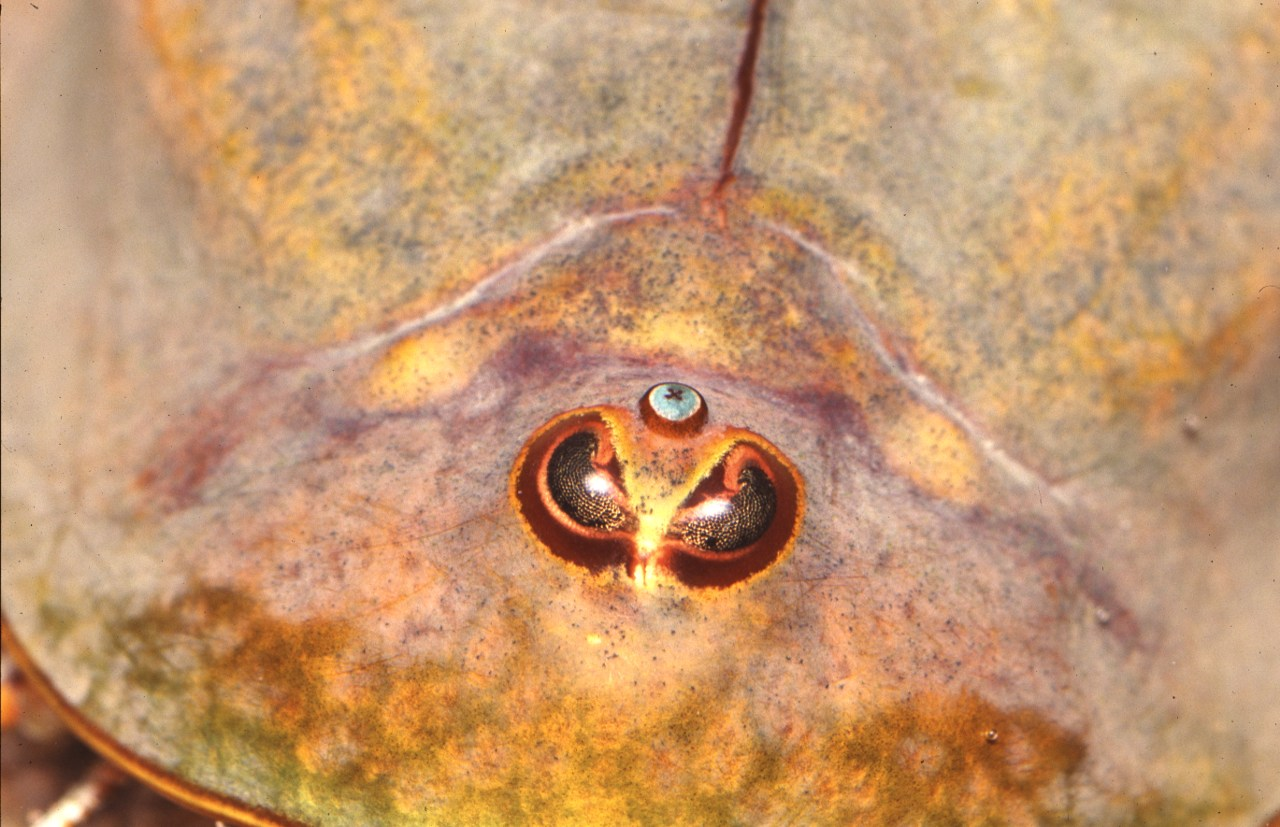
Close-up of an adult Triops (Notostraca), showing a persistent naupliar eye between the two compound eyes

=== Nauplius ===
The genus name Nauplius was published posthumously by Otto Friedrich Müller in 1785 for animals now known to be the larvae of copepods. The nauplius stage (plural: nauplii) is characterised by consisting of only three head segments, which are covered by a single carapace. The posterior body, when present, is unsegmented with bilobed anal region. Each head segment has a pair of unjointed, uniramous antennules; antennae and mandibles also in pairs in the trunk segment (latter two are biramous - branch into two). This larval stage has various lifestyles; some are benthic while others are swimmers, some are feeding while others are non-feeders (lecithotrophic). The nauplius is also the stage at which a simple, unpaired eye is present. The eye is known for that reason as the "naupliar eye", and is often absent in later developmental stages, although it is retained into the adult form in some groups, such as the Notostraca. Some crustacean groups lack this larval type, isopods being one example.

=== Metanauplius ===
Advanced stage of nauplius in some Decapoda. Trunk shows posterior segmentation. Rudiments of maxillae and first two maxillipedes appear (larva starts feeding). Carapace grows back from the dorsal plate of the head.

=== Cypris ===
In Ostracod and some Cirripedia, nauplius changes to a Cypris larva which is enclosed in a bivalved shell with an adductor muscle to close it.

=== Erichthus ===
Highly modified nauplius of some stomatopod with spiny carapace and large, raptorial second maxillipedes and poorly developed abdomen.

=== Protozoea ===
In Penaeus, metanauplius changes to a Protozoea larva. Carapace grows larger, seven pairs of appendages (five cephalic and two thoracic) already developed become functional; rudiments of compound eyes and remaining six pairs of thoracic appendages appear and a long, unsegmented, limbless abdomen forms.

=== Zoea ===
The genus Zoea was initially described by Louis Augustin Guillaume Bosc in 1802 for an animal now known to be the larva of a crab. The zoea stage (plural: zoeas or zoeae), only found in members of Malacostraca, is characterised by the use of the thoracic appendages for swimming and a large dorsal spine. Protozoea is followed by the zoea stage. Some Decapod, hatch directly at zoea stage. It has a large cephalothorax with an anterior rostrum, two prominent stalked compound eyes well developed cephalic and anterior thoracic (first two maxillipedes) appendages, rudimentary posterior thoracic appendages and long six segmented abdomen with a forked telson.

=== Metazoea ===
An advanced stage of zoea stage where three pairs of maxillipedes become well formed and rudiments of six pairs of abdominal appendages appear. Anomura hatch at zoea stage and pass through metazoea stage.

=== Alima ===
It is a highly modified zoea found in Squilla and hatches directly from the egg. It differs from zoea in having armed telson and large raptorial second maxillipedes.

=== Megalopa ===
In Crab, zoea or metazoea after successive moults changes to a Megalopa larva which has a broad, unsegmented cephalothorax with an anterior rostrum and large, stalked compound eyes. All the thoracic appendages are fully formed. Abdomen is long, straight and bears biramous pleopods. Megalopa first leads a pelagic life but later takes to creeping at the bottom. Its abdomen gradually gets reduced and finally flexed under the cephalothorax.

=== Mysis (Schizopod) ===
Zoea of Penaeus moults into Mysis larva instead of megalopa. It has biramous appendages on all the thoracic segments and a long abdomen with 5 pairs of pleopods and a pair of uropods. It metamorphoses to adult by losing exopodites of the last 5 pairs of thoracic appendages. Lobsters hatch at this stage.

=== Phyllosoma (Glass Crab) ===
It is a modified mysis with flat, leaf like transparent body. Abdomen is short and cephalothorax is large with very long eye stalks and biramous legs. Spiny Lobster hatches as a phyllosoma.

=== Post-larva ===
The post-larva or Megalopae, also found exclusively in the Malacostraca, is characterised by the use of abdominal appendages (pleopods) for propulsion. The post-larva is usually similar to the adult form, and many names have been erected for this stage in different groups. William Elford Leach erected the genus Megalopa in 1813 for a post-larval crab; a copepod post-larva is called a copepodite; a barnacle post-larva is called a cypris; a shrimp post-larva is called a parva; a hermit crab post-larva is called a glaucothoe; a spiny lobster / furry lobsters post-larva is called a puerulus and a slipper lobster post-larva is called a nisto.

== Larvae of crustacean groups ==
=== Branchiopoda ===
In the Branchiopoda, the offspring hatch as a nauplius or metanauplius larva.

=== Cephalocarida ===
In the Mediterranean horseshoe shrimp Lightiella magdalenina, the young experience 15 stages following the nauplius, termed metanaupliar stages, and two juvenile stages, with each of the first six stages adding two trunk segments, and the last four segments being added singly.

=== Remipedia ===
The larvae of remipedes are lecithotrophic, consuming egg yolk rather than using external food sources. This characteristic, which is shared with malacostracan groups such as the Decapoda and Euphausiacea (krill) has been used to suggest a link between Remipedia and Malacostraca.

=== Malacostraca ===
==== Peracarida ====
Amphipod hatchlings resemble the adults.

Young isopod crustaceans hatch directly into a manca stage, which is similar in appearance to the adult. The lack of a free-swimming larval form has led to high rates of endemism in isopods, but has also allowed them to colonise the land, in the form of the woodlice.

==== Stomatopoda ====
The larvae of many groups of mantis shrimp are poorly known. In the superfamily Lysiosquilloidea, the larvae hatch as antizoea larvae, with five pairs of thoracic appendages, and develop into erichthus larvae, where the pleopods appear. In the Squilloidea, a pseudozoea larva develops into an alima larva, while in Gonodactyloidea, a pseudozoea develops into an erichthus.

A single fossil stomatopod larva has been discovered, in the Upper Jurassic Solnhofen lithographic limestone.

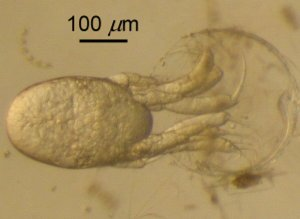
A nauplius of Euphausia pacifica hatching, emerging backwards from the egg

==== Krill ====
The life cycle of krill is relatively well understood, although there are minor variations in detail from species to species. After hatching, the larvae go through several stages called nauplius, pseudometanauplius, metanauplius, calyptopsis and furcilia stages, each of which is sub-divided into several sub-stages. The pseudometanauplius stage is exclusive to the so-called "sac-spawners". Until the metanauplius stage, the larvae are reliant on the yolk reserves, but from the calyptopsis stage, they begin to feed on phytoplankton. During the furcilia stages, segments with pairs of swimmerets are added, beginning at the frontmost segments, with each new pair only becoming functional at the next moult. After the final furcilia stage, the krill resembles the adult.

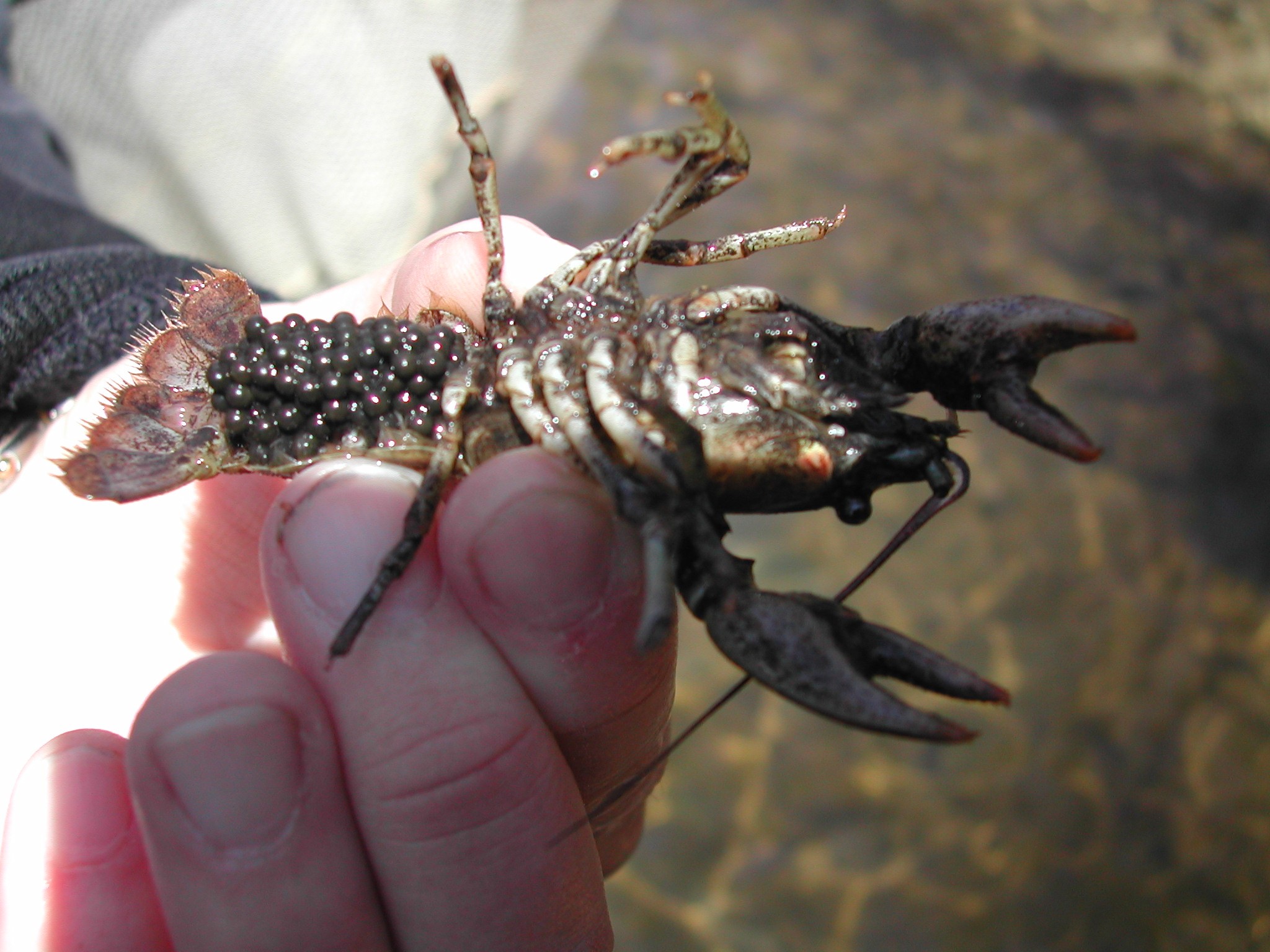
Eggs being brooded by a female Orconectes obscurus crayfish: such large eggs are often indicative of abbreviated development.

==== Decapoda ====
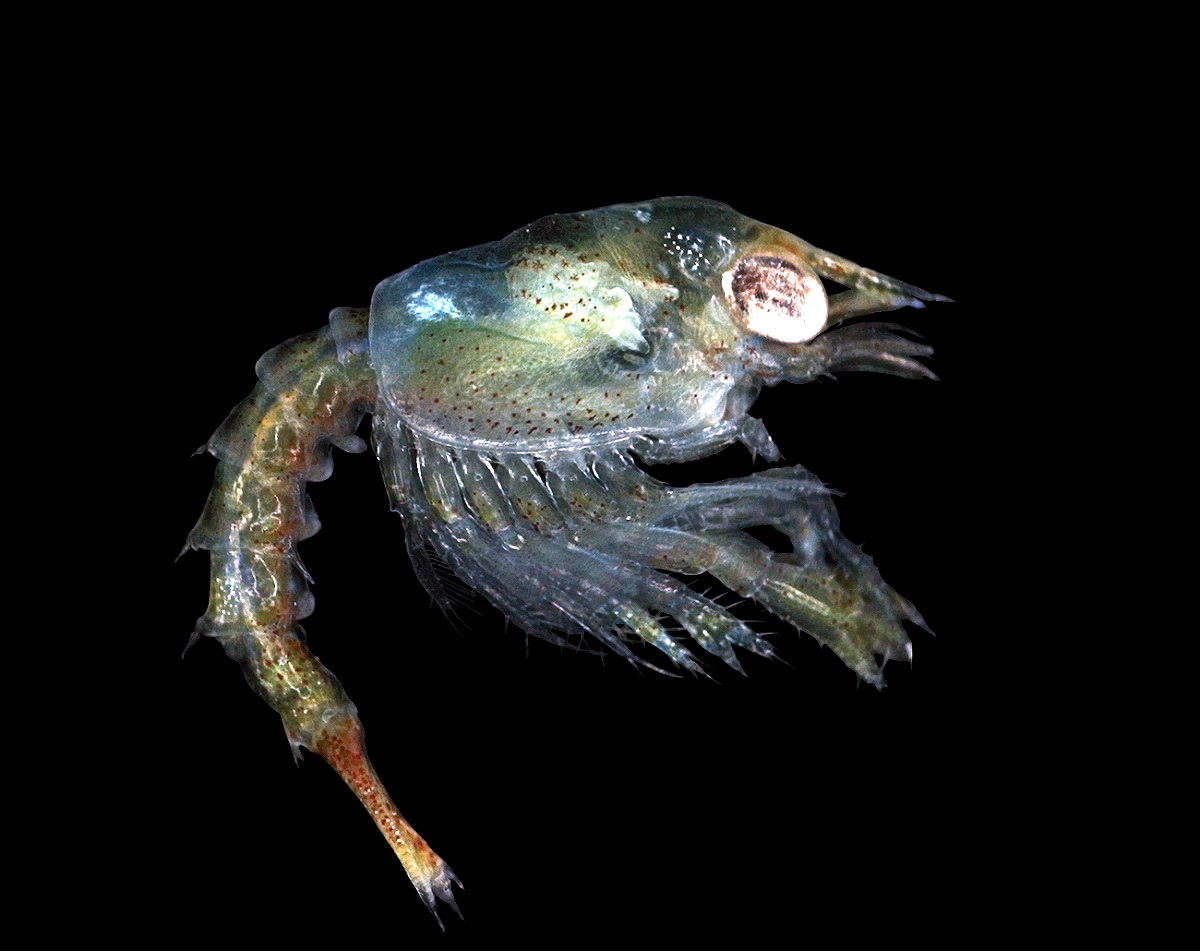
Zoea larva of a European lobster

Apart from the prawns of the suborder Dendrobranchiata, all decapod crustaceans brood their eggs on the female's pleopods. This has resulted in development in decapod crustaceans being generally abbreviated. There are at most nine larval stages in decapods, as in krill, and both decapod nauplii and krill nauplii often lack mouthparts and survive on nutrients supplied in the egg yolk (lecithotrophy). In species with normal development, eggs are roughly 1% of the size of the adult; in species with abbreviated development, and therefore more yolk in the eggs, the eggs may reach one-ninth of the adult's size.

The post-larva of shrimp is called parva, after the species Acanthephyra parva described by Henri Coutière, but which was later recognised as the larva of Acanthephyra purpurea.

In the marine lobsters, there are three larval stages, all similar in appearance.

Freshwater crayfish embryos differ from those of other crustaceans in having 40 ectoteloblast cells, rather than around 19. The larvae show abbreviated development, and hatch with a full complement of adult appendages with the exceptions of the uropods and the first pair of pleopods.

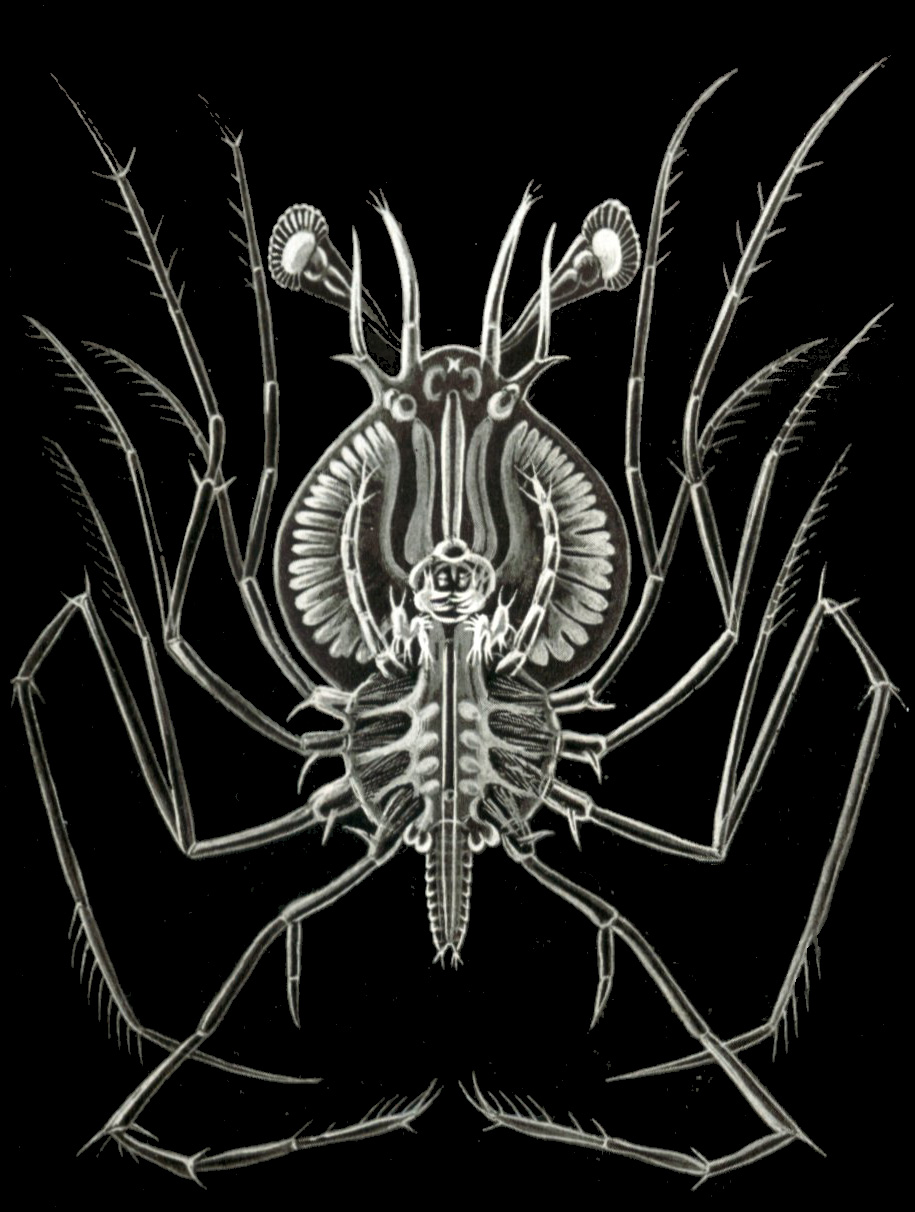
A phyllosoma larva of the spiny lobster Palinurus elephas, from Ernst Haeckel's Kunstformen der Natur

The larvae of the Achelata (slipper lobsters, spiny lobsters and furry lobsters) are unlike any other crustacean larvae. The larvae are known as phyllosoma, after the genus Phyllosoma erected by William Elford Leach in 1817. They are flattened and transparent, with long legs and eyes on long eyestalks. After passing through 8–10 phyllosoma stages, the larva undergoes "the most profound transformation at a single moult in the Decapoda", when it develops into the so-called puerulus stage, which is an immature form resembling the adult animal.

The members of the traditional infraorder Thalassinidea can be divided into two groups on the basis of their larvae. According to Robert Gurney, the "homarine group" comprises the families Axiidae and Callianassidae, while the "anomuran group" comprises the families Laomediidae and Upogebiidae. This split corresponds with the division later confirmed with molecular phylogenetics.

Among the Anomura, there is considerable variation in the number of larval stages. In the South American freshwater genus Aegla, the young hatch from the eggs in the adult form. Squat lobsters pass through four, or occasionally five, larval states, which have a long rostrum, and a spine on either side of the carapace; the first post-larva closely resembles the adult. Porcelain crabs have two or three larval stages, in which the rostrum and the posterior spine on the carapace are "enormously long". Hermit crabs pass through around four larval stages. The post-larva is known as the glaucothoe, after a genus named by Henri Milne-Edwards in 1830. The glaucothoe is 3 millimetres (0.12 in) long in Pagurus longicarpus, but glaucothoe larvae up to 20 mm (0.79 in) are known, and were once thought to represent animals which had failed to develop correctly. Like the preceding stages, the glaucothoe is symmetrical, and although the glaucothoe begins as a free-swimming form, it often acquires a gastropod shell to live in; the coconut crab, Birgus latro, always carries a shell when the immature animal comes ashore, but this is discarded later.

Carcinus maenas (Decapoda: Brachyura)

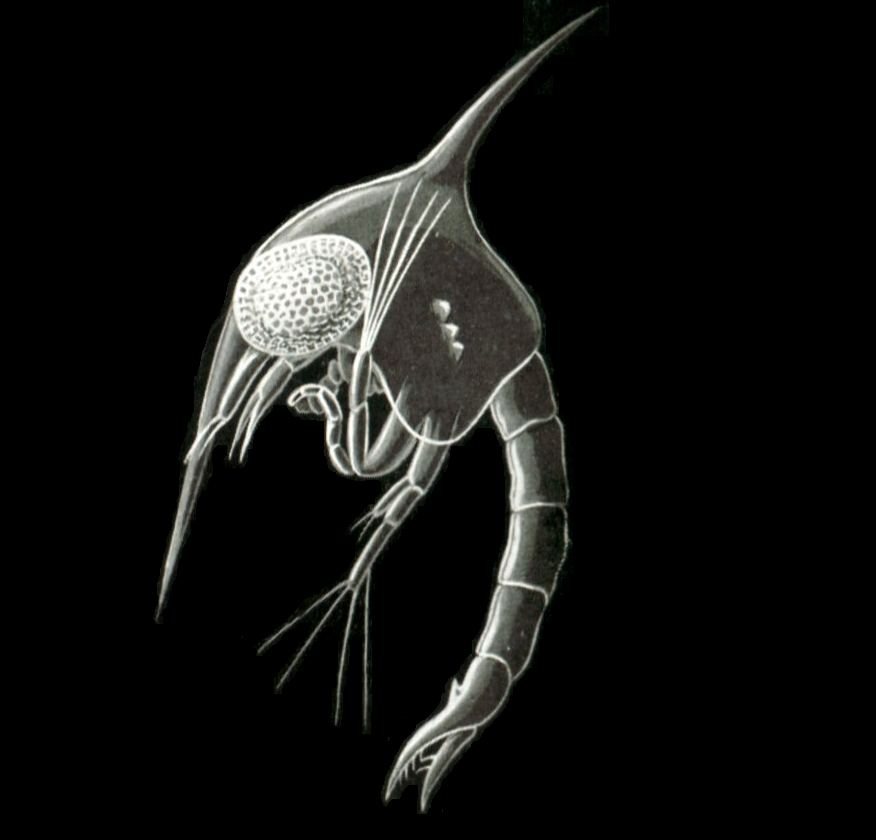
Zoea

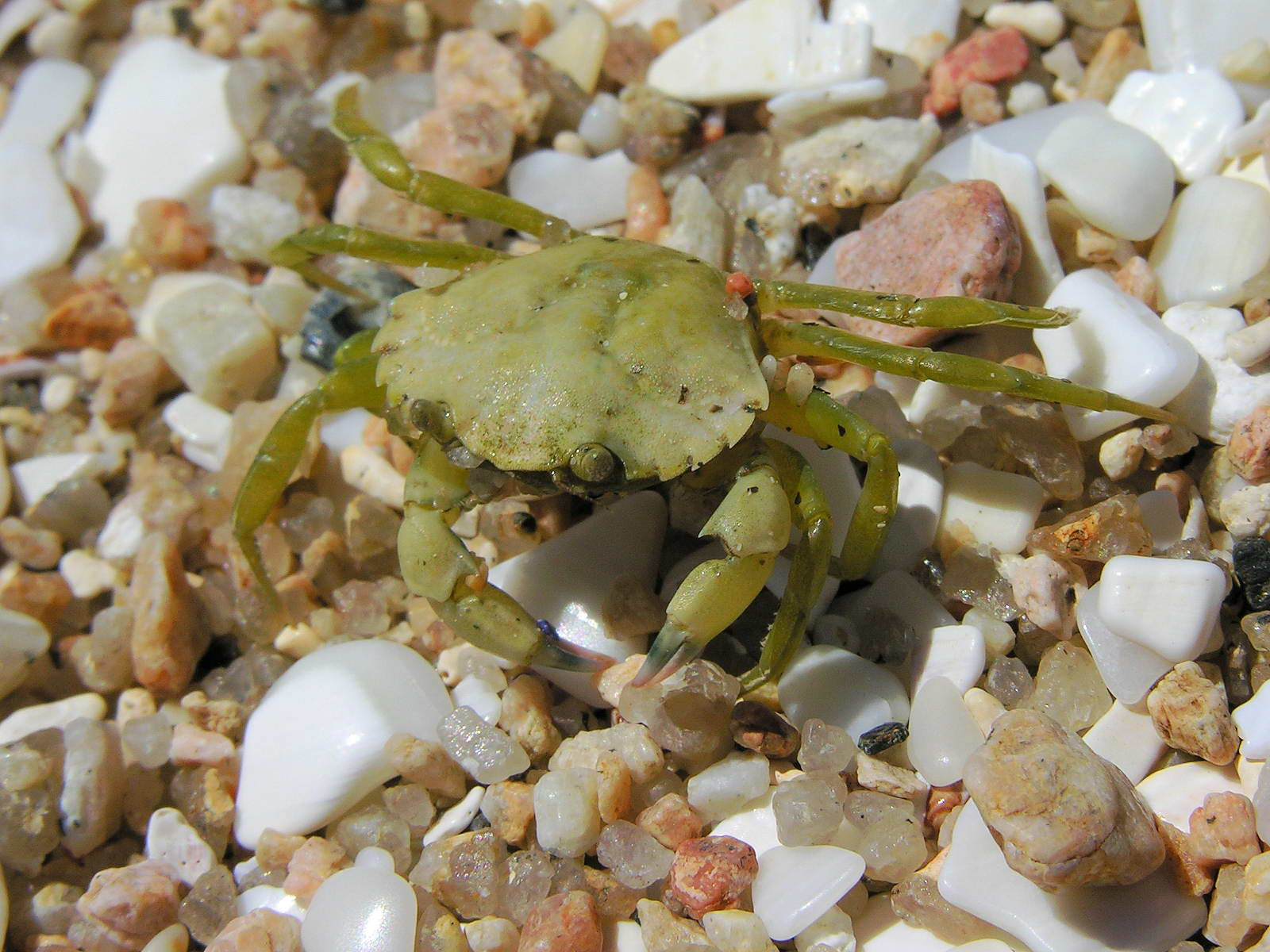
Juvenile

Although they are classified as members of Brachyura, the larvae of Dromiacea are similar to those of the Anomura, which led many scientists to place dromiacean crabs in the Anomura, rather than the Brachyura. Apart from the Dromiacea, all crabs share a similar and distinctive larval form. The crab zoea has a slender, curved abdomen and a forked telson, but its most striking features are the long rostral and dorsal spines, sometimes augmented by further, lateral spines. These spines can be many times longer than the body of the larva. Crab prezoea larvae have been found fossilised in the stomach contents of the Early Cretaceous bony fish Tharrhias.

=== Copepoda ===
Copepods have six naupliar stages, followed by a stage called the copepodid, which has the same number of body segments and appendages in all copepods. The copepodid larva has two pairs of unsegmented swimming appendages, and an unsegmented "hind-body" comprising the thorax and the abdomen. There are typically five copepodid stages, but parasitic copepods may stop after a single copepodid stage. Once the gonads develop, there are no further moults.

==== Parasitic copepods ====
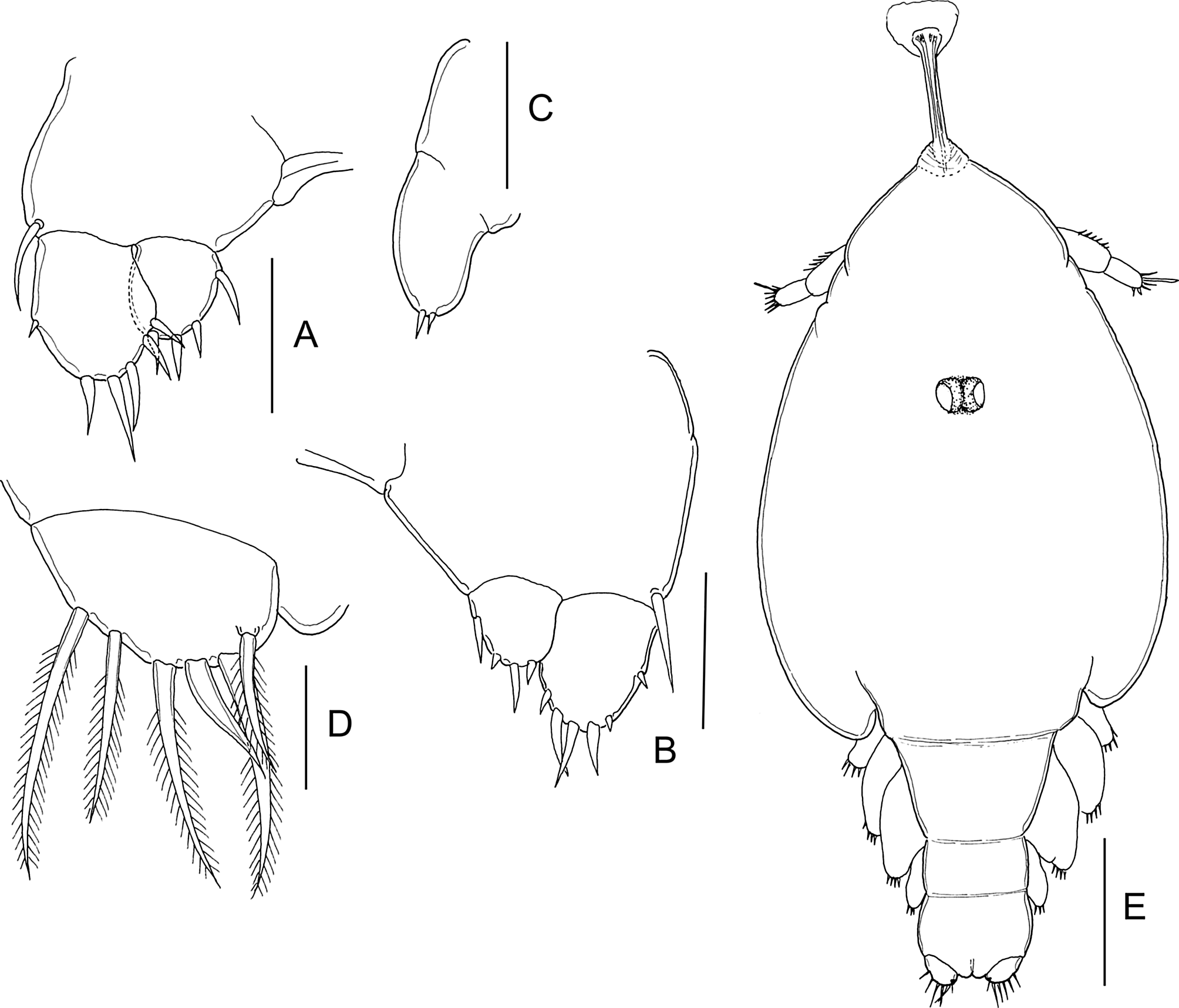
First chalimus of Lepeophtheirus elegans Gusev, 1951 (Copepoda, Caligidae): A, leg 3; B, leg 3 (other specimen); C, leg 4; D, caudal ramus; E, habitus of putative female, dorsal. Scale bars: A–D = 0.025 mm; E = 0.2 mm.

Chalimus (plural chalimi) is a stage of development of a copepod parasite of fish, such as the salmon louse (Lepeophtheirus salmonis).

Chalimus Burmeister, 1834 is also a synonym for Lepeophtheirus Nordmann, 1832.

=== Facetotecta ===
The single genus in the Facetotecta, Hansenocaris, is only known from its larvae. They were first described by Christian Andreas Victor Hensen in 1887, and named "y-nauplia" by Hans Jacob Hansen, assuming them to be the larvae of barnacles. The adults are presumed to be parasites of other animals.

== See also ==
- Ichthyoplankton
- Marine larval ecology
