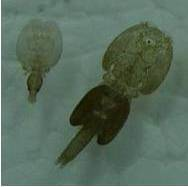
- Male and female Lepeophtheirus salmonis

Scientific classification
- Kingdom: Animalia
- Phylum: Arthropoda
- Clade: Pancrustacea
- Class: Copepoda
- Order: Siphonostomatoida
- Family: Caligidae; Burmeister, 1834

Genera
- Abasia C. B. Wilson, 1908; Alanlewisia Boxshall, 2008; Alebion Krøyer, 1863; Alicaligus Shiino, 1955; Anchicaligus Stebbing, 1900; Anuretes Heller, 1865; Arrama Dojiri & Cressey, 1991; Avitocaligus Boxshall & Justine, 2005; Belizia Cressey, 1990; Caligodes Heller, 1865; Caligus O. F. Müller, 1785; Calistes Dana, 1852; Caritus Cressey, 1967; Cresseyella Bezdek & Cressey, 2004; Dartevellia Brian, 1939; Diphyllogaster Brian, 1899; Echetus Kroyer, 1863; Euryphorus H. Milne-Edwards, 1840; Gloiopotes Steenstrup & Lütken, 1861; Hermilius Heller, 1865; Indocaligus Pillai, 1961; Kabataella Prabha & Pillai, 1983; Lepeophtheirus von Nordmann, 1832; Mappates Rangnekar, 1958; Markevichus Özdikmen, 2008; Paralebion C. B. Wilson, 1911; Parapetalus Steenstrup & Lütken, 1861; Parechetus Pillai, 1962; Pseudanuretes Yamaguti, 1936; Pseudechetus Prabha & Pillai, 1979; Pseudocaligus A. Scott, 1901; Pseudolepeophtheirus Markevich, 1940; Pupulina Beneden, 1892; Sciaenophilus Beneden, 1852; Synestius Steenstrup & Lütken, 1861; Tuxophorus C. B. Wilson, 1908

Synonyms
- Euryphoridae

= Sea louse =

Sea lice

Family of copepods

Sea lice (singular: sea louse) are copepods (small crustaceans) of the family Caligidae within the order Siphonostomatoida. They are marine ectoparasites (external parasites) that feed on the mucus, epidermal tissue, and blood of host fish. The roughly 559 species in 37 genera include around 162 Lepeophtheirus and 268 Caligus species.

The genera Lepeophtheirus and Caligus parasitize marine fish. Lepeophtheirus salmonis and various Caligus species are adapted to salt water and are major ectoparasites of farmed and wild Atlantic salmon. Several antiparasitic drugs have been developed for control purposes. L. salmonis is the best understood in the areas of its biology and interactions with its salmon host.

Caligus rogercresseyi has become a major parasite of concern on salmon farms in countries including Chile and Scotland. Studies are under way to gain a better understanding of the parasite and the host-parasite interactions. Recent evidence is also emerging that L. salmonis in the Atlantic has sufficient genetic differences from L. salmonis from the Pacific to suggest that Atlantic and Pacific L. salmonis may have independently co-evolved with Atlantic and Pacific salmonids respectively.

== Diversity ==
The family Caligidae is estimated to contain around 559 species in 37 genera. The largest of these are Caligus, with around 268 species, and Lepeophtheirus with around 162 species.

== Wild fish ==
Most understanding of the biology of sea lice, other than the early morphological studies, is based on laboratory studies designed to understand issues associated with sea lice infecting fish on salmon farms. Information on sea lice biology and interactions with wild fish is sparse in most areas with a long-term history of open net-cage development, since understanding background levels of sea lice and transfer mechanisms has rarely been a condition of tenure license for farm operators.

Many sea louse species are specific with regard to host genera, for example L. salmonis, which has high specificity for anadromous fish including sticklebacks and salmonids including the widely farmed Atlantic salmon (Salmo salar). Lepeophtheirus salmonis can parasitize other salmonids to varying degrees, including brown trout (sea trout: Salmo trutta), Arctic char (Salvelinus alpinus), and all species of Pacific salmon. In the case of Pacific salmon, coho, chum, and pink salmon (Oncorhynchus kisutch, O. keta, and O. gorbuscha, respectively) mount strong tissue responses to attaching L. salmonis, which lead to rejection within the first week of infection. Pacific L. salmonis can also develop, but not complete, its full lifecycle on the three-spined stickleback (Gasterosteus aculeatus). This has not been observed with Atlantic L. salmonis.

How planktonic stages of sea lice disperse and find new hosts is still not completely known. Temperature, light, and currents are major factors and survival depends on salinity above 25 ‰. L. salmonis copepodids migrating upwards towards light and salmon smolt moving downwards at daybreak have been hypothesized to facilitate finding a host. Several field and modeling studies on L. salmonis have examined copepodid populations and have shown that planktonic stages can be transported tens of kilometres from their source, including how their behaviour results in their being moved towards the coastline and mouth of estuaries.

The source of L. salmonis infections when salmon return from fresh water has always been a mystery. Sea lice die and fall off anadromous fish such as salmonids when they return to fresh water. Atlantic salmon return and travel upstream in the fall to reproduce, while the smolts do not return to salt water until the next spring. Pacific salmon return to the marine nearshore starting in June, and finish as late as December, dependent upon species and run timing, whereas the smolts typically outmigrate starting in April, and ending in late August, dependent upon species and run timing.

Sea lice possibly survive on fish that remain in the estuaries or they transfer to an as yet unknown alternate host to spend the winter. Smolt get infected with sea lice larvae, or even possibly adults, when they enter the estuaries in the spring. How sea lice distribute between fish in the wild also is not known. Adult stages of Lepeophtheirus spp. can transfer under laboratory conditions, but the frequency is low. Caligus spp. transfer quite readily and between different species of fish, and are regularly found in the plankton.

== Morphology ==
L. salmonis tends to be about twice the size of most Caligus spp. (e.g. C. elongatus, C. clemensi, etc.). The body consists of four regions: cephalothorax, fourth (leg-bearing) segment, genital complex, and abdomen. The cephalothorax forms a broad shield that includes all of the body segments up to the third leg-bearing segment. It acts like a suction cup in holding the louse on the fish. All species have mouth parts shaped as a siphon or oral cone (characteristic of the Siphonostomatoida). The second antennae and oral appendages are modified to assist in holding the parasite on the fish. The second pair of antennae is also used by males to grasp the female during copulation. The adult females are always significantly larger than males and develop a very large genital complex, which in many species makes up the majority of the body mass. Two egg strings of 500 to 1000 eggs (L. salmonis), which darken with maturation, are roughly the same length as the female's body. One female can produce 6–11 pairs of egg strings in a lifetime around seven months.

== Development ==
Sea lice have both free-swimming (planktonic) and parasitic life stages, all separated by moults. The development rate for L. salmonis from egg to adult varies from 17 to 72 days depending on temperature. The lifecycle of L. salmonis is shown in the figure; the sketches of the stages are from Schram.

Eggs hatch into nauplii I, which moult to a second naupliar stage; neither naupliar stage feeds, depending on yolk reserves for energy, and both are adapted for swimming. The copepodid stage is the infectious stage and it searches for an appropriate host, likely by chemo- and mechanosensory clues. Currents, salinity, light, and other factors also assist copepodids in finding a host. Preferred settlement on the fish occurs in areas with the least hydrodynamic disturbance, particularly the fins and other protected areas. Once attached to a suitable host, copepods feed for a period of time prior to moulting to the chalimus I stage. Sea lice continue their development through three additional chalimus stages each separated by a moult. A characteristic feature of all four chalimus stages is that they are physically attached to the host by a structure referred to as the frontal filament. Differences in the timing, method of production, and the physical structure of the frontal filament are seen between different species of sea lice. With exception of a short period during the moult, the preadult and adult stages are mobile on the fish, and in some cases, can move between host fish. Adult females, being larger, occupy relatively flat body surfaces on the posterior ventral and dorsal midlines and may actually outcompete preadults and males at these sites.

== Feeding habits ==
Until they locate a host, the naupliar and copepodid stages are non-feeding and live on endogenous food stores. Once attached to the host, the copepodid stage begins feeding and begins to develop into the first chalimus stage. Copepods and chalimus stages have a developed gastrointestinal tract and feed on host mucus and tissues within range of their attachment. Pre-adult and adult sea lice, especially pregnant females, are aggressive feeders, in some cases feeding on blood in addition to tissue and mucus. Blood is often seen in the digestive tract, especially of adult females. L. salmonis is known to secrete large amounts of trypsin into its host's mucus, which may assist in feeding and digestion. Other compounds such as, prostaglandin E2, have also been identified in L. salmonis secretions and may assist in feeding and/or serve the parasite in avoiding the immune response of the host by regulating it at the feeding site. Whether sea lice are vectors of disease is unknown, but they can be carriers of bacteria and viruses likely obtained from their attachment to and feeding on tissues of contaminated fish.

== Disease ==
=== Pathology ===
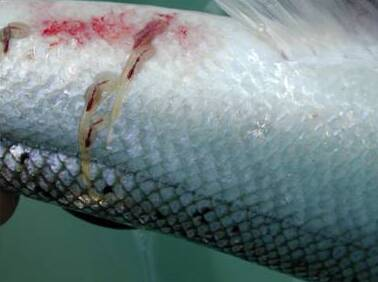
Pregnant female Lepeophtheirus salmonis on Atlantic salmon, Salmo salar

Sea lice cause physical and enzymatic damage at their sites of attachment and feeding, which results in abrasion-like lesions that vary in their nature and severity depending upon a number of factors, including host species, age, and general health of the fish. Whether stressed fish are particularly prone to infestation is unclear. Sea-lice infection causes a generalized chronic stress response in fish since feeding and attachment cause changes in the mucus consistency and damage the epithelium resulting in loss of blood and fluids, electrolyte changes, and cortisol release. This can decrease salmon immune responses and make them susceptible to other diseases and reduce growth and performance.

The degree of damage is also dependent on the species of sea lice, the developmental stages that are present, and the number of sea lice on a fish. Little evidence exists of host tissue responses in Atlantic salmon at the sites of feeding and attachment, regardless of the development stage. In contrast, coho and pink salmon show strong tissue responses to L. salmonis characterized by epithelial hyperplasia and inflammation. This results in rejection of the parasite within the first week of infection in these species of salmonids. Heavy infections of farmed Atlantic salmon and wild sockeye salmon (Oncorhynchus nerka) by L. salmonis can lead to deep lesions, particularly on the head region, even exposing the skull.

=== Interactions between wild and farmed fish ===
Some evidence indicates that sea lice flourishing on salmon farms can spread to nearby wild juvenile salmon and devastate these populations. Sea lice, particularly L. salmonis and various Caligus species, including C. clemensi and C. rogercresseyi, can cause deadly infestations of both farm-grown and wild salmon. Sea lice migrate and latch onto the skin of wild salmon during free-swimming, planktonic nauplii and copepodid larval stages, which can persist for several days. Large numbers of highly populated, open-net salmon farms can create exceptionally large concentrations of sea lice. When exposed in river estuaries containing large numbers of open-net farms, mathematical models have suggested that many young wild salmon may be infected Adult salmon may survive otherwise critical numbers of sea lice, but small, thin-skinned juvenile salmon migrating to sea are highly vulnerable. Sea trout populations in recent years may have seriously declined due to infestation by sea lice, and Krkosek et al. have claimed that on the Pacific coast of Canada the louse-induced mortality of pink salmon in some regions is over 80%. A few studies indicated no long-term damage to fish stocks in some locations, and a population decline in wild salmon that occurred in 2002 was caused by "something other than sea lice". However, the repeated epizootics of lice on wild fish have only occurred in areas with salmon farms in Ireland, Britain (Scotland), Norway, Canada (British Columbia), and Chile. Field sampling of copepodids, and hydrographic and population models, show how L. salmonis from farms can cause mass infestations of seaward-migrating salmonids, and this effect can occur up to 30 km (19 mi) from the farms.

Several scientific studies have suggested that caged, farmed salmon harbour lice to a degree that can destroy surrounding wild salmon populations. Other studies have shown that lice from farmed fish have relatively no effect on wild fish if good husbandry and adequate control measures are carried out (see section: Control on salmon farms). Further studies to establish wild-farmed fish interactions are ongoing, particularly in Canada, Britain (Scotland), Ireland, and Norway. A reference manual with protocol and guidelines for studying wild/cultured fish interactions with sea lice has been published.

== Fish farming ==
=== Control on salmon farms ===
This has been reviewed by Pike & Wadsworth, McVicar, and Costello. Integrated pest management programs for sea lice are instituted or recommended in a number of countries, including Canada, Norway, Scotland, and Ireland. Identification of epidemiological factors as potential risk factors for sea lice abundance with effective sea lice monitoring programs have been shown to effectively reduce sea lice levels on salmon farms.

==== Natural predators ====
Cleaner fish, including five species of wrasse (Labridae), are used on fish farms in Norway and to a lesser extent in Scotland, Shetland and Ireland. Their potential has not been researched in other fish farming regions, such as Pacific and Atlantic Canada or Chile.

==== Husbandry ====
Good husbandry techniques include fallowing, removal of dead and sick fish, prevention of net fouling, etc. Bay management plans are in place in most fish farming regions to keep sea lice below a level that could lead to health concerns on the farm or affect wild fish in surrounding waters. These include separation of year classes, counting and recording of sea lice on a prescribed basis, use of parasiticides when sea lice counts increase, and monitoring for resistance to parasiticides.

==== Salmon breeding ====
Early findings suggested genetic variation in the susceptibility of Atlantic salmon to Caligus elongatus. Research then began to identify trait markers, and recent studies have shown that susceptibility of Atlantic salmon to L. salmonis can be identified to specific families and that there is a link between MHC Class II and susceptibility to lice.

In October 2012, the grocery chain Sobeys pulled whole Atlantic salmon from 84 store locations in the Canadian Maritimes after concerns were raised over sea lice.

In 2017, salmon prices in Norway increased by 15% over a 3-month period because of a sea lice outbreak.

== Treatments ==
=== Freshwater ===
Freshwater is sometimes adequate to kill the sea lice and as salmon eventually swim in fresh water, they are not harmed.

=== Drugs and vaccines ===
The range of therapeutants for farmed fish was limited, often due to regulatory processing limitations. All drugs used have been assessed for environmental impact and risks. The parasiticides are classified into bath and in-feed treatments as follows:

==== Bath treatments ====
There are both advantages and disadvantages to using bath treatments. Bath treatments are more difficult and need more manpower to administer, requiring skirts or tarpaulins to be placed around the cages to contain the drug. Prevention of reinfection is a challenge since it is practically impossible to treat an entire bay in a short time period. Since the volume of water is imprecise, the required concentration is not guaranteed. Crowding of fish to reduce the volume of drug can also stress the fish. Recent use of well-boats containing the drugs has reduced both the concentration and environmental concerns, although transferring fish to the well boat and back to the cage can be stressful. The major advantage to bath treatments is that all the fish will be treated equally, in contrast to in-feed treatments where amount of drug ingested can vary due to a number of reasons.

==== Organophosphates ====
Organophosphates are acetylcholinesterase inhibitors and cause excitatory paralysis leading to death of sea lice when given as a bath treatment. Dichlorvos was used for many years in Europe and later replaced by azamethiphos, the active ingredient in Salmosan, which is safer for operators to handle. Azamethiphos is water-soluble and broken down relatively quickly in the environment. Resistance to organophosphates began to develop in Norway in the mid 1990s, apparently due to acetylcholinesterases being altered due to mutation. Use has declined considerably with the introduction of SLICE, emamectin benzoate.

==== Pyrethroids ====
Pyrethroids are direct stimulators of sodium channels in neuronal cells, inducing rapid depolarization and spastic paralysis leading to death. The effect is specific to the parasite since the drugs used are only slowly absorbed by the host and rapidly metabolized once absorbed. Cypermethrin (Excis, Betamax) and deltamethrin (Alphamax) are the two pyrethroids commonly used to control sea lice. Resistance to pyrethroids has been reported in Norway and appears to be due to a mutation leading to a structural change in the sodium channel which prevents pyrethroids from activating the channel. Use of deltamethrin has been increasing as an alternate treatment with the rise in resistance observed with emamectin benzoate.

==== Topical disinfectants ====
Bathing fish with hydrogen peroxide (350–500 mg/L for 20 min) will remove mobile sea lice from fish. It is environmentally friendly since H_{2}O_{2} dissociates to water and oxygen, but can be toxic to fish, depending on water temperature, as well as to operators. It appears to knock the sea lice off the fish, leaving them capable of reattaching to other fish and reinitiating an infection.

=== In-feed treatments ===
In-feed treatments are easier to administer and pose less environmental risk than bath treatments. Feed is usually coated with the drug and drug distribution to the parasite is dependent on the pharmacokinetics of the drug getting in sufficient quantity to the parasite. The drugs have high selective toxicity for the parasite, are quite lipid-soluble so that there is sufficient drug to act for approximately 2 months, and any unmetabolized drug is excreted so slowly that there are little to no environmental concerns.

==== Avermectins ====
Avermectins belong to the family of macrocyclic lactones and are the major drugs used as in-feed treatments to kill sea lice. The first avermectin used was ivermectin at doses close to the therapeutic level and was not submitted for legal approval for use on fish by its manufacturer. Ivermectin was toxic to some fish, causing sedation and central nervous system depression due to the drug's ability to cross the blood–brain barrier. Emamectin benzoate, which is the active agent in the formulation SLICE, has been used since 1999 and has a greater safety margin on fish. It is administered at 50 μg/kg/day for 7 days and is effective for two months, killing both chalimus and mobile stages. Withdrawal times vary with jurisdiction from 68 days in Canada to 175 degree days in Norway. Avermectins act by opening glutamate-gated chloride channels in arthropod neuromuscular tissues, causing hyperpolarization and flaccid paralysis leading to death. Resistance has been noted in Chalimus rogercresseyi in Chile and L. salmonis on North Atlantic fish farms. The resistance is likely due to prolonged use of the drug leading to up-regulation of P-glycoprotein, similar to what has been seen in nematode resistance to macrocyclic lactones.

==== Growth regulators ====
Teflubenzuron, the active agent in the formulation Calicide, is a chitin synthesis inhibitor and prevents moulting. It thus prevents further development of larval stages of sea lice, but has no effect on adults. It has been used only sparingly in sea lice control, largely due to concerns that it may affect the moult cycle of non-target crustaceans, although this has not been shown at the concentrations recommended.

=== Vaccines ===
A number of studies are underway to examine various antigens, particularly from the gastrointestinal tract and reproductive endocrine pathways, as vaccine targets, but no vaccine against sea lice has been reported to date. Two published studies have tested vaccine candidate antigens against salmon lice, which resulted in a reduced infection rate.

=== Optical methods ===
A more recent advance in the delousing strategy is to use pulsed lasers operating at the wavelength of 550 nm to delouse.

== See also ==
- Aquaculture of salmon
- Fish diseases and parasites
- Salmon louse
- Branchiurans, family Argulidae, order Arguloida are known as fish lice and parasitize fish in freshwater.
