= Andrew Rambaut =

British evolutionary biologist

Andrew Rambaut FRS FRSE
- Education: University of Edinburgh (BSc); University of Oxford (DPhil)
- Awards: Royal Society University Research Fellowship
- Scientific career
- Fields: Molecular evolution Virology; Molecular epidemiology Computational biology
- Workplaces: University of Edinburgh
- Thesis: The inference of evolutionary and population dynamic processes from molecular phylogenies (1997)
- Doctoral advisor: Paul H. Harvey
- Website: tree.bio.ed.ac.uk/people/arambaut/

Andrew Rambaut is a British evolutionary biologist and professor of molecular evolution at the University of Edinburgh.

== Education ==
Rambaut earned a Bachelor of Science degree in Zoology from the University of Edinburgh in 1993 followed by a DPhil in Zoology from the University of Oxford in 1997 supervised by Paul H. Harvey.

== Career and research ==
Rambaut was based at Oxford until 2006, when he took up a Royal Society University Research Fellowship position and became Chair of Molecular Evolution at Edinburgh in 2010. His research is primarily on the "evolutionary and epidemiological study of viral pathogens of humans and animals".

In 2007, Rambaut published a paper with Alexei Drummond describing BEAST (Bayesian evolutionary analysis sampling trees), a software package for evolutionary analysis by molecular sequence variation, which uses Bayesian inference techniques; this is freely available on GitHub. A year later, Rambaut set up Virological.org, an online "discussion forum for molecular evolution and epidemiology of viruses".

Rambaut has used genome sequencing to track the spread of monkeypox. His research suggests that cases outside Africa are all related and that the virus responsible may have been circulating in people since 2017.

=== COVID-19 ===
Science reported on 11 January 2020 that Rambaut was the first to publish the genome of the COVID-19 coronavirus after it was sent to him by Edward C. Holmes. Holmes has said that it "took 52 minutes from receiving the code [from his Chinese colleague Professor Yong-Zhen Zhang] to publishing" on Virological. The BBC Horizon episode The Vaccine stated: "When Chinese scientists published the genetic sequence of a mystery new virus on January 10th 2020, vaccine scientists around the world immediately sprang into action."

Rambaut was one of the authors of the scientific paper The proximal origin of SARS-CoV-2, which concluded that "SARS-CoV-2 is not a laboratory construct or a purposefully manipulated virus". The paper led to scientific and political allegations in 2023, when Republican politicians in the US made accusations that the paper was a cover-up to eliminate the lab leak theory. The paper and the controversy became known as the Proximal Origin.

Rambaut was an attendee of the UK government's Scientific Advisory Group for Emergencies (SAGE).

=== Awards and honours ===
Rambaut was elected a Fellow of the Royal Society (FRS) in 2022, having been a Fellow of the Royal Society of Edinburgh (FRSE) since 2014.

Rambaut was awarded the 2025 Darwin Medal by the Royal Society.
