= List of diseases and parasites in cod =

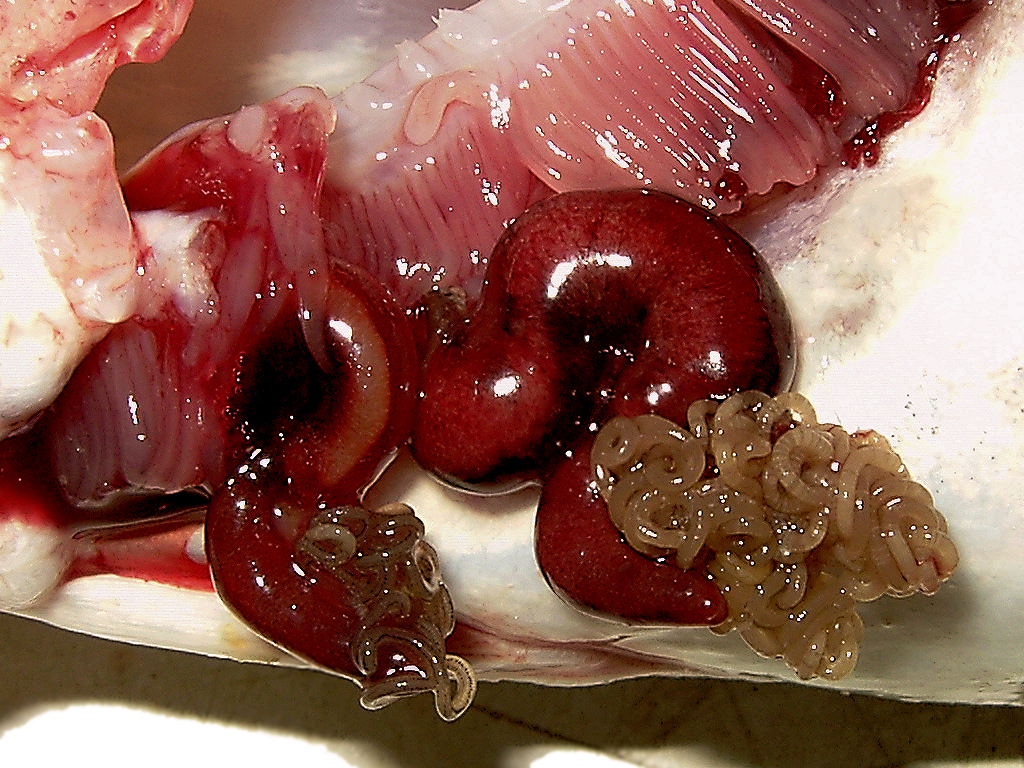
A fish with its gills infested with two cod worms

Cod and related species in the family Gadidae are susceptible to a variety of diseases and parasites.

== Laenaeocera branchialis ==
Lernaeocera branchialis, the "cod worm", is a copepod that infects gadoids. The first host used by cod worm is a flatfish or lumpsucker, which it captures with grasping hooks at the front of its body. It penetrates the lumpsucker with a thin filament, which it uses to suck the host's blood. The nourished cod worm then mates with another one on the lumpsucker. The female worm, with her now-fertilized eggs, then finds a cod, or a cod-like fish, such as a haddock or whiting. There, the worm clings to the gills while it metamorphoses into a plump, sinusoidal, worm-like body, with a coiled mass of egg strings at the rear. The front part of the worm's body penetrates the body of the cod until it enters the rear bulb of the host's heart. There, firmly rooted in the cod's circulatory system, the front part of the parasite develops like the branches of a tree, reaching into the main artery. In this way, the worm extracts nutrients from the cod's blood, remaining safely tucked beneath the cod's gill cover until it releases a new generation of offspring into the water.

== Parasites of Atlantic cod ==
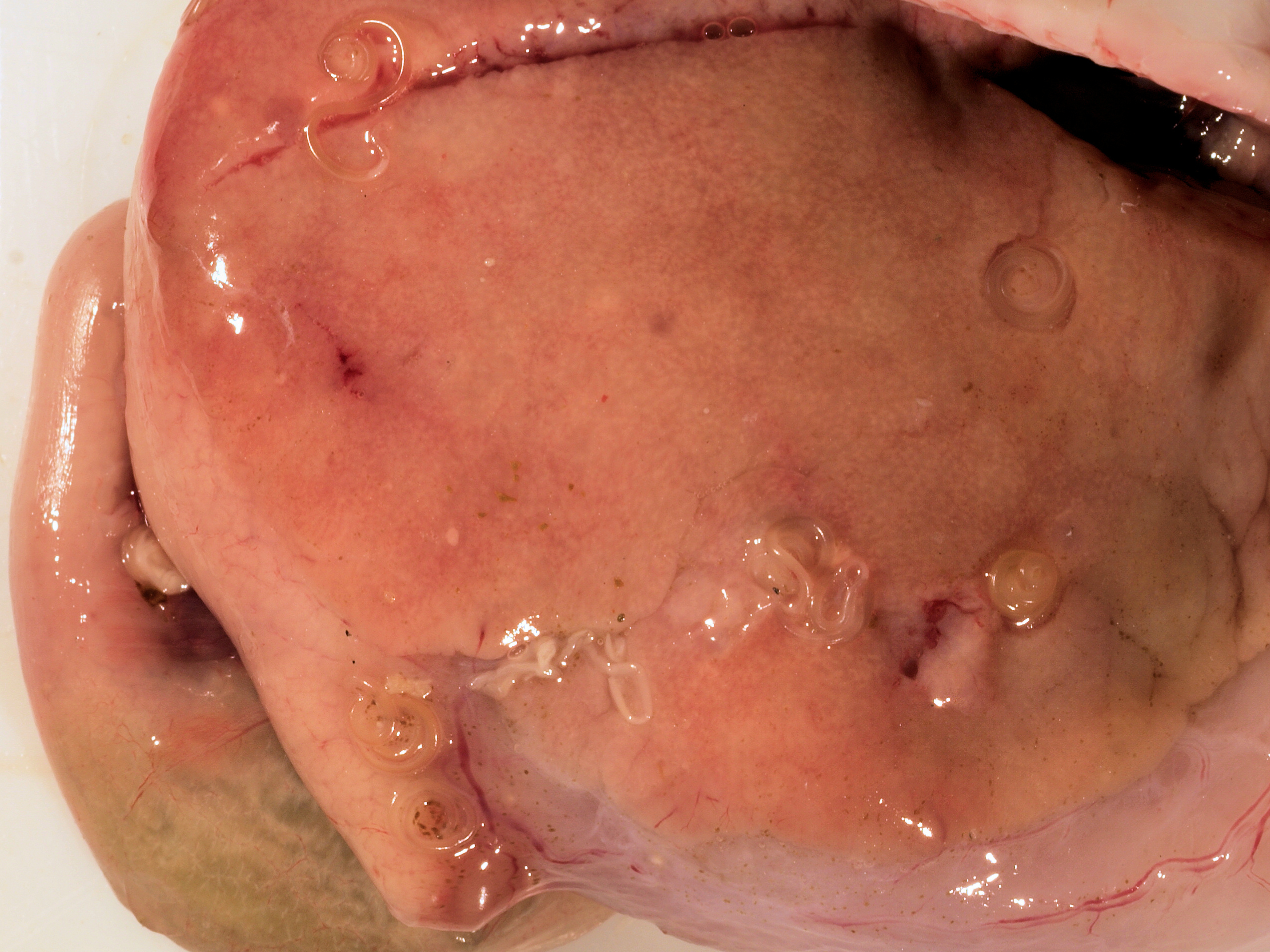
Nematode Anisakis simplex in liver of Atlantic cod

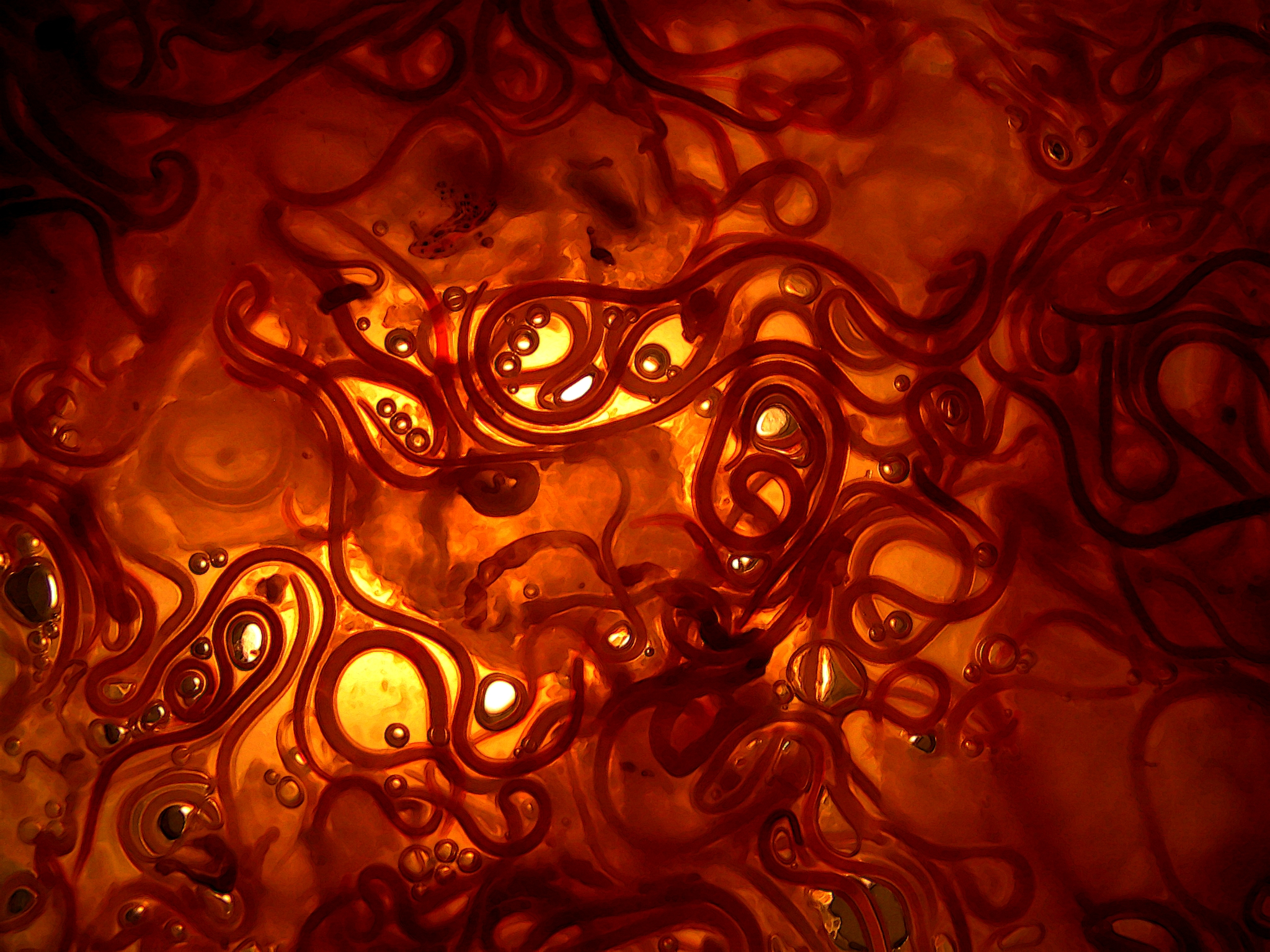
Nematode Pseudoterranova decipiens

Atlantic cod act as intermediate, paratenic, or definitive hosts to a large number of parasite species; 107 taxa are listed by Hemmingsen and MacKenzie (2001) with seven new records by Perdiguero-Alonso et al. (2008). The predominant groups of cod parasites in the northeast Atlantic were trematodes (19 species) and nematodes (13 species), including larval anisakids, which comprised 58.2% of the total number of individuals. Parasites of Atlantic cod include copepods, digeneans, monogeneans, acanthocephalans, cestodes, nematodes, myxozoans and protozoans:

Monogenea

- Diclidophora merlangi

Trematoda – metacercariae

- Bucephalinae gen. sp.
- Cryptocotyle lingua
- Otodistomum sp.
- Prosorynchoides gracilescens
- Prosorhynchus crucibulum
- Rhipidocotyle sp.

Trematoda – adult

- Derogenes varicus
- Fellodistomum sp.
- Gonocerca phycidis
- Hemiurus communis
- Hemiurus levinseni
- Hemiurus luehei
- Lecithaster sp. ?gibbosus
- Lepidapedon elongatum
- Lepidapedon rachion
- Opechona bacillaris
- Podocotyle reflexa
- Stephanostomum spp.
- Steringotrema sp.

Cestoda – larval forms

- Grillotia sp.
- Hepatoxylon sp.
- Lacistorhynchus sp.
- Scolex pleuronectis
- Pseudophyllidea fam. gen. sp.
- Schistocephalus gasterostei
- Trypanorhyncha fam. gen. sp.
- Unidentified plerocercoids

Cestoda – adult

- Abothrium gadi

Nematoda – larval forms

- Anisakis simplex (s.l.)
- Contracaecum osculatum (s.l.)
- Hysterothylacium aduncum
- Hysterothylacium rigidum
- Pseudoterranova decipiens (s.l.)
- Rhapidascaris sp.

Nematoda – adults

- Ascarophis morrhuae
- Ascarophis crassicollis
- Ascarophis filiformis
- Capillaria gracilis
- Cucullanus cirratus
- Cucullanus sp.
- Hysterothylacium aduncum
- Spinitectus sp.

Acanthocephala – post-cystacanths

- Corynosoma semerme
- Corynosoma strumosum

Acanthocephala – adults

- Echinorhynchus gadi (s.l.)

Hirudinea – adults

- Calliobdella nodulifera
- Johanssonia arctica

Copepoda - larval forms

- Caligus sp. copepodite
- Copepoda fam. gen. sp. copepodite

Copepoda – adults

- Acanthochondria soleae
- Caligus curtus
- Caligus diaphanus
- Caligus elongatus
- Chondracanthus ornatus
- Clavella adunca
- Holobomolochus confusus
- Lernaeocera branchialis

Amphipoda

- Lafystius sturionis

Isopoda

- Gnathia elongata (praniza larva)
