= Microcotyle constricta =

Scientific classification
- Kingdom: Animalia
- Phylum: Platyhelminthes
- Class: Monogenea
- Order: Mazocraeidea
- Family: Microcotylidae
- Genus: Microcotyle
- Species: M. constricta

Binomial name
- Microcotyle constricta Robinson, 1961

Species of worms

Microcotyle constricta is a species of monogenean, parasitic on the gills of a marine fish. It belongs to the family Microcotylidae.

== Taxonomy ==
Microcotyle constricta was first described by Robinson in 1961 from the gills of the New Zealand blue cod Parapercis colias (Pinguipedidae) based on one specimens (one sectioned). In 1965, Dillon & Hargis redescribed this species based on 20 specimens and gave additional information regarding buccal organs, seminal receptacle position and egg.

== Morphology ==
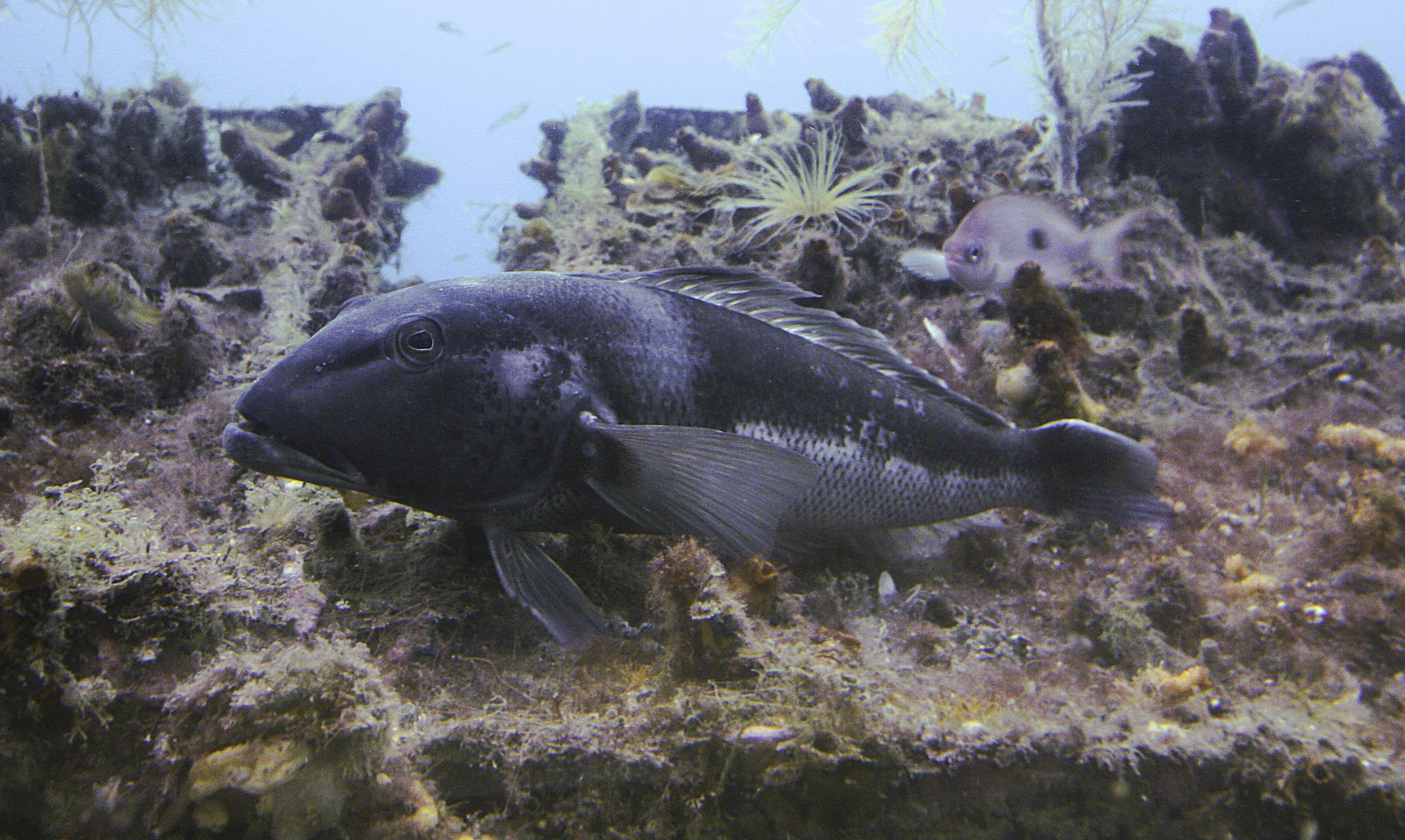
The New Zealand blue cod Parapercis colias is the type host of Microcotyle constricta

Microcotyle constricta has the general morphology of all species of Microcotyle, with a symmetrical elongate body, rounded anteriorly and comprising an anterior part which contains most organs and a posterior part called the haptor. The haptor is symmetrical, and bears 74-82 rectangular clamps, arranged as two rows, one on each side. The clamps of the haptor attach the animal to the gill of the fish. There are also two oval septate buccal suckers at the anterior extremity. The digestive organs include an anterior, terminal mouth, a rounded pharynx, an enlarged oesophagus immediately posterior to the pharynx and, which extends to the level of the posterior margin of the genital atrium, and a posterior intestine with two lateral branches provided with numerous secondary branches. The left branch extends into the haptor. Each adult contains male and female reproductive organs. The reproductive organs include an anterior circular genital atrium located approximately midway between the buccal suckers and body constriction, armed with numerous elongate rose-thorn shaped spines, a medio-dorsal vagina located at level of body constriction, a single tubular coiled ovary and 18-25 follicular testes which are posterior to the ovary and closely packed.

== Diagnosis ==
Microcotyle constricta most closely resembles Microcotyle ditrematis, but differs in clamps' width and structure; the rounded genital atrium; the rounded anterior end of body and the constriction at level of the vaginal pore.

== Hosts and localities ==
The type-host of Microcotyle constricta is the New Zealand blue cod Parapercis colias (Pinguipedidae). The type-locality is off New Zealand. Dillon & Hargis reported this species from the type-host and locality.
