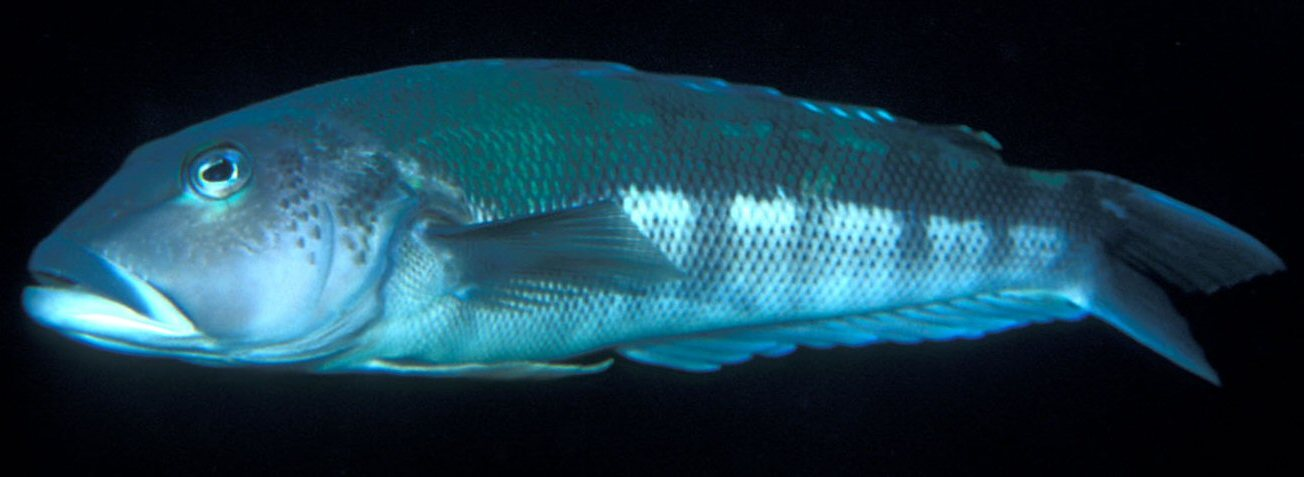

Conservation status
- Least Concern (IUCN 3.1)

Scientific classification
- Kingdom: Animalia
- Phylum: Chordata
- Class: Actinopterygii
- Order: Labriformes
- Family: Pinguipedidae
- Genus: Parapercis
- Species: P. colias

Binomial name
- Parapercis colias (Forster, 1801)

Synonyms
- Percis nicthemera Cuvier in Cuvier & Valenciennes, 1829; Enchelyopus colias Forster in Bloch & Schneider, 1801

= Blue cod =

Species of ray-finned fish

The New Zealand blue cod (Parapercis colias) is a temperate marine ray-finned fish of the family Pinguipedidae. It is also known as Boston blue cod, New Zealand cod, and sand perch, and by its Māori names, rāwaru, pākirikiri, and patutuki.

It is exclusively found in New Zealand, in shallow waters around rocky coasts to a depth of 150 m (490 ft), though it is far more common south of Cook Strait. It is bluish green to blue-black above with white toward the belly. Large examples are usually greenish blue in colour, while smaller ones are blotched in varying shades of brown. An adult may grow to 60 cm (24 in) in length and weigh from 1.0 to 3.0 kg (2.2 to 6.6 lb). It feeds mainly on small fish and crabs. Blue cod is territorial. Spawning takes place in southern spring. Blue cod can also change sex from female to male.

It is an important recreational species in the South Island and is commercially harvested. Blue cod populations are managed under New Zealand's fisheries quota management system, although they are becoming scarce in some small areas due to fishing pressure. Annual catch range is between 2,000 and 2,500 tonnes.

== Names ==
Parapercis colias is most commonly known as the blue cod (or more specifically the New Zealand blue cod or less commonly the Boston blue cod). It is also known in English as the New Zealand cod or the sand perch. In the indigenous Māori language, the species has a variety of names: kopukopu, pākirikiri, pātutuki, rāwaru and taipua.

== Identification ==
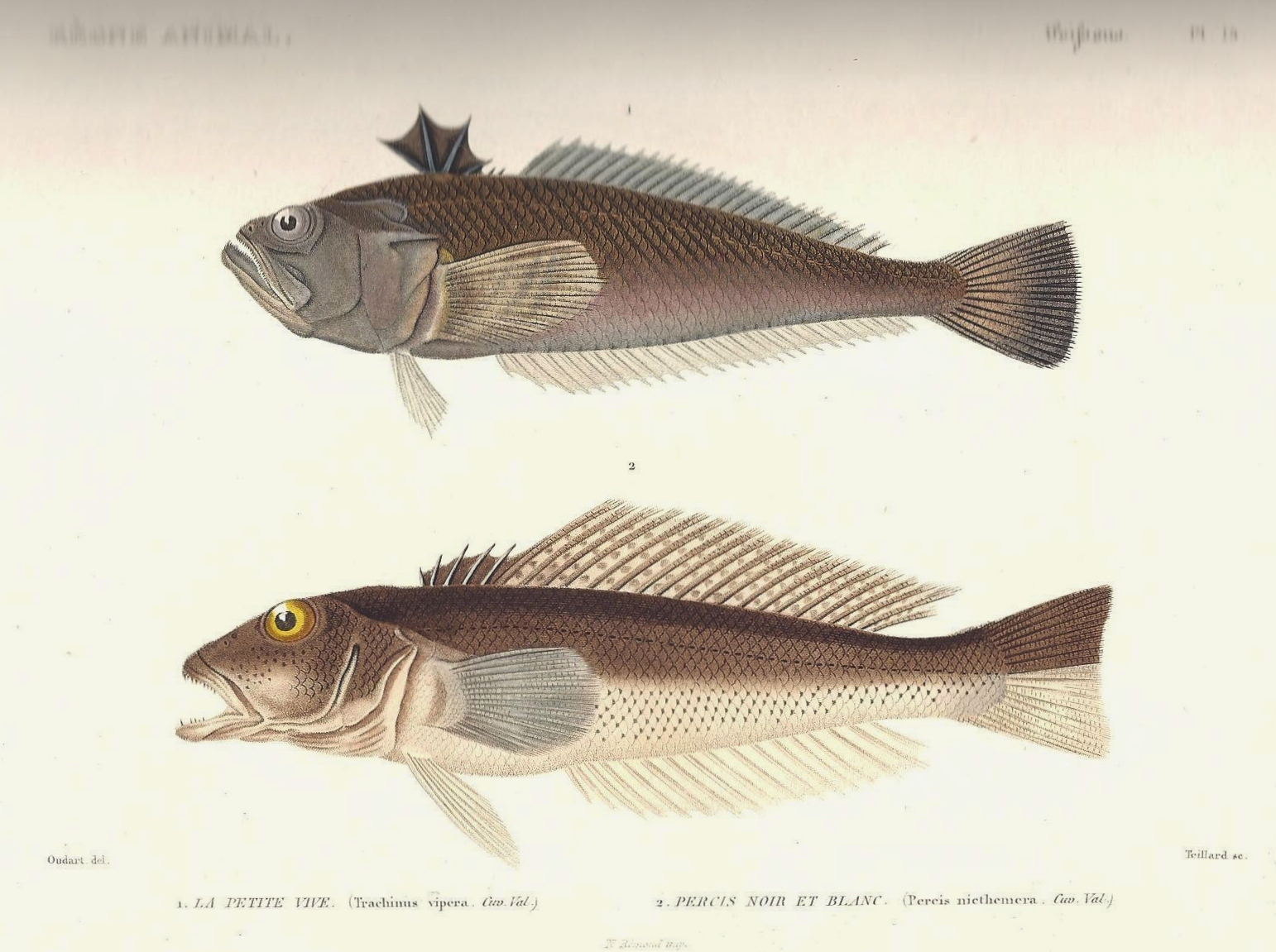
1828 diagrams by Georges Cuvier

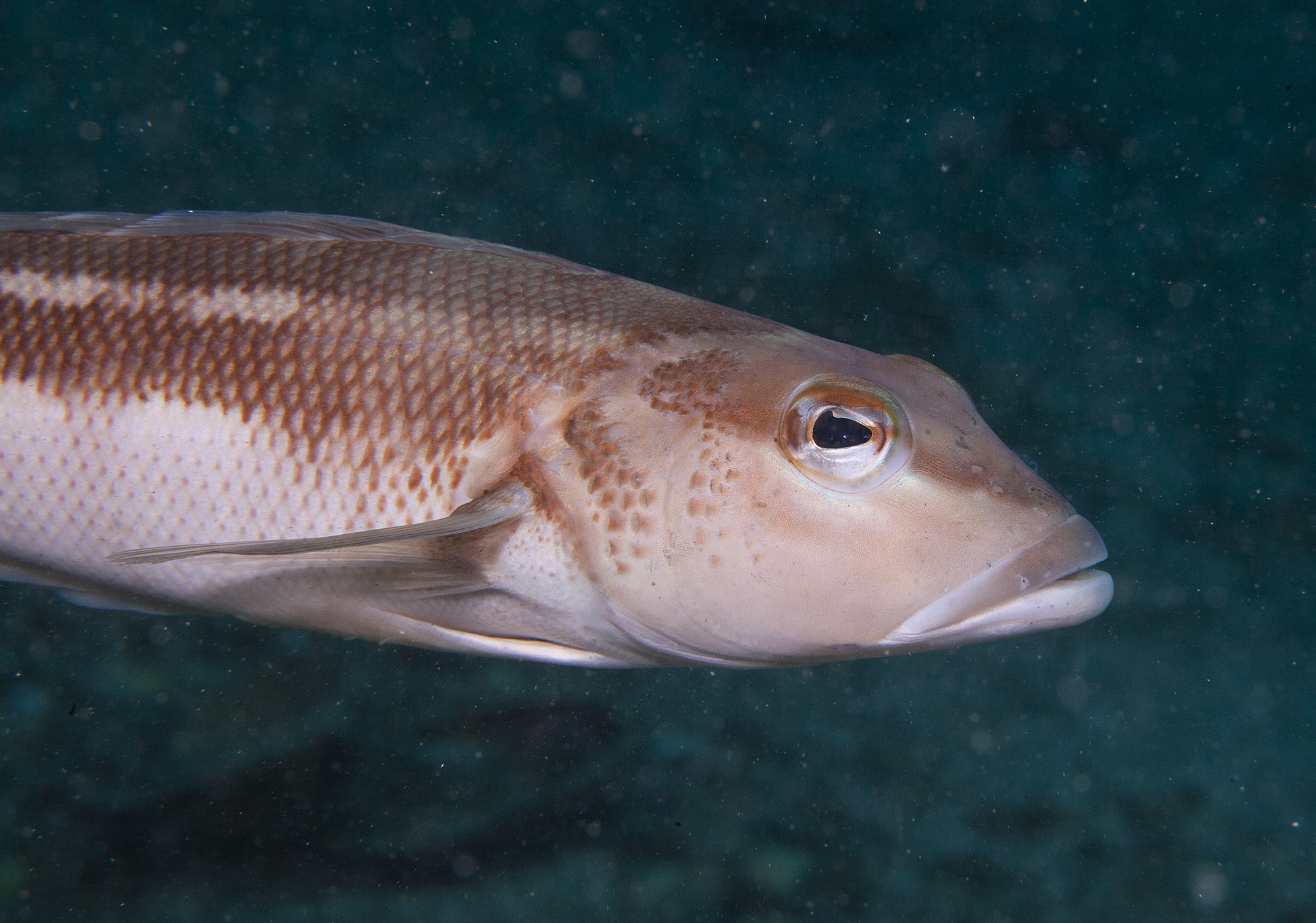
Parapercis colias female showing brown colour phase, details of the eye and lips.

Parapercis colias are protogynous hermaphrodites, which means they have both female and male reproductive organs at the beginning and some females change sex to males later in their life. P. colias is a marine bottom dwelling fish that is found in coastal New Zealand waters. Their colouring varies by age and sex. Juveniles start off being generally pale in colour and have two long dark stripes along the sides which will turn brown and barely distinguishable when they become middle-sized fish. As they mature with a body length over 25 cm, both sexes would have a blueish-grey dorsal with a white underside. Females have a tinge of orange and there is a trend for them to become green when they grow larger. Brownish pigments can be found at the base of pectoral fin. On the other hand, adult males have distinctive blue-grey colour coat with greenish sides and a golden brown line can be found above each eye. Body length of P. colias is about 30–40 cm in general, but can up to 60 cm and their weight is 0.8–1.5 kg in general, but can up to 3 kg. Males tend to be larger than females. They can live up to 32 years old.

Heads of P. colias are prominent and rounded with scales. They have a plump shaped body covered with firm scales. Above their non expanded cheeks are two large lateral eyes which can rotate independently, this allows them to see almost everywhere around them. P. colias possess a terminal mouth with bulbous lips. Their pelvic fins are generally placed forward on the throat with brown dots appear underneath it. There is a single horizontal stripe where ten to twelve scales above across their side of the body. The anterior section of their dorsal fin is small and short, followed by fins with five short spines. In contrast their second dorsal is long. A key used in an article of Cantwell can distinguish P. colias from other parapercids. Key features are listed below:

- The outer row of lower jaw has eight teeth
- Dorsal spines longer to the posterior (rear end)
- Soft dorsal fins have 20 rays and anal fins with 17
- 10 to 11 scales are present from lateral line to base of first soft dorsal ray
- 23 to 26 counts of gill rakers
- Caudal (tail) fins have 15 branched rays that looks rounded but bi-lobed.

Other characters of detailed skeleton structures (osteology) of Parapercis species can be found in an article written by Gosline.

Swimming bladder is usually present in osteichthyids, it helps the fish to stay at a certain water pressure level (depth) without spending more energy. Swimming bladder in P. colias are absent. They will automatically sink to the sea floor if they stop swimming; therefore, they are called bottom-dwelling or sedentary bottom-hugging species. Their body shape of having a flattened abdomen indicates this as well. Normally, P. colias use their pectoral fin to swim, their body muscles and tails fin are only involved in swimming when a sudden burst or speed is needed, this type of swimming character is called labriform. As a result, their pelvic fins, used as props when they are resting on the seabed, are reduced and thickened. Due to their nature of being bottom-dwelling species, sand can clog their gills when they are resting. To remedy this, P. colias often hold their breath and open their mouths for a long interval like having a yawn to take good gulps of air every now and then. Speaking of having a yawn, if you look closely you will notice that P. colias do not have palatine teeth and only have small teeth; however, you would not want to feel their sharp and well developed pharyngeal teeth near their throat like their prey.

There are some other detailed morphological characteristics inside the body of P. colias that determine their taxonomy, such as the presence of a lentiform body (an ocular vascular structure) and others, are mentioned by Eastman.

== Distribution ==
=== Natural global range ===
Pinguipedid fishes (Sandperches) are widely found in the southern Atlantic and Indo-Pacific regions. However, P. colias is endemic to New Zealand.

=== New Zealand range ===
P. colias is found from the shore to the shelf edge around New Zealand's entire coastline, but there are no records in either the Kermadec Islands or the Snares Islands. They are more abundant south of Cook Strait and they are an iconic species for the South Island. They are most common around Southland and the Chatham Islands.

== Habitat preferences ==
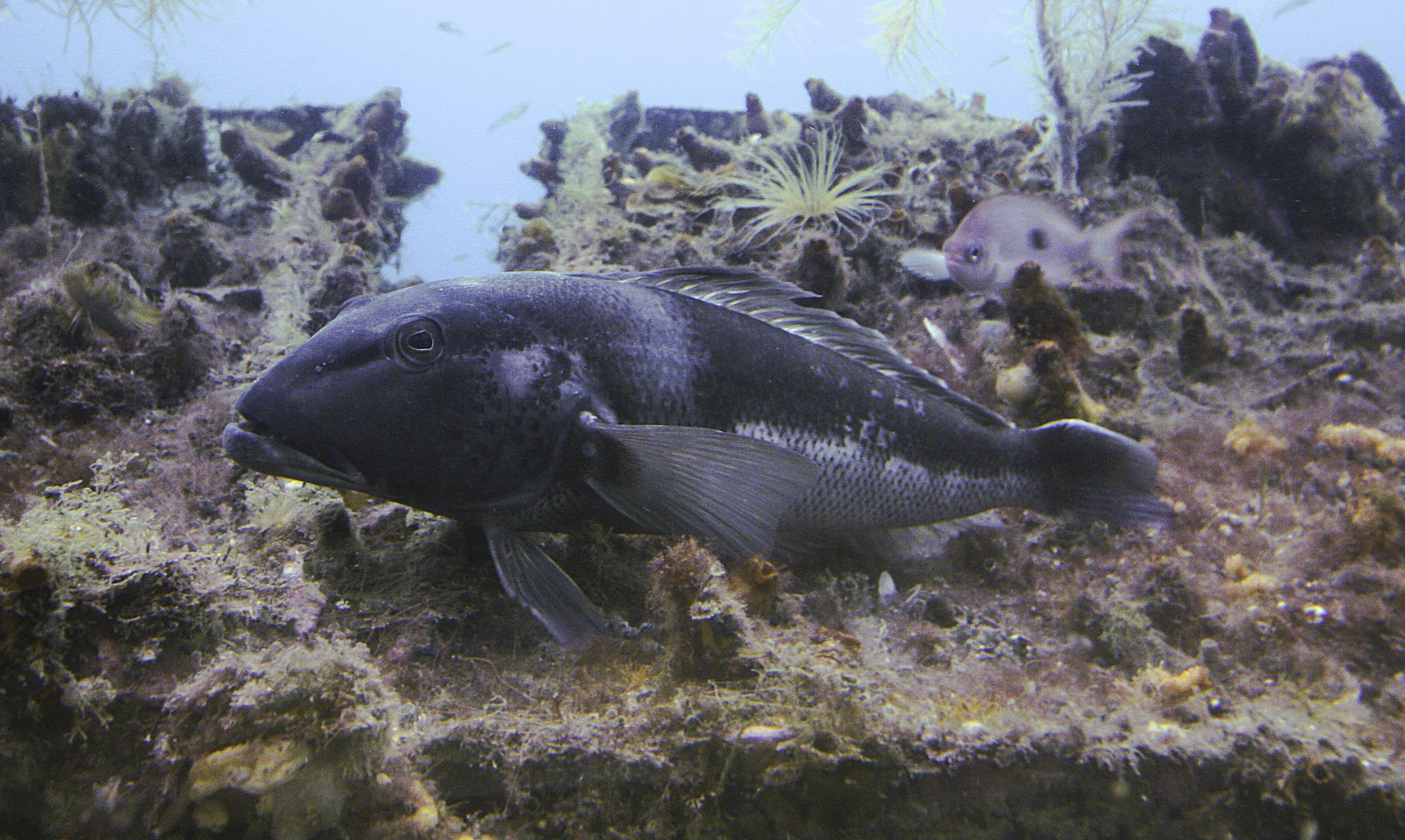
Blue cod in Milford Sound on a bedrock outcrop

P. colias can be found at 150 m in depth occupying bedrock outcrops on gravel or sandy seabed. These habitats with macro algae or sponges are even more preferred. Furthermore, their abundance in each habitat varies between age. Juvenile are found more frequently in sponge gardens (more than 16m deep) dominated by orange finger sponges (Raspalia topsenti & Raspalia flaccida), large black massive sponge (Ancorina alata) and the small bright yellow clumps of Polymastia granulosa that provide more shelters and safer refuges, whereas adults are mainly found on reef margins and deeper areas.

Since P. colias are generalists, which means that they prey on various species instead of depending on only one species, habitats that are rich in diversity of species are also favoured by them. An example of this is the kelp forest which is often established on rock beds where it is also desirable for P. colias. However, they can be also found in less species diverse habitats such as barren rock flats (4-12m deep) that are dominated by sea urchins grazing on algae.

As mentioned before, P. colias can be found at 150 m in depth and was reported to be caught at 350m below the surface, other important aspects such as temperature, salinity and oxygen content in the ocean are often influenced by water depth. 766 samples were taken to determine the water temperature and chemistry ranges of P. colias as listed below:

Temperature:	7.786 - 18.158	(°C)
Nitrate:	0.205 - 18.689	(μmol/L)
Salinity:	34.283 - 35.544	(PPS)
Oxygen:	5.121 - 6.587	(mL/L)
Phosphate:	0.258 - 1.333	(μmol/L)
Silicate:	1.911 - 7.690	(μmol/L)

== Life cycle/phenology ==
=== Spawning and hatching ===
Multiple spawning events of a female P. colias occur throughout late winter and spring in the centre to the outer continental shelf. Instead of a distinct spawning episode, their spawning is a continuous event that the eggs are released over time. One male can be spawning with different groups of female. Eggs could possibly drift 74 km away from the spawning site and hatch potentially after 116 hours. Young fish are found below 20 metres then move to shallow water in summer.

=== Age, growth, sex and maturity ===
Growth of P. colias is measured by the relationship between age and their body length. P. colias are protogynous hermaphrodites, when the length of P. colias reaches 410mm, 50% of the females are transitional. Sex inversion occurs with the colour change from whitish with a brown band at both sides or an orange tinge to bluish colour with a blue green band. Though sex inversion found to occur across a wide range of age and size, the cause of activating the sex inversion has not been well understood. Studies have shown that the proportion of sex change decreases afterwards as the presence of males in the population would discourage sex change. Hence, it is regarded as a response to the demographic structure in the population instead of a response to their size. Another study indicated that blue cod is most fecund at the size which closes to the average size of the first maturity of males. It has been regarded as a sign of potential sex change by reducing egg production for saving the resource. Sex change is also not well described that the transitional gonads has different definitions.

Their growth rate can differ due to food supply, water temperature and habitat as other fish do. Sex can also influence the growth rate. Male grow faster and larger than female. P. colias have the potential to grow up to 50 cm in length and weight 4 kg. Growth ring interpretation shows that they can live about 10 to 15 years, but a study showed that the known maximum age of blue cod is 23 years old.

Maturity values are derived from the length of the fish. Their growth rate varies between locations. For example, male can reach maturity when their length reached 10–19 cm (which is about 2–3 years old) in Northland, but in Southland the male needs to reach 26–28 cm (which is about 4–6 years old). Besides, males generally have a faster growth rate compared to females. Both female and male P. colias are assumed to reach sexual maturity with the measuring of 28 cm. The maximum lifespan of P. colias is 32 years.

=== Behaviours ===
Similar to other Parapercis species, male P. colias hold territories and their home range increases as the individual grows. Mutch found that they tend to hold large territories rather than but loose territories with small social groups that contain three to five females. Though they hold stable territories, P. colias moves from time to time. In a study, P. colias can move with on average of 2.09±2.12 km, this could potentially be home range shifts. It is reported that P. colias emigrate from coastal to offshore waters in May of each year, this is thought to be a preparation for mating and spawning in early winter.

Thunder is known to agitate the fish. Reports since the 1950s have documented thunder activating blue cod's flight mechanisms, causing the fish to leap out of aquariums.

=== Migration ===
P. colias seem to be migratory at certain times in a year, but little is known about their migration. Other studies indicated that they are relatively sedentary, however, long-term dispersal has been suggested due to a record that one individual travelled 156 km over 20 months.

== Diet and foraging ==
Many fish species are generalists; thus, they are not limited by the predator-prey cycle. P. colias is one of them. They have been recorded to have 52 taxa in their diet, where adults are found to be more selective than juveniles. It makes sense that when P. colias grows bigger, the variety of species in their diet also increases, this includes polychaetes, crustaceans, molluscs, Pisces, algae and even its own spawn! This means that P. colias are omnivores which "feeds on more one trophic level". In short, you can say that they consume anything that is abundant and available locally. Other than the development of the fish itself, what they consume differs from region to region and whether the area is fished or not plays an important role as well. One study showed that oyster dredged habitat can reduce their prey diversity and have a negative effect on fish size. They usually stalk, seize and swallow their prey. After being caught, they tend to regurgitate the stomach contents.

"Our Big Blue Backyard" is a documentary of New Zealand marine and shoreline species. In the Chatham Islands episode, blue cod waits to feed on pāua, an endemic sea-snail that attaches itself on hard surfaces such as rocks, at its most vulnerable phases – when they move or are grasped up by a starfish using hundreds of tube feet. They are also said to be voracious.

== Predators, parasites, and diseases ==
=== Predators ===
Homo sapiens (humans) fish 2000 to 2500 tons of P. colias annually. Natural predators include:

- Great white shark
- Benthic feeders, such as:
  - Yellow-eyed penguins
  - Dolphins
- Sea birds, such as mollymawks

As many marine predators are generalists there are many other potential predators not listed. P. colias are known to predate upon juveniles of their own species.

=== Parasites ===
Hewitt and Hine summarised the parasites found on blue cod including species in five main groups:

Group	Species	Location on host
Protozoa	Trypanosoma parapercis	Blood
Digenea	Pancreadium otagoensis; Plagioporus(Caudotestis) pachysomus; Steringotrema rotundum; Lecitocladium excisum; Gonocerca phyddis	Intestine; Intestine; Gall bladder and stomach; Stomach; Stomach
Monogenea	Microcotyle constricta	Gills
Nematoda	Anisakis sp. larva; Contracaecum (Thynnascaris) sp. larva	Viscera, mesenteries and under peritoneum; Stomach, intestine and body cavity
Copepoda	Aethon percis; Caligus buechlerae	Gills; Skin

Blood sucking sea lice are also known to parasitise P. colias.

=== Disease and injuries ===
No specific disease is found on P. colias, but some injuries have been recorded. Hooking injuries could cause tissue damage and possibly lead to mortality. Despite having greater risk for parasitic, bacterial, or fungal infections, mortality after having a hook injury is often caused by blood loss rather than disease. An article suggests that small hooks cause more blood loss problems than big hooks to P. colias.

Compared to other bony fish, swimming bladder in P. colias is absent, this means that they do not suffer from barotrauma – an injury due expansion or eruption of the swimming bladder in fish, it is often caused by rapid water pressure change when rising from deep water to water surface.

== In a human context ==
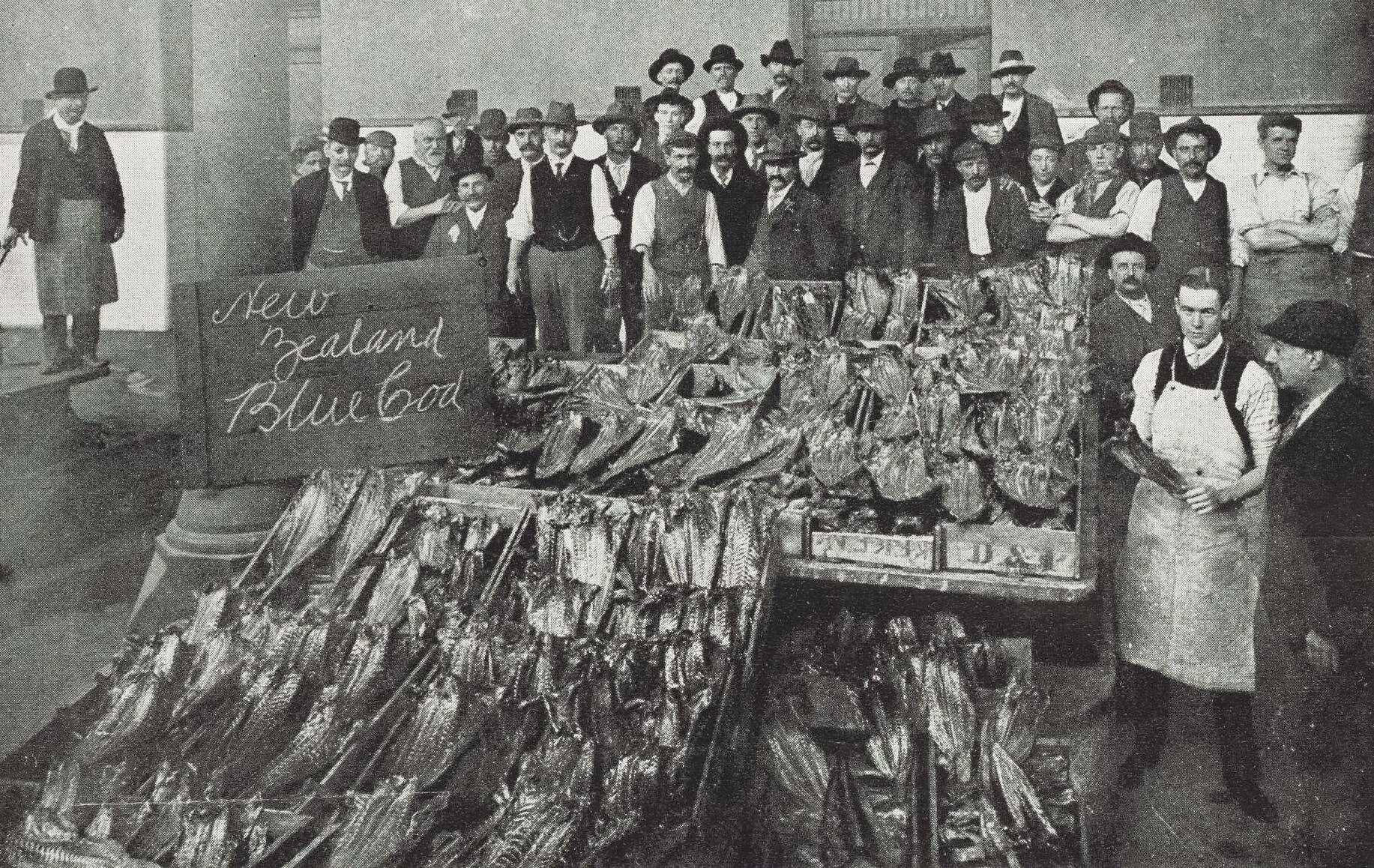
A display of smoked blue cod in Melbourne, Victoria (1907)

Rāwaru was a valued traditional food for Māori who lived in the South Island, where the fish is more abundant. Heads of rāwaru (P. colias, blue cod) were often given back to the sea as offerings to the god Maru before Māori return from fishing.

The fish was an important species to early European settlers in New Zealand as a food source, and by the 1910s became even more popular in Australia, leading to the growth of the blue cod fishing industry in Southland.

== History of the name ==
Blue cod is not a cod. The use of blue cod can date back to the time of Captain Cook. Some early writers listed them as coal-fish which derived from unrelated European fish. However, this name is so widely used in New Zealand that it is unlikely to be changed.

== Economic and population management issue ==
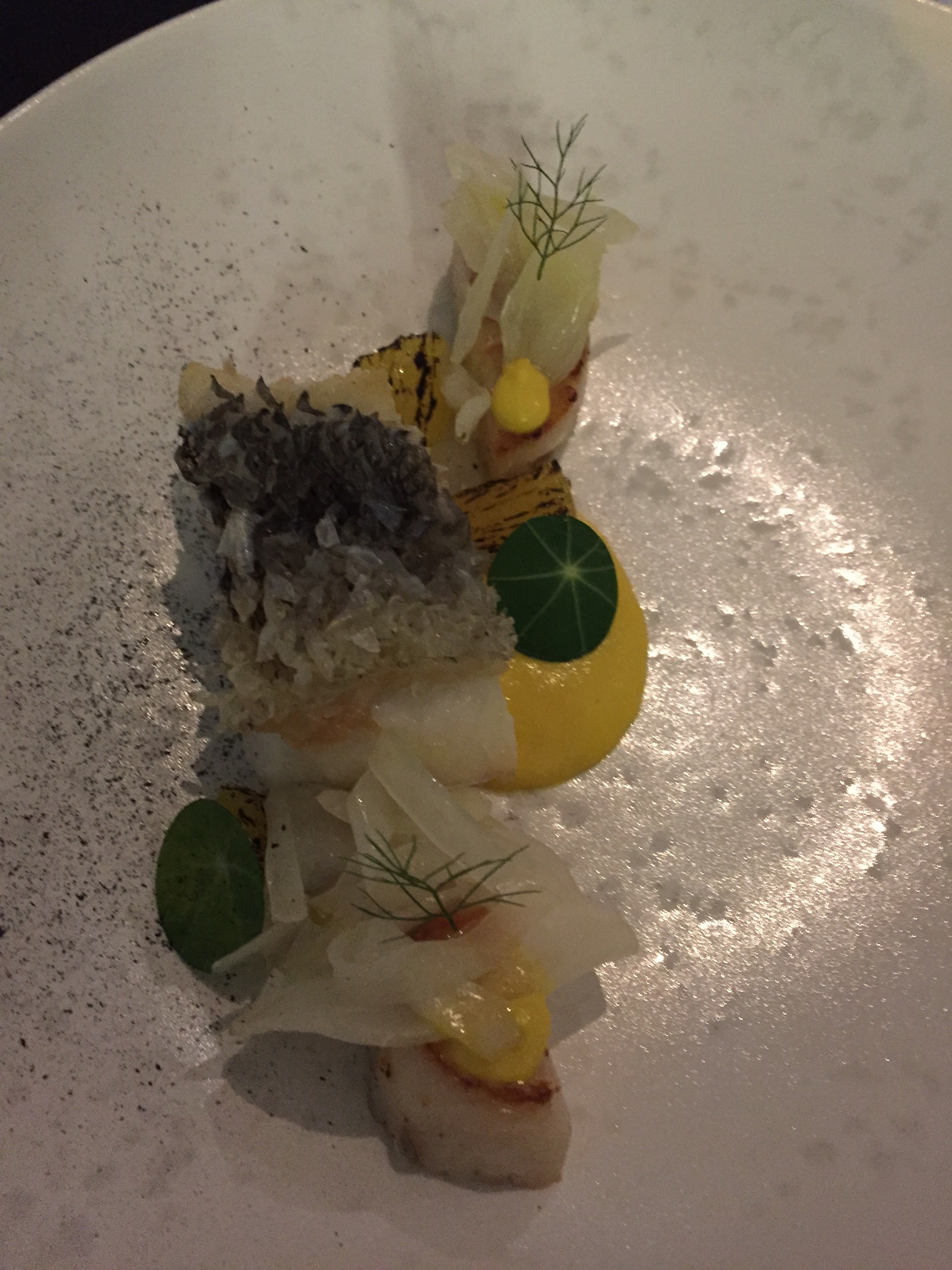
A dish of blue cod and Hokkaido scallops in a restaurant in Singapore

Blue cod is well known by the public due to its commercial and recreational importance. As mentioned before, we fish 2000 to 2500 tones of P. colias per year. The value of P. colias as being the third popular recreational fishing species cannot be ignored, this includes using their flesh as rock lobster bait. It is estimated that the marginal willingness to pay for an additional P. colias is $1.61 per fish and the average willingness to pay is $24.46 per fish. It is estimated that in 1999, 1.2 million P. colias was harvested, of which 70% were from the South Island. Thus, Ministry for Primary Industries (New Zealand) has set minimum capture length and maximum capture limit of P. colias, which varies between areas mainly depending on abundance, to avoid depletion. For example, in the South-East area (of South Island from Clarence Point to Southland and extended to the Chatham Islands, New Zealand), no fish shorter than 30 cm can be taken and each fisher has a limit up to 30 fish per day.

To achieve sustainable fishing, it is crucial to persist healthy population structure with continuous monitoring and quotas set to date. However, as the largest fish in the population would be the male, males are often being caught and is thought to affect the females changing their sex earlier. This is an emerging issue to all hermaphrodites. Surprisingly, the sex ratio male to females of P. colias is about 5:1 which is biologically implausible. This suggests that sex changes might not purely depend on fish length, but we cannot ignore the fact that fishery has changed the natural population composition of P. colias. To understand the direct impact on P. colias despite population decline further research is required.

In addition, the fundamental unit of concern of its management of population is the genetic structure that can lead to the reduction of the evolutionary potential for responding to environmental change, the increase of inbreeding risk and the force of selective genetic change. Since a number of evidence indicated that blue cod are relatively sedentary, the fishing pressure may lead to potential local depletion. Recent studies showed that the genetic differences were significant between mainland population and Chatham Island population. On the other hand, the differences within mainland populations were limited while the pattern of the isolation by distance was detected. Further research using microsatellite DNA markers suggested that some significant genetic differences between mainland population exist which indicate the potential long-distance dispersal, but the dispersal rate is too low to have demographic effect in the population.
