= Paul H. Harvey =

British evolutionary biologist

Paul Harvey CBE FRS
- Born: Paul H. Harvey; 19 January 1947 (age 79)
- Education: University of York (BA, DPhil)
- Awards: DSc (1989)
- Scientific career
- Fields: Evolutionary biology
- Workplaces: University of Oxford
- Thesis: Studies on the polymorphism of cepaea nemoralis (1971)
- Doctoral students: Oliver Pybus; Georgina Mace; Andrew Read; Andrew Rambaut
- Other notable students: Eddie Holmes
- Website: zoo.ox.ac.uk/people/view/harvey_p.htm

Paul H. Harvey CBE FRS (born 19 January 1947) is a British evolutionary biologist. He is Professor of Zoology and was head of the zoology department at the University of Oxford from 1998 to 2011 and Secretary of the Zoological Society of London from 2000 to 2011, holding these posts in conjunction with a professorial fellowship at Jesus College, Oxford.

== Education ==
Harvey was educated at the University of York where he was awarded Bachelor of Science and Doctor of Philosophy degrees.

== Research and career ==
Harvey has led the development of robust statistical methods to decipher evolutionary relationships. His work has applied a rigorous basis to the comparative method in evolutionary biology — employed since the days of Charles Darwin — and as such, he has shaped modern thinking in the field. The comparative method of evolutionary biology is used to correlate characteristics between species. Paul pioneered techniques to use the data and knowledge available in modern science, whilst avoiding artefacts, in untangling the evolutionary relationships between organisms. These problem-solving tools for evolutionary studies have become widely used.

His former students who have become Fellows of The Royal Society include Oliver Pybus, Georgina Mace, Andrew Read, Andrew Rambaut Eddie Holmes and Mark Pagel.

== Awards and honours ==
Harvey was elected a Fellow of the Royal Society (FRS) in 1992 in recognition of his status as a leading evolutionary biologist of his era. Harvey was awarded the Scientific Medal and the Frink Award from the Zoological Society of London, the J. Murray Luck Award from the National Academy of Sciences, and the University of Helsinki Medal. He is an ISI highly cited researcher.

From 2000 to 2011, he served as Secretary of the Zoological Society of London (constitutionally the Chief Executive responsible for London and Whipsnade Zoos, the Institute of Zoology, and the Conservation Programmes).

He was appointed Commander of the Order of the British Empire (CBE) in the 2008 Birthday Honours.

== Selected publications ==
- Garland Jr, Theodore; Harvey, P.H.; Ives, A.R. (1992). "Procedures for the analysis of comparative data using phylogenetically independent contrasts" (PDF). Systematic Biology. 41 (1): 18–32. doi:10.2307/2992503. JSTOR 2992503.
- Harvey, P.H. Martin, R.D., & Clutton-Brock, T.H. (1987) Life Histories in Comparative Perspective. In Primate Societies. Smuts, B.B., Cheney, D.L., Seyfarth, R.M., Wrangham, R.W., Struhsaker, T.T. (eds). Chicago & London:University of Chicago Press. pp. 181–196 ISBN 0-226-76715-9
- Harvey, P.H. & Pagel, M.D. (1991) The Comparative Method in Evolutionary Biology. Oxford Monographs in Ecology and Evolution edited by Harvey, P.H. and May, R.M.. Oxford University Press.
- Pybus, O.G.; Rambaut, A; Holmes, E.C.; Harvey, P.H. (2002). "New inferences from tree shape: numbers of missing taxa and population growth rates". Syst. Biol. 51 (6): 881–888. doi:10.1080/10635150290102582. PMID 12554454.
- Pybus, O.G.; Charleston, M.A.; Gupta, S.; Rambaut, A; Holmes, E.C.; Harvey, P.H. (2001). "The epidemic behaviour of the Hepatitis C virus". Science. 292 (5525): 2323–2325. doi:10.1126/science.1058321. PMID 11423661. S2CID 28871697.
- Freckleton, R.P.; Harvey, P.H. (2006). "Detecting Non-Brownian Trait Evolution in Adaptive Radiations". PLOS Biology. 4 (11): e373. doi:10.1371/journal.pbio.0040373. PMC 1634878. PMID 17090217.
- Kelly, C.K.; Bowler, M.G.; Pybus, O.; Harvey, P.H. (2008). "Phylogeny, niches and relative abundance in natural communities". Ecology. 89 (4): 962–970. Bibcode:2008Ecol...89..962K. doi:10.1890/07-0322.1. PMID 18481521.. Also see Leibold, Mathew A. (2008). "Ecology: Return of the niche". Nature. 454 (7200): 39–41. Bibcode:2008Natur.454...39L. doi:10.1038/454039a. PMID 18596794. and Sugden, A. M. (2008). "ECOLOGY: Deterministic Competition". Science. 320 (5878): 851a. doi:10.1126/science.320.5878.851a.
- Charlesworth, B.; Harvey, P. (2005). "John Maynard Smith. 6 January 1920 - 19 April 2004: Elected F.R.S. 1977". Biographical Memoirs of Fellows of the Royal Society. 51 (3): 253–265. doi:10.1098/rsbm.2005.0016. PMC 1448785. PMID 15579672.

Professional and academic associations
Preceded by R. McNeill Alexander	Secretary of the Zoological Society of London; 2000–2011	Succeeded by Geoffrey Boxshall
