= Edward C. Holmes =

British biologist (born 1965)

Edward C. Holmes FRS FAA
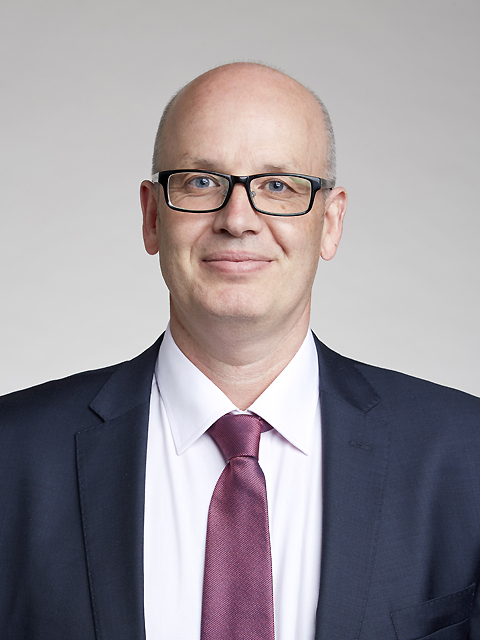
- Holmes in 2017
- Born: 26 February 1965 (age 61)
- Education: University of London (BSc); University of Cambridge (PhD)
- Known for: Molecular Evolution: A Phylogenetic Approach
- Awards: Royal Society University Research Fellowship (1994–1999); Scientific Medal, Zoological Society of London (2003); Australian Laureate Fellowship (2017)
- Scientific career
- Fields: Virology; Evolutionary biology
- Workplaces: University of Sydney; Pennsylvania State University; University of Oxford; University of Edinburgh; University of California, Davis
- Thesis: Pattern and Process in the Molecular Evolution of the Order Primates (1990)
- Academic advisors: Adrian Friday
- Website: sydney.edu.au/science/people/edward.holmes.php

Edward Charles Holmes FRS FAA (born 26 February 1965) is a British evolutionary biologist and virologist. Since 2012, he has been a fellow of the National Health and Medical Research Council (NHMRC) in Australia and professor at the University of Sydney. He was an honorary visiting professor at Fudan University in Shanghai, China, from 2019 to 2021.

== Education ==
Holmes was educated at University College London where he received a Bachelor of Science degree in Anthropology in 1986. He then moved to the University of Cambridge where he was awarded a Doctor of Philosophy degree in Zoology in 1990 for research on molecular evolution in primates supervised by Adrian Friday.

== Research and career ==
Holmes has used genomic and phylogenetic approaches to reveal the major mechanisms of virus evolution and determined the genetic and epidemiological processes that explain how viruses jump species boundaries and spread in new hosts. His work has revealed the origin, evolution and molecular epidemiology of important human pathogens including Hepatitis C, influenza, HIV and dengue, and enabled more accurate assessments of what types of virus are most likely to emerge in human populations and whether they will evolve human-to-human transmission. His recent research has provided fundamental insights into the breadth and biodiversity of the viral world.

Holmes wrote The Evolution and Emergence of RNA Viruses part of the Oxford Series in Ecology and Evolution edited by Paul H. Harvey and Robert M. May. He also co-authored the textbook Molecular Evolution: A Phylogenetic Approach with Rod Page. Since 1994 he has supervised 31 graduate students.

=== SARS-CoV-2 ===
Holmes co-authored the publication of the genome sequence of SARS-CoV-2 and the early descriptions of the disease, working with Zhang Yongzhen from Fudan University to share the first sequencing data from the virus. Holmes has figured prominently in commentary surrounding its origins. In March 2020, he co-authored a letter titled The proximal origins of SARS-CoV-2, published in Nature Medicine, which examined the mutations in the receptor-binding domain and furin cleavage site, and concluded that the virus sequence did not appear to be engineered. He co-authored a more-detailed review article in Cell.

The University of Sydney published a statement by Holmes in April that stated, "There is no evidence that SARS-CoV-2, the virus that causes COVID-19 in humans, originated in a laboratory in Wuhan, China", and that all evidence points towards its origin in an animal species. These views were reported in the Financial Times in May 2020.

=== Institutional affiliations ===
Before moving to Sydney in 2012, Holmes held academic appointments at various universities in the UK and USA including:

1990–1991	University of California, Davis, postdoctoral researcher supervised by Charles H. Langley.
1991–1993	University of Edinburgh, postdoc funded by the UK Medical Research Council (MRC).
1993–2004	University of Oxford where he was a Fellow of New College, Oxford and St Catherine's College, Oxford
2005–2012	Pennsylvania State University, Full Professor of Biology

His research has been funded by the Royal Society, the UK Biotechnology and Biological Sciences Research Council (BBSRC), Canadian Natural Sciences and Engineering Research Council (NSERC), Rhodes Trust, Wellcome Trust, United States National Institutes of Health (NIH), National Science Foundation (NSF), Australian Research Council, and Australian National Health and Medical Research Council (NHMRC).

=== Awards and honours ===
Holmes was elected a Fellow of the Australian Academy of Science (FAA) in 2015 and a Fellow of the Royal Society (FRS) in 2017. In 2017 he was awarded an Australian Laureate Fellowship. He was awarded the Scientific Medal, Zoological Society of London in 2003. In October 2020 Holmes was named NSW Scientist of the Year. In January 2021 he was jointly awarded the General Symbiont prize as an exemplar in the practice of data sharing at the Research Symbiont Awards alongside Zhang Yongzhen for sharing the first SARSCov2 genome. In November 2021 he was awarded the Prime Minister's Prize for Science. He was the recipient of the 2024 Croonian Medal and Lecture, awarded by the Royal Society.

== Personal life ==
Holmes lists his recreations as Whale Beach, New South Wales, electric guitars, and Aston Villa Football Club.

== See also ==
- Kristian G. Andersen
- Proximal Origin, a scientific and political controversy that arose from the 2020 Nature Medicine paper
- Zhang Yongzhen
