= Georgina Mace =

British ecologist (1953–2020)

Dame Georgina Mace DBE FRS
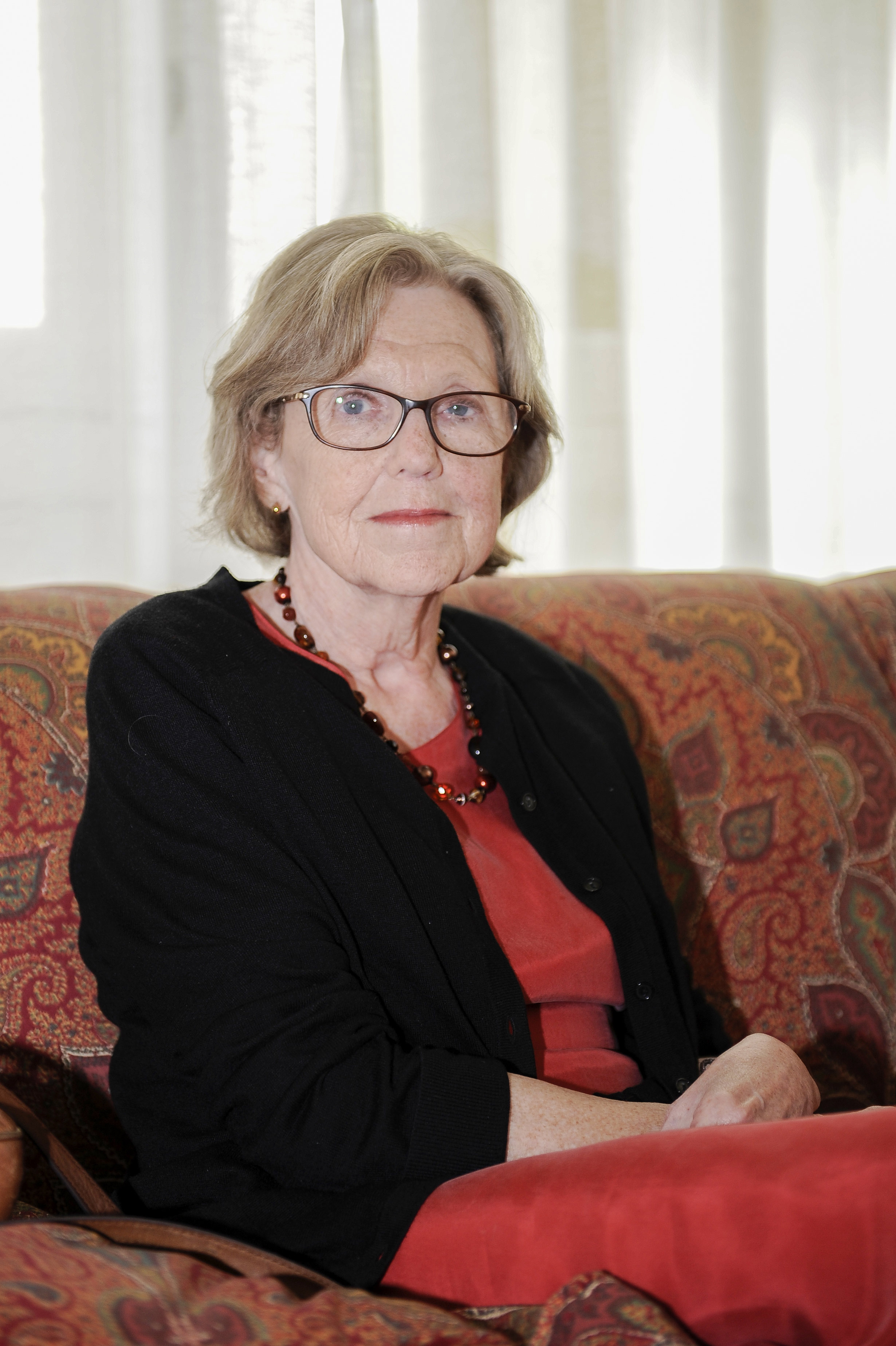
- Mace in 2019
- Born: Georgina Mary Mace; 12 July 1953; London, England
- Died: 19 September 2020 (aged 67)
- Education: City of London School for Girls
- Alma mater: University of Liverpool (BSc); University of Sussex (PhD)
- Known for: Developing the criteria for listing species in the IUCN Red List
- Spouse: Roderick O. Evans (m. 1985)
- Children: 3
- Awards: International Cosmos Prize (2007); Linnean Medal (2016)
- Scientific career
- Fields: Conservation Biology
- Institutions: University College London; Imperial College London
- Thesis: The evolutionary ecology of small mammals (1979)
- Doctoral advisor: Paul H. Harvey

Dame Georgina Mary Mace, DBE, FRS (12 July 1953 – 19 September 2020) was a British ecologist and conservation scientist. She was Professor of Biodiversity and Ecosystems at University College London, and previously Professor of Conservation Science and Director of the Natural Environment Research Council (NERC) Centre for Population Biology, Imperial College London (2006–2012) and Director of Science at the Zoological Society of London (2000–2006).

== Education ==
Georgina Mace was born in Lewisham borough of London. Her father was Dr. Bill Mace, a rheumatologist, and her mother was Josephine Mace, a nurse. and educated at the City of London School for Girls before studying at the University of Liverpool where she was awarded a Bachelor of Science degree in 1976. She was awarded a PhD on the evolutionary ecology of small mammals in 1979 from the University of Sussex for research supervised by Paul H. Harvey.

== Research and career ==
Her research interests mainly involved measuring the trends and consequences of biodiversity loss and ecosystem change. She started her career at the Smithsonian Institution to study the impact of inbreeding in zoological collections. Mace continued this work and further researched captive population ecology by studying population viability in zoos. Mace commented that "It was exciting to make quantitative scientific contributions to conservation"

She was President of the British Ecological Society, President of the Society for Conservation Biology, a member of the Science Committee of Diversitas. Mace was editor of the Philosophical Transactions of the Royal Society (Series B, Biological Sciences) from 2008 to 2010.

In 2000, Mace became Director of Science at the Institute of Zoology in London, during which time she was instrumental in developing the criteria for listing species in the IUCN Red List, the most comprehensive inventory on the conservation status of the world's species conservation contributing to the maintenance of global biodiversity and managed by IUCN. Prior to these changes, the Red List was based on nominations from experts rather than data, the changes instigated by Mace and her colleagues took 10 years to be implemented by the IUCN. Many Regional Red List publications are now increasingly based on the same criteria, which account for climate change and other environmental factors in determining extinction threats. Since 2002 she and her colleagues have worked to establish methods for evaluating biodiversity and the ecosystem services it provides, and changes in biodiversity that have been provisionally measured by the Red List Index.

Mace was also actively involved in the biodiversity sections of the "Millennium Ecosystem Assessment" which was conducted from 2002 through 2005. Mace stated that "all the evidence to date is that when societies put their mind to solving a problem, they can generally do it."

In 2006, Mace became director of the Imperial College Natural Environment Research Council's Centre for Population Biology at Silwood Park. After 2012 Mace acted as Director of the Centre for Biodiversity and Environment Research (CBER) at University College London. She was also an Academic Editor of PLOS Biology, the open access online journal and supported open-access policy to scientific publications.

In 2018, Mace was appointed as a member of the Adaptation Committee of the Committee on Climate Change, advising the UK and devolved governments on progress made in preparing for and adapting to the impacts of climate change.

== Honours and awards ==
Mace was appointed Officer of the Order of the British Empire (OBE) in 1998, Commander of the Order of the British Empire (CBE) in 2007 for services to environmental science, and Dame Commander of the Order of the British Empire (DBE) in the 2016 New Year Honours for services to science.

Mace was elected a Fellow of the Royal Society (FRS) in 2002. In July 2007 she was awarded an Honorary Doctor of Science degree by the University of Sussex for her work on biodiversity, followed by another Doctorate Honoris Causa, from the University of Lausanne, Switzerland, in 2018. She was the winner of the 2007 International Cosmos Prize. In 2011 she received the Ernst Haeckel Prize by the European Ecological Federation. In 2016 Mace won the Dr A.H. Heineken Prize for Environmental Sciences. In 2016 she was also awarded, jointly with Sandra Knapp, the Linnean Medal of the Linnean Society

She received a President's Medal from the British Ecological Society, and the 2018 BBVA Foundation Frontiers of Knowledge Award in the category of Ecology and Conservation Biology, jointly with Gretchen Daily, for developing vital tools facilitating science-based policies "to combat species loss".

The extinct rice rat Megalomys georginae from Barbados was named after her.
