= Virus Evolution (journal) =

- Discipline: Virology
- Language: English
- Edited by: Oliver Pybus, Santiago Elena

Publication details
- History: 2015–present
- Publisher: Oxford University Press
- Frequency: Continuous publication
- Open access: Yes
- Impact factor: 7.989 (2020)

Standard abbreviations
- ISO 4: Virus Evol.

Indexing
- ISSN: 2057-1577

Links
- Journal homepage

Virus Evolution is an open access scientific journal of virology published by Oxford University Press. It was launched in 2015 and focuses on all aspects of virus evolution and ecology, including the long-term evolution of viruses, viruses as a model system for studying evolutionary processes, virus classification, viral molecular epidemiology, viral phylodynamics, and environmental virology.

== Abstracting and indexing ==
Virus Evolution is indexed in Academic OneFile, Academic Search, British Library, Copyright Clearance Center, CSA, DOAJ, EBSCOhost, FIZ Karlsruhe, Google Scholar, INIST, Journal Citation Reports, OCLC ProQuest, Science Citation Index, and Zetoc. According to the latest Journal Citation Reports, the journal has a 2020 impact factor of 7.989, ranking it 4th out of 37 in the category "Virology".
