= Caligus musaicus =

Scientific classification
- Kingdom: Animalia
- Phylum: Arthropoda
- Class: Copepoda
- Order: Siphonostomatoida
- Family: Caligidae
- Genus: Caligus
- Species: C. musaicus

Binomial name
- Caligus musaicus Cavaleiro, Santos & Ho, 2010

Species of crustacean

Caligus musaicus is a sea louse species that parasitises the European flounder (Platichthys flesus); it was discovered off Portugal.
