= Oliver Pybus =

Oliver George Pybus is a British biologist. He is professor of evolution and infectious disease at the University of Oxford and professor of infectious diseases at the Royal Veterinary College. He is also editor-in-chief of the journal Virus Evolution and co-director of the Oxford Martin School Program for Pandemic Genomics. He is known for his work on the evolution and epidemiology of viruses and for helping to establish the field of phylodynamics.

== Education ==
Pybus obtained his B.Sc. in genetics from the University of Nottingham, where he studied with Bryan Clarke, followed by a DPhil from the University of Oxford in 2000 under the supervision of Paul Harvey.

== Awards and recognition ==
In recognition of his work, he has received several awards including the Scientific Medal of the Zoological Society of London in 2009, the Daiwa Adrian Prize in 2010, an ERC Consolidator Award in 2014, and the Mary Lyon Medal of the Genetics Society in 2019, and in 2022 he was elected as a Fellow of the Royal Society. He was elected a Fellow of the Academy of Medical Sciences (FMedSci) in 2026.
