= The proximal origin of SARS-CoV-2 =

2020 letter on the origins of COVID-19

The proximal origin of SARS-CoV-2, a letter published in Nature Medicine in March, 2020.

The proximal origin of SARS-CoV-2 is the title of a scientific letter published the journal Nature Medicine on March 17, 2020, shortly after the onset of the COVID-19 pandemic. The letter was influential in representing an early investigation into the origin of COVID-19, and written by prominent virologists including Kristian G. Andersen, Andrew Rambaut, W. Ian Lipkin, Edward C. Holmes and Robert F. Garry. The authors explained that the genomes of SARS-COV-2 and related coronaviruses, and the SARS-CoV-2 spike protein, suggested that the virus spilled into human populations naturally via zoonosis, and not through a laboratory leak.

In 2023, House Republicans released private messages shared by the authors of the paper, expressing a range of views, including credibility for a lab leak hypothesis, not included in the final and peer-reviewed publication.

== Background ==
From the early outbreak of the COVID-19 pandemic, rumors and speculation arose about the possible lab origins of SARS-CoV-2, the causative agent of the COVID-19 disease. Different versions of the lab origin hypothesis present different scenarios in which a bat-borne progenitor of SARS-CoV-2 may have spilled over to humans, including a laboratory-acquired infection of a natural or engineered virus. Some early rumors focused on the deliberate leak of a virus as a bioweapon or accidental leak of an engineered virus. In an earlier email obtained by public records request, Proximal Origins lead author Kristian G. Andersen said they were focused on dispelling these rumors, saying "the main crackpot theories going around at the moment relate to this virus being somehow engineered with intent."

== The original publication ==
On 17 March 2020, Nature Medicine published a correspondence article titled "The proximal origin of SARS-CoV-2" that discussed the origin of the coronavirus that caused COVID-19 pandemic from genetic perspective. The article focused on analysing SARS-CoV-2's genome, and the sites that enable it to bind to human cells. It was reported by Kristian G. Andersen (The Scripps Research Institute, La Jolla), Andrew Rambaut (University of Edinburgh), W. Ian Lipkin (Mailman School of Public Health of Columbia University, New York), Edward C. Holmes (The University of Sydney, Australia) and Robert F. Garry (Tulane University, New Orleans). The scientists stated: "We offer a perspective on the notable features of the SARS-CoV-2 genome and discuss scenarios by which they could have arisen. Our analyses clearly show that SARS-CoV-2 is not a laboratory construct or a purposefully manipulated virus." It was the first scientific report to "firmly determine" that SARS-CoV-2 was not a human-made infection that came from a laboratory.

The report concluded with a statement:

The genomic features described here may explain in part the infectiousness and transmissibility of SARS-CoV-2 in humans. Although the evidence shows that SARS-CoV-2 is not a purposefully manipulated virus, it is currently impossible to prove or disprove the other theories of its origin described here. However, since we observed all notable SARS-CoV-2 features, including the optimized RBD and polybasic cleavage site, in related coronaviruses in nature, we do not believe that any type of laboratory-based scenario is plausible.

The theories postulated in the report were that the coronavirus could only have come by biological evolution in either of two ways:

1. Natural selection occurred in an animal host before infection to humans (zoonotic transmission), as indicated by the coronavirus in the Malayan pangolins (Manis javanica) that has similar spike proteins of SARS-CoV-2 essential for infecting human cells. Since bat coronavirus like RaTG13 from a Rhinolophus affinis are genetically related with SARS-CoV-2 (having ~96% genome similarity), genome mixing (recombination) in animals could have produced the human-infective viruses.
2. Natural selection produced the human coronavirus by mutation in humans. The spike protein of SARS-CoV-2 interacts with furin, an enzyme found in human cells. Furin-like sites are present in other viruses such as HIV and Ebola virus, but not in bat or pangolin coronaviruses, suggesting that the specific furin interaction developed only in humans.

== Opposition ==
Proponents of a laboratory leak argued that the authors concealed conflicts of interest related to their own research. In 2023, Republicans in the United States raised an allegation that the paper was a coverup to suppress the COVID-19 lab leak theory. Republicans alleged that a conference call between some of the letter's authors and senior scientists including Anthony Fauci, prior to the publication of the letter, was intended to cover up a laboratory leak.
