= Zhang Yongzhen =

Chinese virologist

- 张永振
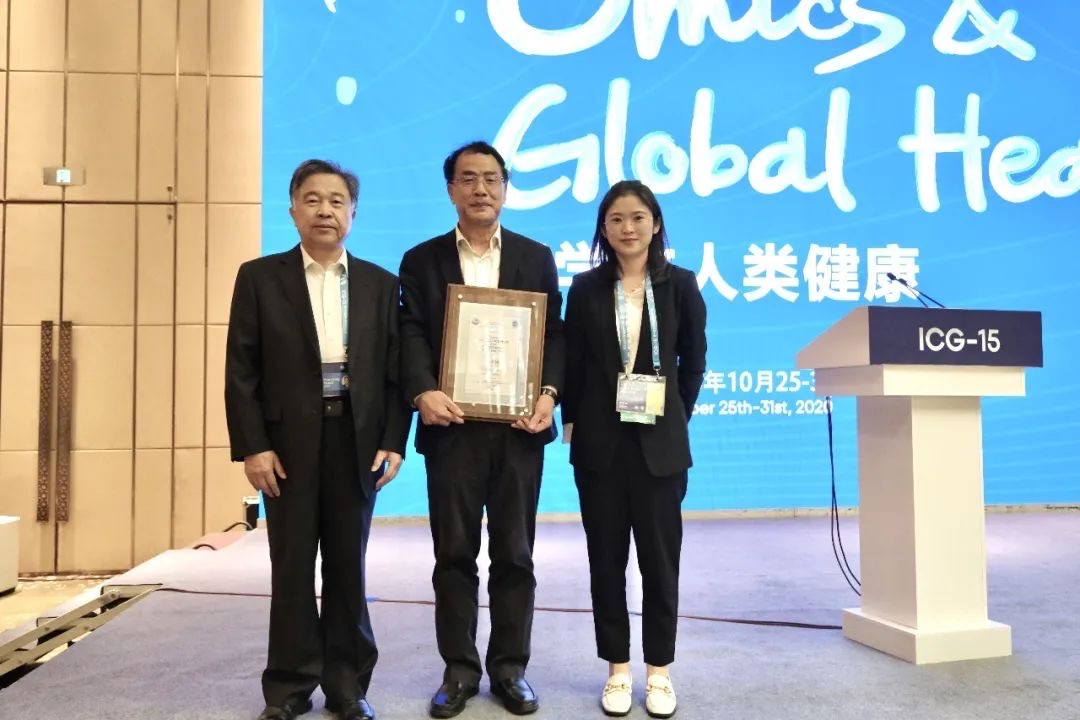
- Zhang Yongzhen in Wuhan collecting the GigaScience Prize in 2020
- Born: 1964 or 1965 (age 61–62)
- Occupation: Virologist

Zhang Yongzhen
- Traditional Chinese: 張永振
- Simplified Chinese: 张永振
Transcriptions
Standard Mandarin
- Hanyu Pinyin: Zhāng Yǒngzhèn

Zhang Yongzhen (Chinese: 张永振; pinyin: Zhāng Yǒngzhèn), also known as Yong-Zhen Zhang, is a Chinese virologist known for his work relating to the COVID-19 pandemic. A professor at Fudan University, Zhang has discovered numerous RNA viruses and created a network of labs dedicated to monitoring new viruses. He led the team that sequenced and published the genome of SARS-CoV-2, the virus that causes COVID-19, in early January 2020.

According to Time, Zhang was the "saving grace" of the COVID-19 pandemic. Zhang's team's success in discovering and publishing the virus's genome allowed scientists to quickly design COVID-19 tests, fight the pandemic, and begin developing COVID-19 vaccines. A Chinese government order prohibited labs from publishing information about the virus at the time. The day after the genome was released, Zhang's lab at the Shanghai Public Health Clinical Center was closed after a visit by officials, who issued a "rectification" order. In an interview with the academic journal Nature, Zhang said he had not been aware of the prohibition on publishing the genome. He said that the lab closure was due to the officials ordering the lab to update its biosafety protocols, because equipment had been moved during construction work, and disputed reports that the shutdown was a punishment for publishing the genome. He said his lab members were still working on influenza, and were able to resume work on the coronavirus by the end of January.

Zhang was named one of Nature's 10: "ten people who helped shape science in 2020", and was winner of the 2020 ICG-15 GigaScience Prize for Outstanding Data Sharing during the COVID-19 Pandemic. Alongside Edward C. Holmes, he was awarded the 2021 General Symbiont prize as an exemplar in the practice of data sharing at the Research Parasite Awards. He was also one of Time's 100 most influential people of 2020 and Straits Times 2020 Asians of the Year.

== Education ==
Zhang studied at South China Agricultural University, Southern Medical University, and Kunming Institute of Zoology.

== Career ==
Zhang is a professor at Fudan University in Shanghai and works at the Chinese Center for Disease Control and Prevention. His research involves RNA sequencing, and he has discovered numerous RNA viruses with collaborator Edward C. Holmes of the University of Sydney. He has created a network of labs dedicated to monitoring novel viruses.

His laboratory, a Level 3 biosafety lab, is part of the Shanghai Public Health Clinical Center.

In 2019, Zhang was given preliminary approval for funding from the Ministry of Science and Technology of China to run a national survey and database of pathogenic viruses, though as of 2020 the project was delayed by red tape.

=== COVID-19 pandemic ===
On 3 January 2020, Zhang's team received a test tube containing swabs from the initial outbreak of a pneumonia outbreak in Wuhan, caused by what would eventually be known as COVID-19. Zhang and his team were able to sequence the virus's genome by 2am on 5 January. On that day Zhang uploaded the genome to the United States National Center for Biotechnology Information and notified the Shanghai municipal health authority. Zhang also contacted Wuhan Central Hospital and the Chinese Ministry of Health, arguing that the virus was similar to SARS and that it spread by respiratory transmission. He advised "emergency public measures to protect against this disease" and the development of antiviral treatments.

On 11 January, Edward C. Holmes contacted Zhang for permission to publish the virus's genome. Zhang granted permission, and Holmes published the genome on virological.org that day. The Chinese government had prohibited labs from publishing information about the new coronavirus, though Zhang later said he did not know about the prohibition. The next day, the Shanghai Health Commission ordered Zhang's laboratory to close temporarily for "rectification". In an interview published by Nature in December 2020, Zhang said officials issued the order to update biosafety protocols. On 24 January the lab was accredited to research the novel coronavirus. Over the next three months the lab tested more than 30,000 viral samples, according to Fan Wu, another researcher involved in sequencing SARS-CoV-2.

On February 3 2020, Zhang's team's discovery was published in Nature.

Of the early response to the COVID-19 outbreak, Zhang later said, "nobody listened to us, and that's really tragic".

On Monday, 27 April 2024, Zhang said that he had been evicted from the lab; the Shanghai Public Health Clinical Center said that the lab was closed for safety reasons. As a protest, Zhang took up residence on a piece of cardboard outside the front door of the laboratory and remained there despite rain. On May 1, Zhang reported that he had been allowed back into the facility.

== See also ==
- Li Lanjuan
- Zhong Nanshan
