= Andrew F. Read =

Professor

Andrew Read
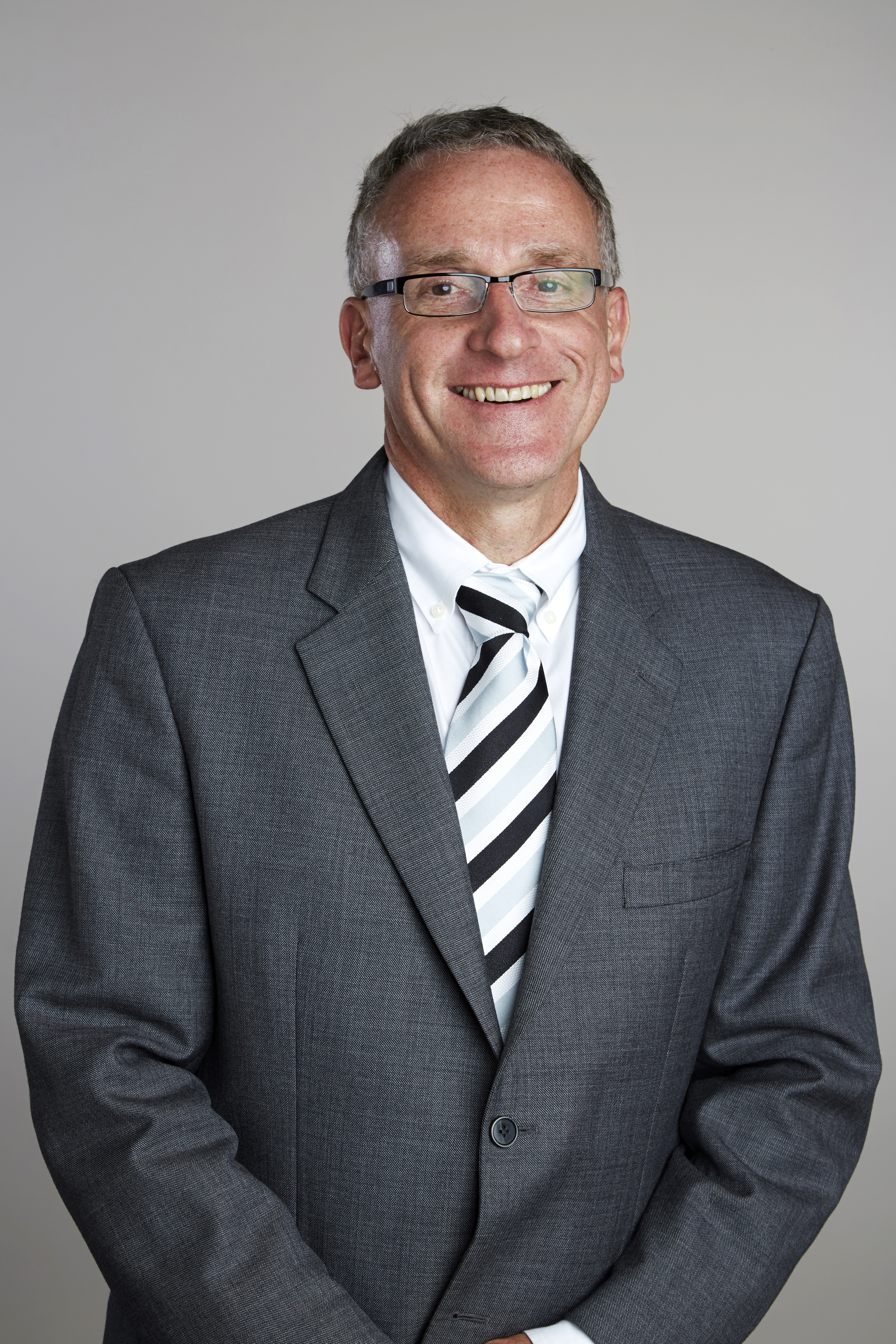
- Andrew Read in 2015, portrait via the Royal Society
- Born: Andrew Fraser Read
- Education: University of Otago (BS); University of Oxford (DPhil)
- Awards: FRS (2015); AAM Fellow (2014); FRSE (2003)
- Scientific career
- Fields: Ecology; Evolution; Infectious diseases
- Workplaces: Pennsylvania State University; University of Oxford; University of Edinburgh
- Thesis: Comparative analyses of reproductive tactics (1989)
- Doctoral advisor: Paul H. Harvey
- Website: bio.psu.edu/directory/afr3; www.thereadgroup.net/author/andrew/

Andrew Fraser Read FRS is the Senior Vice President for Research, Evan Pugh professor of biology and entomology at Pennsylvania State University and previously was the Director of the Huck Institutes of the Life Sciences at Penn State.

== Education ==
Read was educated at the University of Otago where he was awarded a Bachelor of Science degree in 1984. He moved on to the University of Oxford where he was awarded a Doctor of Philosophy degree in 1989 for research supervised by Paul H. Harvey.

== Awards and honours ==
Read was elected a Fellow of the Royal Society (FRS) in 2015. His certificate of election reads:

Andrew Read's work has revealed the evolutionary forces that shape pathogen virulence, infectivity, vaccine escape and drug resistance in a number of significant human infections. His work on malaria has provided a substantial body of experimental evidence to show that within-host selective pressures drive the evolution of both virulence and drug resistance. Integrating mathematical models with his experimental evidence, he proposed the controversial hypothesis that some vaccines can prompt evolution of more virulent pathogen strains. Recently he confirmed this hypothesis by evolving rodent malaria parasites in mice immunised with a candidate human malaria vaccine and showing virulence increased as predicted. He also developed both the theory and the proof of principle for the production of evolution-proof insecticides and provided the critical experimental evidence that animals have genetic variation in tolerance, a host defence mechanism which complements the more conventionally studied resistance.
