= Caligus infestans =

Scientific classification
- Domain: Eukaryota
- Kingdom: Animalia
- Phylum: Arthropoda
- Class: Copepoda
- Order: Siphonostomatoida
- Family: Caligidae
- Genus: Caligus
- Species: C. infestans

Binomial name
- Caligus infestans Heller, 1865

Species of sea louse

Caligus infestans is a species of sea louse in the family, Caligidae, first described by Camill Heller in 1865.

In Australia it is found as an ecto-parasite (a parasite living on the outside of its host) of fishes at depths of 200 metres in the following IMCRA zones - Central Eastern Shelf Transition (39), Northeast Shelf Province (40), and the Northeast Shelf Transition - that is, in seas off the north east coast of Australia.

A search of the Smithsonian Invertebrates Collection reveals they have also been found off:

- the Greater Sunda Islands (host - Scomberomorus commerson) USNM 180506
- Phuket (host - Scomberomorus commerson) USNM 180517
- Indian Ocean (host - Scomberomorus commerson) USNM 180518

and Madagascar and Mozambique (all with the same host).
