= Virological.org =

Virus discussion and sharing forum

virological.org
- Website type: Discussion forum
- Available in: English
- Founded: November 2014
- Owner: Andrew Rambaut
- Website: virological.org
- Commercial: No
- Registration: Required for posting (invite-only)
- Launched: November 2014; 11 years ago

Virological.org is a discussion forum for the pre-publication sharing and discussion of pathogenic virus sequence data. The forum was launched in November 2014 by Andrew Rambaut. Scientists have often used the forum to publicly share the first available outbreak sequences, e.g. during the SARS-CoV-2 pandemic, the 2022–2023 mpox outbreak, and the Ebola virus epidemic in Guinea.

== Overview ==
Virological.org is used for rapid pre-publication dissemination of public health related information by a community of virologists, phylogeneticists and epidemiologists.

== See also ==
- Bioinformatics
- GISAID
