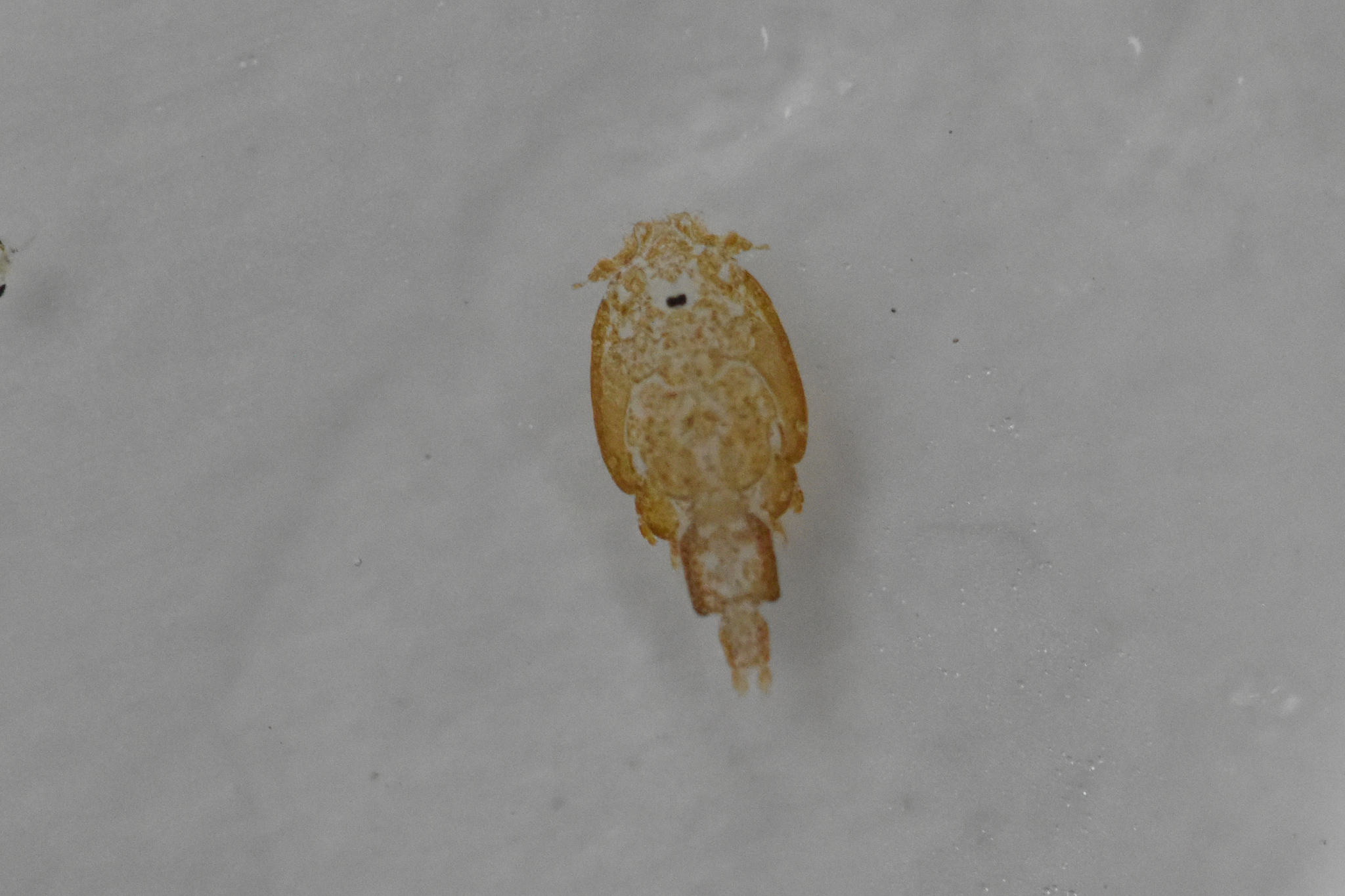

Scientific classification
- Domain: Eukaryota
- Kingdom: Animalia
- Phylum: Arthropoda
- Class: Copepoda
- Order: Siphonostomatoida
- Family: Caligidae
- Genus: Caligus; O. F. Müller, 1785

Type species
- Caligus curtus O. F. Müller, 1785

Synonyms
- Caligulus Heegaard, 1962; Cresseyella Bezděk & Cressey, 2004; Midias C. B. Wilson., 1911; Pseudocaligus A. Scott, 1901; Risculus Leach, 1819; Sciaenophilus Van Beneden, 1852

= Caligus =

Genus of crustaceans

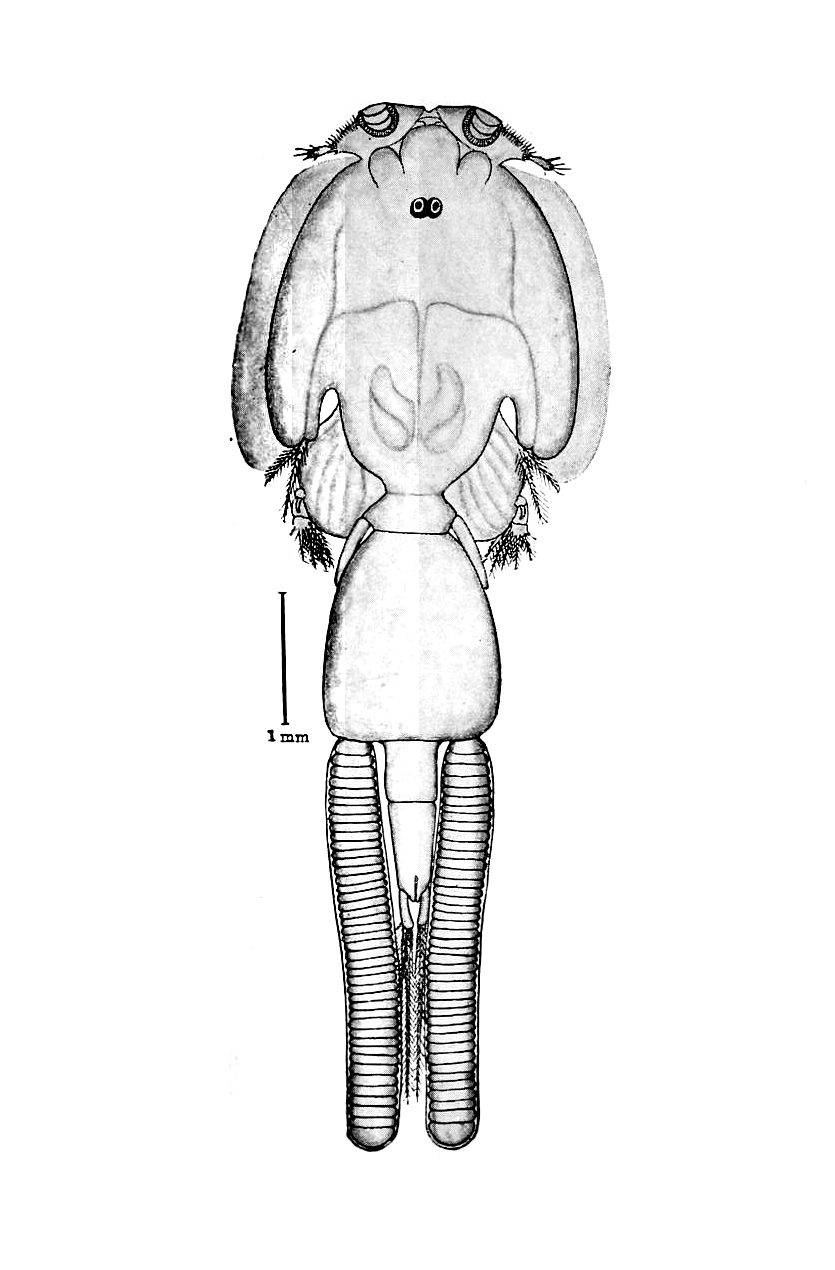
Caligus chelifer

Caligus is a genus of sea lice in the family Caligidae. The species are parasites of marine fishes and could be vectors of viruses. As of 2017, the World Register of Marine Species includes the following species:

- Caligus absens Ho, Lin & Chen, 2000
- Caligus acanthopagri Lin, Ho & Chen, 1994
- Caligus aduncus Shen & Li, 1959
- Caligus aesopus C. B. Wilson, 1921
- Caligus affinis Heller, 1866
- Caligus afurcatus C. B. Wilson, 1913
- Caligus alaihi A. G. Lewis, 1968
- Caligus amblygenitalis Pillai, 1961
- Caligus antennatus Boxshall & Gurney, 1980
- Caligus apodus (Brian, 1924)
- Caligus arii Bassett-Smith, 1898
- Caligus ariicolus C. B. Wilson, 1928
- Caligus asperimanus Pearse, 1951
- Caligus asymmetricus Kabata, v
- Caligus atromaculatus C. B. Wilson, 1913
- Caligus balistae Steenstrup & Lütken, 1861
- Caligus belones Krøyer, 1863
- Caligus berychis C. B. Wilson, 1935
- Caligus biaculeatus Brian, 1914
- Caligus bicycletus Heegaard, 1945
- Caligus bifurcus Shen, 1958
- Caligus biseriodentatus Shen, 1957
- Caligus bocki Heegaard, 1943
- Caligus bonito C. B. Wilson, 1905
- Caligus brevicaudatus A. Scott, 1901
- Caligus brevicaudus Pillai, 1963
- Caligus brevipedis Bassett-Smith, 1896
- Caligus brevis Shiino, 1954
- Caligus buechlerae Hewitt, 1964
- Caligus callaoensis Duran, 1980
- Caligus callyodoni Prabha & Pillai, 1986
- Caligus calotomi Shiino, 1954
- Caligus carangis Krøyer, 1863
- Caligus centrodonti Baird, 1850
- Caligus chamelensis Morales-Serna, Pinacho-Pinacho, Gómez & Pérez-Ponce de León, 2014
- Caligus cheilodactyli Krøyer, 1863
- Caligus chelifer C. B. Wilson, 1905
- Caligus chiastos Lin & Ho, 2003
- Caligus chorinemi Krøyer, 1863
- Caligus chrysophrysi Pillai, 1985
- Caligus clavatus Kirtisinghe, 1964
- Caligus clemensi Parker & Margolis, 1964
- Caligus confusus Pillai, 1961
- Caligus constrictus Heller, 1865
- Caligus cookeoli Ho & Lin, 2010
- Caligus cordiventris Shiino, 1952
- Caligus cordyla Pillai, 1963
- Caligus cornutus Heegaard, 1962
- Caligus coryphaenae Steenstrup & Lütken, 1861
- Caligus cossacki Bassett-Smith, 1898
- Caligus costatus Shen & Li, 1959
- Caligus cresseyorum Kabata, 1992
- Caligus crusmae Castro-Romero & Baeza-Kuroki, 1982
- Caligus cunicephalus Gnanamuthu, 1950
- Caligus curtus O. F. Müller, 1785
- Caligus cybii Bassett-Smith, 1898
- Caligus dactylopteni Uma Devi & Shyamasundari, 1981
- Caligus dakari Beneden, 1892
- Caligus dampieri Byrnes T., 1987
- Caligus dasyaticus Rangnekar, 1957
- Caligus debueni Stuardo & Fagetti, 1961
- Caligus deformis Brian, 1924
- Caligus diaphanus von Nordmann, 1832
- Caligus dicentrarchi Cabral & Raibaut, 1986
- Caligus dieuzeidei Brian, 1933
- Caligus digitatus Ho & Lin, 2003
- Caligus dubius T. Scott, 1894
- Caligus eleutheronemi Shen, 1957
- Caligus elongatus von Nordmann, 1832
- Caligus engraulidis Barnard, 1948
- Caligus enormis C. B. Wilson, 1913
- Caligus epidemicus Hewitt, 1971
- Caligus epinepheli Yamaguti, 1936
- Caligus equulae Ho & Lin, 2003
- Caligus evelynae Suárez-Morales, Camisotti & Martín, 2012
- Caligus eventilis Leigh-Sharpe, 1934
- Caligus fistulariae Yamaguti, 1936
- Caligus flexispina A. G. Lewis, 1964
- Caligus fortis Kabata, 1965
- Caligus fronsuganinus Shen, 1940
- Caligus fugu (Yamaguti, 1936)
- Caligus furcisetifer Redkar, Rangnekar & Murti, 1949
- Caligus glacialis Gadd, 1910
- Caligus glandifer Shiino, 1954
- Caligus grandiabdominalis Yamaguti, 1954
- Caligus guerini Guiart, 1913
- Caligus gurnardi Krøyer, 1863
- Caligus haemulonis Krøyer, 1863
- Caligus hamatus Heegaard, 1955
- Caligus hamruri Pillai, 1964
- Caligus hemiconiati Capart, 1941
- Caligus hobsoni Cressey, 1969
- Caligus hoplognathi Yamaguti & Yamasu, 1959
- Caligus hottentotus Barnard, 1957
- Caligus hyalinae Heegaard, 1966
- Caligus hyalinus Czerniavski, 1868
- Caligus ignotus Ho & Lin, 2010
- Caligus ilhoikimi Suárez-Morales & Gasca, 2016
- Caligus inanis Ho & Lin, 2007
- Caligus infestans Heller, 1865
- Caligus inopinatus Kabata, 1994
- Caligus irritans Heller, 1865
- Caligus isonyx Steenstrup & Lütken, 1861
- Caligus itacurussensis Luque & Cezar, 2000
- Caligus jawahari Hameed & Adamkutty, 1985
- Caligus kabatae Cressey, 1991
- Caligus kahawai Jones J.B., 1988
- Caligus kala A. G. Lewis, 1964
- Caligus kalumai A. G. Lewis, 1964
- Caligus kanagurta Pillai, 1961
- Caligus kapuhili A. G. Lewis, 1967
- Caligus keralensis Özak, Demirkale, Boxshall & Etyemez, 2013
- Caligus kirti Prabha & Pillai, 1986
- Caligus klawei Shiino, 1959
- Caligus kurochkini Kazachenko, 1975
- Caligus kuwaitensis Kabata & Tareen, 1984
- Caligus labracis T. Scott, 1902
- Caligus lacustris Steenstrup & Lütken, 1861
- Caligus lagocephali Pillai, 1961
- Caligus lalandei Barnard, 1948
- Caligus laminatus (Rangnekar, 1955)
- Caligus laticaudus Shiino, 1960
- Caligus latigenitalis Shiino, 1954
- Caligus latus Byrnes T., 1987
- Caligus lessonius Risso, 1826
- Caligus lethrinicola Boxshall & El-Rashidy, 2009
- Caligus lichiae Brian, 1906
- Caligus ligatus A. G. Lewis, 1964
- Caligus ligusticus Brian, 1906
- Caligus lini Ho & Cheng, 2016
- Caligus littoralis Luque & Cezar, 2000
- Caligus lobodes (C. B. Wilson, 1911)
- Caligus lolligunculae Capart, 1941
- Caligus longiabdominis Shiino, 1965
- Caligus longicaudatus Brady, 1899
- Caligus longicaudus Bassett-Smith, 1898
- Caligus longipedis Bassett-Smith, 1898
- Caligus longipes (Moon & Kim, 2012)
- Caligus longiramus Venmathi Maran, Ohtsuka & Jitchum, 2012
- Caligus longirostris Heegaard, 1962
- Caligus longispinosus (Heegaard, 1962)
- Caligus lunatus C. B. Wilson, 1924
- Caligus lutjani Ho, Lin & Chang, 2007
- Caligus macarovi Gusev, 1951
- Caligus macoloricola Hayes, Justine & Boxshall, 2012
- Caligus macrurus Heller, 1865
- Caligus malabaricus Pillai, 1961
- Caligus mebachii Marukawa, 1927
- Caligus minimus Otto, 1821
- Caligus mordax Leigh-Sharpe, 1934
- Caligus mortis Kensley, 1970
- Caligus mugilis Brian, 1935
- Caligus musaicus Cavaleiro, Santos & Ho, 2010
- Caligus mutabilis C. B. Wilson, 1905
- Caligus nanhaiensis Wu & Pan, 1997
- Caligus nengai Rangnekar, Rangnekar & Murti, 1953
- Caligus nibeae Shen, 1957
- Caligus nolani Longshaw, 1997
- Caligus novocaledonicus Kabata, 1968
- Caligus nuenonnae Andrews, Bott, Battaglene & Nowak, 2009
- Caligus oculicola Tang & Newbound, 2004
- Caligus ocyurus Cressey, 1991
- Caligus ogawai Venmathi Maran, Ohtsuka & Shang, 2012
- Caligus olsoni Pearse, 1953
- Caligus omissus Cressey & Cressey, 1980
- Caligus orientalis Gusev, 1951
- Caligus oviceps Shiino, 1952
- Caligus pagelli Delamare Deboutteville & Nunes-Ruivo, 1958
- Caligus pageti Russell, 1925
- Caligus pagri Capart, 1941
- Caligus pagrosomi Yamaguti, 1939
- Caligus pampi Ho & Lin, 2002
- Caligus parvilatus I. H. Kim, 1998
- Caligus parvus Bassett-Smith, 1898
- Caligus patulus C. B. Wilson, 1937
- Caligus pauliani Nuñes-Ruivo & Fourmanoir, 1956
- Caligus pectinatus Shiino, 1965
- Caligus pelagicus Kurian, 1955
- Caligus pelamydis Krøyer, 1863
- Caligus penrithi Kensley & Grindley, 1973
- Caligus pharaonis von Nordmann, 1832
- Caligus phipsoni Bassett-Smith, 1898
- Caligus placidus Dana, 1849
- Caligus planktonis Pillai, 1985
- Caligus platurus Kirtisinghe, 1964
- Caligus platytarsis Bassett-Smith, 1898
- Caligus polycanthi Gnanamuthu, 1950
- Caligus pomacentrus Cressey, 1991
- Caligus pomadasi Prabha & Pillai, 1986
- Caligus praecinctorius Hayes, Justine & Boxshall, 2012
- Caligus praetextus Bere, 1936
- Caligus priacanthi Pillai, 1961
- Caligus productus Dana, 1852
- Caligus pseudokalumai A. G. Lewis, 1968
- Caligus pseudoproductus Capart, 1959
- Caligus pterois Kurian, 1949
- Caligus punctatus Shiino, 1955
- Caligus quadratus Shiino, 1954
- Caligus quadrigenitalis Venmathi Maran, Ohtsuka & Shang, 2012
- Caligus randalli A. G. Lewis, 1964
- Caligus raniceps Heegaard, 1943
- Caligus rapax Milne Edwards, 1840
- Caligus regalis Leigh-Sharpe, 1930
- Caligus reniformis Prabha & Pillai, 1983
- Caligus robustus Bassett-Smith, 1898
- Caligus rogercresseyi Boxshall & Bravo, 2000
- Caligus rotundigenitalis Yü, 1933
- Caligus rufimaculatus C. B. Wilson, 1905
- Caligus saucius Dojiri, 1989
- Caligus savala Gnanamuthu, 1948
- Caligus schistonyx C. B. Wilson, 1905
- Caligus sciaenops Pearse, 1952
- Caligus sclerotinosus Roubal, Armitage & Rohde, 1983
- Caligus scribae Essafi, Cabral & Raibaut, 1984
- Caligus sensorius Heegaard, 1962
- Caligus sepetibensis Luque & Takemoto, 1996
- Caligus seriolae Yamaguti, 1936
- Caligus serratus Shiino, 1965
- Caligus sibogae Boxshall & Gurney, 1980
- Caligus sicarius Kabata, 1984
- Caligus similis Ho, I. H. Kim & Nagasawa, 2005
- Caligus solea Demirkale, Özak, Yanar & Boxshall, 2014
- Caligus spinosus Yamaguti, 1939
- Caligus stocki (Cressey & Cressey, 1990)
- Caligus stokesi Byrnes T., 1987
- Caligus stromatei Krøyer, 1863
- Caligus subparvus (Hameed, 1977)
- Caligus suffuscus C. B. Wilson, 1913
- Caligus tanago Yamaguti, 1939
- Caligus temnodontis Brian, 1924
- Caligus tenax Heller, 1865
- Caligus tenuicauda (Shiino, 1964)
- Caligus tenuifurcatus C. B. Wilson, 1937
- Caligus tenuis Fowler, 1912
- Caligus tenuis (van Beneden, 1852)
- Caligus teres C. B. Wilson, 1905
- Caligus tetrodontis Barnard, 1948
- Caligus thyrsitae Kazachenko, Korotaeva & Kurochkin, 1972
- Caligus torpedinis Heller, 1865
- Caligus trachynoti Heller, 1865
- Caligus triabdominalis Byrnes T., 1987
- Caligus triangularis Shiino, 1954
- Caligus tripedalis Heegaard, 1972
- Caligus truttae Giard, 1890
- Caligus tylosuri (Rangnekar, 1956)
- Caligus undulatus Shen & Li, 1959
- Caligus uniartus (Ho, I. H. Kim, Cruz & Nagasawa, 2004)
- Caligus ventrosetosus Pearse, 1952
- Caligus vexator Heller, 1865
- Caligus willungae Kabata, 1965
- Caligus wilsoni Delamare Deboutteville & Nunes-Ruivo, 1958
- Caligus xystercus Cressey, 1991
- Caligus zei Norman & T. Scott, 1906
- Caligus zylanica Hameed & Pillai, 1986
