= Kristian G. Andersen =

Danish evolutionary biologist

Kristian Andersen
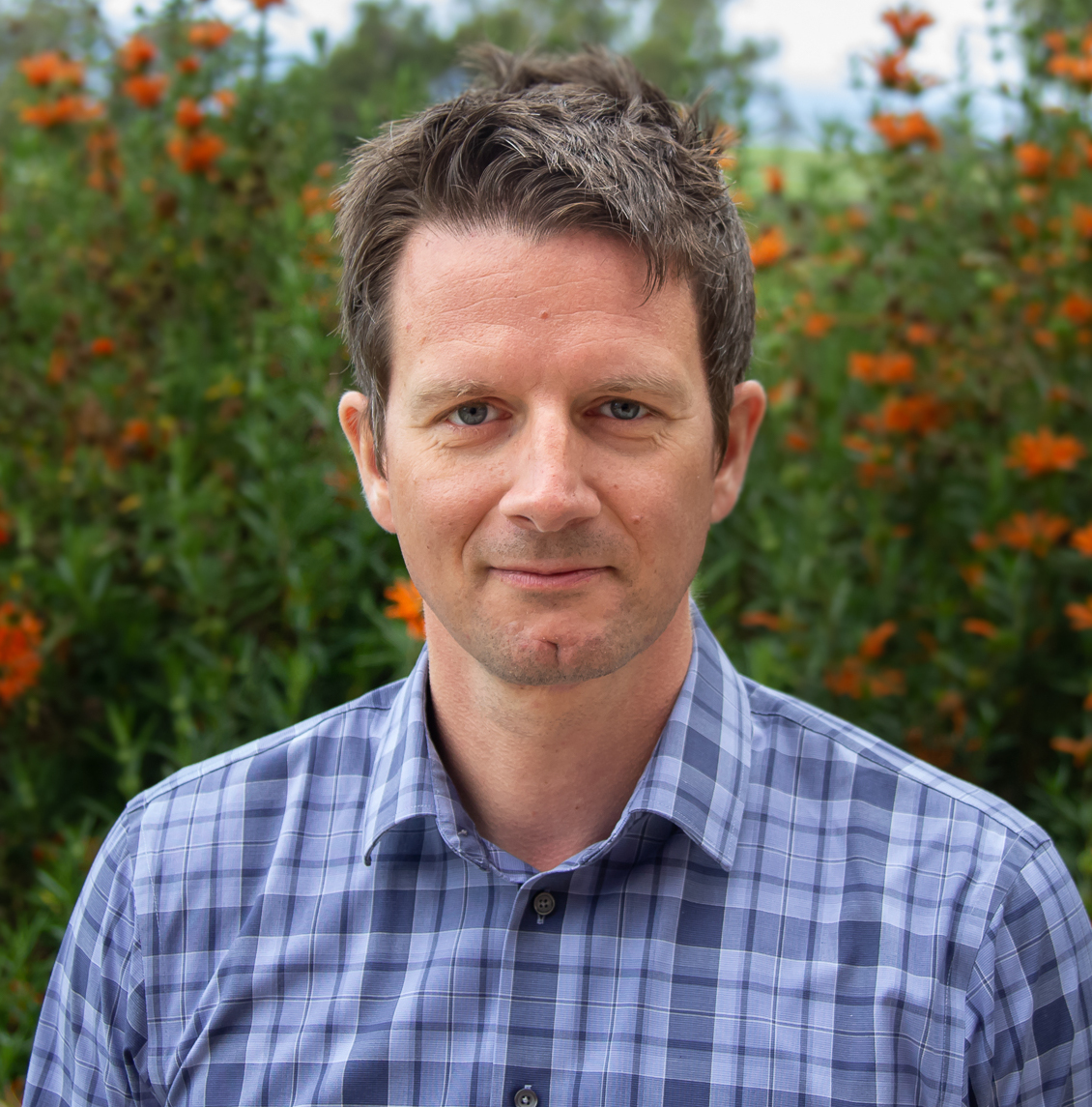
- Born: Denmark
- Education: Aarhus University (BSc); University of Cambridge (PhD)
- Known for: Co-author of The Proximal origin of SARS-CoV-2
- Scientific career
- Fields: Evolutionary biology
- Workplaces: Scripps Research Institute

Kristian G. Andersen is a Danish evolutionary biologist and professor in the Department of Immunology and Microbiology at Scripps Research in La Jolla, California.

== Education ==
Andersen obtained a BSc in molecular biology from Aarhus University in 2004, and a PhD in immunology from the University of Cambridge in 2009.

== Research ==
Andersen has studied the evolution and spread of several pathogens including SARS-CoV-2, Zika virus, Ebola virus, and Lassa virus. He conducts collaborative research through participating in international science coalitions including the West African Research Network for Infectious Diseases (WARN-ID).

Andersen's work provided insights into the emergence and transmission of Ebola virus during the Western African Ebola virus epidemic.

He also researched the 2015–16 Zika virus epidemic and gave comment on United States transmission through mosquitos.

=== COVID-19 ===
Early in the COVID-19 pandemic, Andersen and other scientists were consulted by the NIH and NIAID about the possibility of a lab leak. Andersen, in an email to Anthony Fauci in January 2020, told Fauci, the government's top infectious disease expert, that some features of the virus made him wonder whether it had been engineered, and noted that he and his colleagues were planning to investigate further by analyzing the virus's genome.

Andersen and his colleagues initially suspected that the virus could have escaped from a laboratory in Wuhan, China. After additional analyses and an accumulation of this scientific evidence, Andersen and his co-authors concluded that the hypothesis was unfounded. In a 2022 paper, Andersen concluded that animals sold in a market in Wuhan, China, were most likely to be the source of the virus.

Republicans in the US House of Representatives have interpreted private communications between Andersen and other virologists who authored a paper on the proximal origin of SARS-CoV-2 and Anthony Fauci as a sign of mutual efforts to downplay the probability of a lab-leak. Andersen was interviewed by the United States House Select Subcommittee on the Coronavirus Pandemic in June 2023 and testified before the Select Committee in July 2023 on specific discussions between him and other scientists in early 2020 (including a February 1, 2020 conference call) over the origin of SARS-CoV-2. In his testimony, Andersen rebutted accusations against him and his coauthors, saying that changing their minds after considering new data was "textbook science in action".

=== Software tools ===
Andersen’s lab has developed several open-source software packages for infectious disease analysis utilized by many public health labs, including Freyja, which is used to analyze wastewater data.

== Awards ==
In 2008, Andersen received the Max Perutz Student prize, which recognizes outstanding work prior to the award of a PhD. Andersen was recognized with a Ray Thomas Edwards Foundation Career Development Award and as a Pew Scholar in the Biomedical Sciences in 2016.
