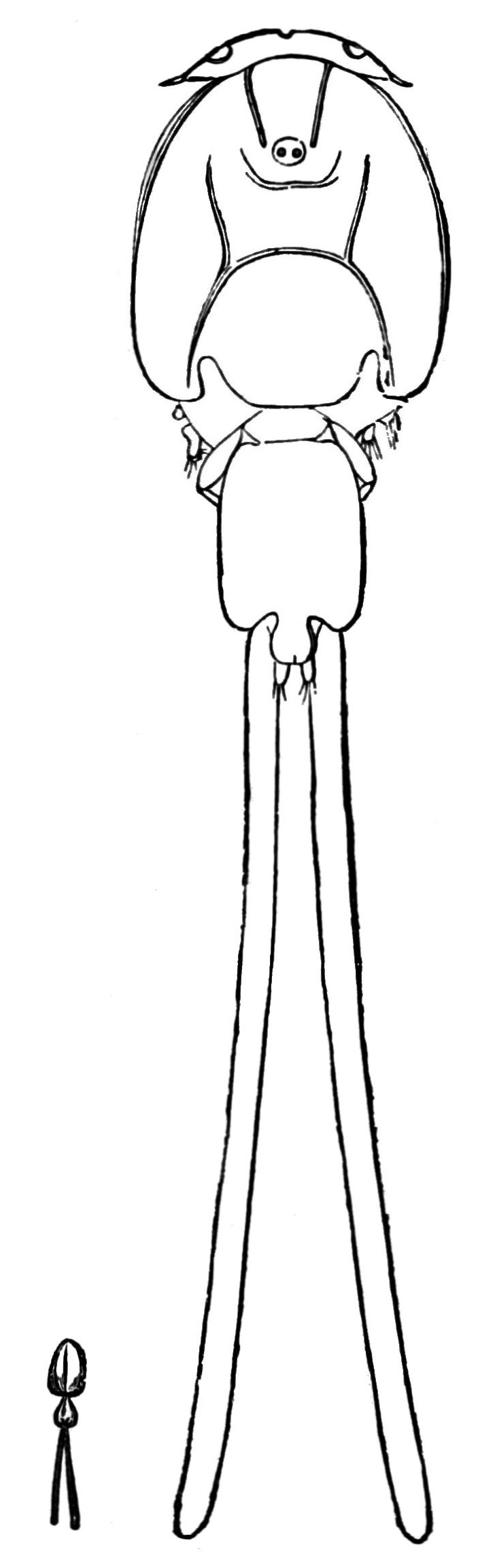
- Female Caligus curtus

Scientific classification
- Kingdom: Animalia
- Phylum: Arthropoda
- Class: Copepoda
- Order: Siphonostomatoida
- Family: Caligidae
- Genus: Caligus
- Species: C. curtus

Binomial name
- Caligus curtus O. F. Müller, 1785

Synonyms
- Caligulus elegans; Caligus elegans van Beneden, 1851

= Caligus curtus =

Species of crustacean

Caligus curtus is a sea louse species. It is a parasite of the Atlantic cod.
