= Geoffrey Boxshall =

British zoologist

Geoffrey Boxshall FRS
- Born: 13 June 1950 (age 76)
- Education: University of Leeds
- Scientific career
- Fields: Zoology
- Workplaces: Natural History Museum, London

Geoffrey Allan Boxshall FRS (born 13 June 1950) is a British zoologist and a merit researcher at the Natural History Museum, working primarily on copepods.

== Early life ==
Geoffrey Boxshall's parents were Jack Boxshall, a Canadian bank manager, and Sybil Boxshall (née Baker), a civil servant in the procurement department of the Ministry of Defence.

He was educated at Churcher's College, Petersfield from 1961 to 1968. He was vice captain of college 1967–1968 and captain of the Hockey XI 1968. He played rugby (open-side flanker) for Hampshire County in both the 1966–1967 and 1967–1968 seasons.

== Career ==
=== Field ===
Boxshall is a whole organism biologist with a particular interest in copepod crustaceans. These are ubiquitous in aquatic systems, but all radiated from a hyperbenthic origin in shallow marine waters. Multiple lineages of copepods colonised the open pelagic, fresh and subterranean waters, and colonised almost all other metazoan phyla as hosts as they adopted parasitism as a mode of life. The overarching aim of his research is to identify and understand the drivers generating the patterns of copepod biodiversity on the largest scales. His current focus is primarily on parasites: the repeated evolution of parasitism in copepods provides opportunities to examine the usage of different host taxa and to explore speciation patterns around major host colonisation or host switching events.

=== Academic achievements ===
Boxshall earned a First Class BSc in Zoology in 1971, and PhD in 1974, from the University of Leeds.

=== Awards ===
In 1986, Boxshall was awarded the Scientific Medal of the Zoological Society of London for outstanding contributions to zoology by a scientist under 40. In 1994, he became a fellow of The Royal Society, and in 1998, he was awarded the Crustacean Society's Award for Excellence in Research. In 2004, he received the Linnean Society medal for Zoology from the Linnean Society of London. In 2007, he was elected as honorary vice-president of the Marine Biological Association of the United Kingdom. He delivered the 24th Annual Plymouth Marine Science Lecture in 2010 on the topic "The magnitude of marine biodiversity: towards a quarter of a million species but not enough copepods!" In 2017, he was awarded the Achievement Award from the World Register of Marine Species (WoRMS).

=== Appointments ===
In 1974, Boxshall joined the Natural History Museum's Department of Zoology as a higher scientific officer. He progressed to senior scientific officer (1976), principal scientific officer (1980), senior principal scientific officer (1991), deputy chief scientific officer (merit researcher Band 2) (1997) and finally, to merit researcher Band 1 (2014) in the Department of Life Sciences. He retired in 2017.

Boxshall was the secretary of the Zoological Society of London from 2011 to 2021, and was vice-president of the Linnean Society Council from 2012 to 2013. He was a member of the Scientific Steering Committee of the World Register of Marine Species (WoRMS) from 2009 to 2013, and he served as chair of the committee from 2013 to 2016.

== Works ==
- Rony Huys, Geoffrey Allan Boxshall, Copepod evolution, Ray Society, 1991, ISBN 978-0-903874-21-2
- Geoffrey Allan Boxshall; Danielle Defaye, eds. (1993). Pathogens of wild and farmed fish: sea lice. CRC Press. ISBN 978-0-13-015504-7.
- C. D. Todd; M. S. Laverack; Geoffrey Allan Boxshall (1996). Coastal marine zooplankton: a practical manual for students. Cambridge University Press. ISBN 978-0-521-55533-3.
- Geoffrey Allan Boxshall, Sheila H. Halsey, An introduction to copepod diversity, Volume 2, Ray Society, 2004, ISBN 978-0-903874-31-1
- Lincoln, R. J. (25 June 1998). A Dictionary of Ecology, Evolution and Systematics. Cambridge: Cambridge University Press. ISBN 978-0-521-43842-1.
- Lincoln, Roger; Boxshall, Geoffrey (1987). The Cambridge Illustrated Dictionary of Natural History. Cambridge University Press. ISBN 9780521399418.

Professional and academic associations
Preceded by Paul H. Harvey	Secretary of the Zoological Society of London; 2011-2021	Incumbent
