= COVID-19 lab leak theory =

Proposed theory on the origins of COVID-19

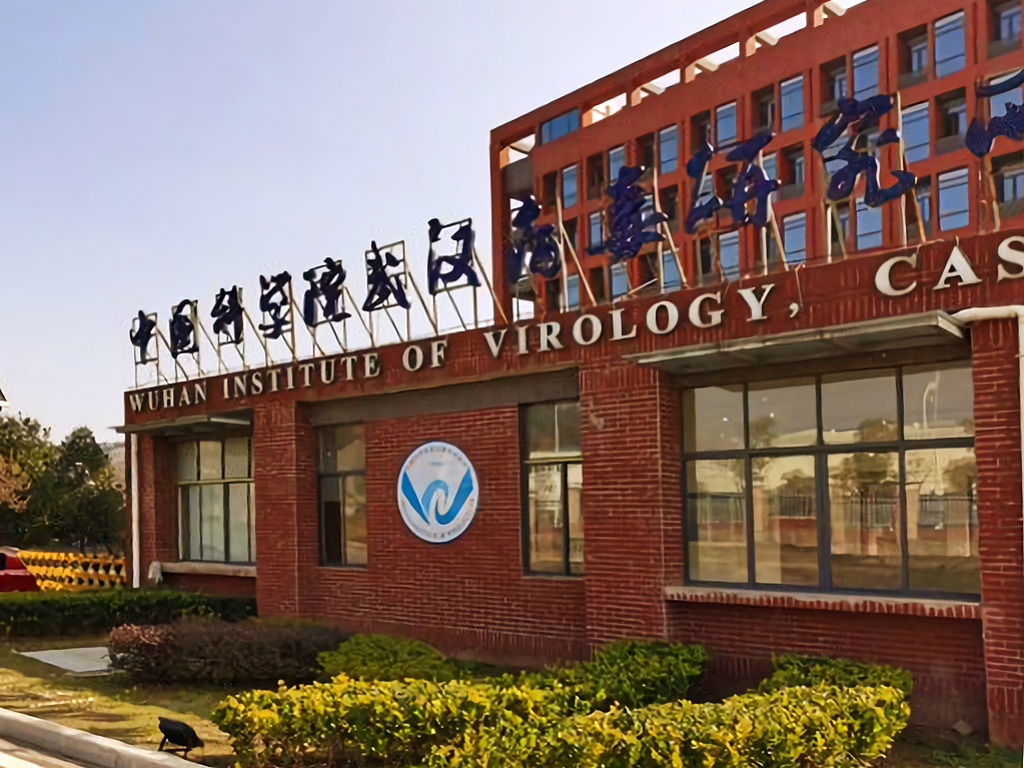
The Wuhan Institute of Virology in Wuhan, China

A highly controversial hypothesis holds that SARS-CoV-2, the virus responsible for the COVID-19 pandemic, originated from a laboratory. The scientific consensus is that the virus is not the result of genetic engineering; instead, most scientists believe it spread to human populations through natural zoonotic transmission from bats, similar to the SARS-CoV-1 and MERS-CoV outbreaks and other pandemics throughout human history. (Note: See: Pekar J (July 26, 2022). "The molecular epidemiology of multiple zoonotic origins of SARS-CoV-2". Science. 377 (6609): 960–966. Bibcode:2022Sci...377..960P. doi:10.1126/science.abp8337. PMC 9348752. PMID 35881005.; Jiang X, Wang R (August 25, 2022). "Wildlife trade is likely the source of SARS-CoV-2". Science. 377 (6609): 925–926. Bibcode:2022Sci...377..925J. doi:10.1126/science.add8384. PMID 36007033. S2CID 251843410. "Although the most probable reservoir animal for SARS-CoV-2 is Rhinolophus bats (2, 3), zoonotic spillovers likely involve an intermediate animal."; Holmes EC, Goldstein SA, Rasmussen AL, Robertson DL, Crits-Christoph A, et al. (September 2021). "The origins of SARS-CoV-2: A critical review". Cell (Review). 184 (19): 4848–4856. doi:10.1016/j.cell.2021.08.017. PMC 8373617. PMID 34480864. "As for the vast majority of human viruses, the most parsimonious explanation for the origin of SARS-CoV-2 is a zoonotic event...There is currently no evidence that SARS-CoV-2 has a laboratory origin. There is no evidence that any early cases had any connection to the WIV, in contrast to the clear epidemiological links to animal markets in Wuhan, nor evidence that the WIV possessed or worked on a progenitor of SARS-CoV-2 prior to the pandemic."; Bolsen T, Palm R, Kingsland JT (October 2020). "Framing the Origins of COVID-19". Science Communication. 42 (5): 562–585. doi:10.1177/1075547020953603. ISSN 1075-5470. PMC 7484600. PMID 38603006. S2CID 221614695. "Individuals may learn about the origins of COVID-19 through exposure to stories that communicate either what most scientists believe (i.e., zoonotic transmission) or through exposure to conspiratorial claims (e.g., the virus was created in a research laboratory in China)."; Robertson L (March 2, 2023). "Still No Determination on COVID-19 Origin". FactCheck.org. "most scientists suspect a zoonotic spillover in which the virus transferred from bats, or through an intermediate animal, to humans – the same way the SARS and MERS coronaviruses originated."; Gajilan AC (September 19, 2021). "Covid-19 origins: Why the search for the source is vital". CNN. "The zoonotic hypothesis hinges on the idea that the virus spilled over from animals to humans, either directly through a bat, or through some other intermediary animal. Most scientists say that this is the likely origin, given that 75% of all emerging diseases have jumped from animals into humans."; McDonald J (June 28, 2021). "Where Did COVID-19 Start? The Facts and Mysteries of Its Origin". NBC 5 Dallas-Fort Worth. "The default answer for most scientists has been that the virus, SARS-CoV-2, probably made the jump to humans from bats, if it was a direct spillover – or, more likely, through one or more intermediate mammals."; McKeever A (April 6, 2021). "We still don't know the origins of the coronavirus. Here are 4 scenarios". National Geographic. "The most controversial hypothesis for the origin of SARS-CoV-2 is also the one that most scientists agree is the least likely: that the virus somehow leaked out of a laboratory in Wuhan where researchers study bat coronaviruses."; Ball P. "Three years on, Covid lab-leak theories aren't going away. This is why". prospectmagazine.co.uk. "The leading theory now backed by most scientists is that the virus arose in wild bats and found its way into animals (perhaps via a pangolin or a civet cat) sold at the Huanan Seafood Wholesale Market in Wuhan."; Jackson C (September 21, 2020). "Controversy Aside, Why the Source of COVID-19 Matters". GEN – Genetic Engineering and Biotechnology News. "Most scientists studying the origins of COVID-19 have concluded that the SARS-CoV-2 virus probably evolved naturally and infected humans via incidental contact with a wild or domesticated animal."; McCarthy S (September 16, 2021). "Bat-human virus spillovers may be very common, study finds". South China Morning Post. "Questions have been raised about whether the virus could have leaked from a laboratory studying related viruses in Wuhan – a scenario most scientists...feel is less likely than a natural spillover."; Danner C (May 26, 2021). "Biden Joins the COVID Lab-Leak-Theory Debate". Intelligencer. "There continues to be no evidence at all for the conspiracy theory that SARS-CoV-2, the virus that causes COVID-19, was developed as some kind of bioweapon, and most scientists believe that the majority of available evidence indicates the virus jumped from animal to human.") Available evidence indicates that SARS-CoV-2 was originally harbored by bats and transmitted to humans through infected wild animals serving as intermediate hosts at the Huanan Seafood Market in Wuhan, Hubei, China, in December 2019. (Note: There were two landmark origins studies published side-by-side in Science in July 2022: Worobey et al. "The Huanan Seafood Wholesale Market in Wuhan was the early epicenter of the COVID-19 pandemic"; Pekar et al. "The molecular epidemiology of multiple zoonotic origins of SARS-CoV-2".) Several candidate animal species have been identified as potential intermediaries. (Note: Suggestions for intermediate animal hosts between horseshoe bats (Rhinolophus spp.) and humans have included: Common raccoon dog (Nyctereutes procyonoides); American mink (Neogale vison); Sunda pangolin (Manis javanica)) There is no evidence supporting laboratory involvement, no indication that the virus existed in any lab prior to the pandemic, and no record of suspicious biosecurity incidents.

Many scenarios proposed for a lab leak are characteristic of conspiracy theories. Central to many is a misplaced suspicion based on the proximity of the outbreak to the Wuhan Institute of Virology (WIV), where coronaviruses are studied. Most large Chinese cities have laboratories that study coronaviruses, and virus outbreaks are typically first noticed in large cities, so any outbreak in China is likely to occur near a laboratory studying coronaviruses. The idea of a leak at the WIV also gained support due to secrecy during the Chinese government's response. The lab leak theory and its weaponization by politicians have both leveraged and increased anti-Chinese sentiment. Scientists from WIV had previously collected virus samples from bats in the wild, and allegations that they also performed undisclosed work on such viruses are central to some versions of the idea. Some versions, particularly those alleging genome engineering, are based on misinformation or misrepresentations of scientific evidence.

The idea that the virus was released from a laboratory (accidentally or deliberately) appeared early in the pandemic. It gained popularity in the United States through promotion by conservative personalities in early 2020, fomenting tensions between the U.S. and China. Scientists and media outlets widely dismissed it as a conspiracy theory. The accidental leak idea had a resurgence in 2021. In March, the World Health Organization (WHO) published a report which deemed the possibility "extremely unlikely", though the WHO's director-general said the report's conclusions were not definitive. Subsequent plans for laboratory audits were rejected by China.

Most scientists are skeptical of the possibility of a laboratory origin, citing a lack of any supporting evidence for a lab leak and the abundant evidence supporting zoonosis. Some scientists agree a lab leak should be examined as part of ongoing investigations, though politicization remains a concern. In July 2022, two papers published in Science described novel epidemiological and genetic evidence that suggested the pandemic likely began at the Huanan Seafood Wholesale Market and did not come from a laboratory.

== Background ==
The principal hypothesis for the origin of COVID-19 is that it became infectious to humans through a natural spillover event (zoonosis), which is supported by available evidence. The origin of COVID-19 is not definitively known, and the theory it became infectious to humans through escape from a laboratory where it was being studied has not been definitively ruled out, however most scientists believe zoonosis is more likely, with a minority favoring the lab leak theory. Arguments used in support of a laboratory leak, as distinct from the lab leak hypothesis itself, have been described as characteristic of conspiratorial thinking. A 2024 survey of 168 experts, most of whom were epidemiologists and virologists, found on average they viewed zoonosis as 77% likely and a lab leak as 21% likely.

=== Zoonosis ===
Most new infectious diseases begin with a spillover event from animals. These spill overs occur spontaneously, either by contact with wildlife animals, which are the majority of cases, or with farmed animals. For example, the emergence of Nipah virus in Perak, Malaysia, and the 2002 outbreak of SARS-CoV-1 in Guangdong province, China, were natural zoonosis traced back to wildlife origin. COVID-19 is considered by scientists to be of probable animal origin. It has been classified as a zoonotic disease (naturally transmissible from animals to humans). Some scientists dispute this classification, since a natural reservoir has not been confirmed. The original source of viral transmission to humans remains unclear, as does whether the virus became pathogenic (capable of causing disease) before or after a spillover event.

Bats, a large reservoir of betacoronaviruses, are considered the most likely natural reservoir of SARS‑CoV‑2. Differences between bat coronaviruses and SARS‑CoV‑2 suggest that humans may have been infected via an intermediate host. Research into the natural reservoir of the virus that caused the 2002 SARS outbreak has resulted in the discovery of many SARS-like coronaviruses circulating in bats, most found in horseshoe bats. Analysis indicates that a virus collected from Rhinolophus affinis in a cave near the town of Tongguan in Yunnan province, designated RaTG13, has a 96% resemblance to SARS‑CoV‑2. The RaTG13 virus genome was the closest known sequence to SARS-CoV-2 until the discovery of BANAL-52 in horseshoe bats in Laos, but it is not its direct ancestor. Other closely related sequences were also identified in samples from local bat populations in Yunnan province. One such virus, RpYN06, shares 97% identity with SARS-CoV-2 in one large part of its genome, but 94% identity overall. Such "chunks" of very highly identical nucleic acids are often implicated as evidence of a common ancestor.

An ancestor of SARS-CoV-2 likely acquired "generalist" binding to several different species through adaptive evolution in bats and an intermediate host species. Estimates based on genomic sequences and contact tracing have placed the origin point of SARS-CoV-2 in humans as between mid-October and mid-November 2019. Some scientists (such as National Institute of Allergy and Infectious Diseases's former director Anthony Fauci and CIRAD's Roger Frutos) have suggested slow, undetected circulation in a smaller number of humans before a threshold event (such as replication in a larger number of hosts in a larger city like Wuhan) could explain an undetected adaption period.

The first known human infections from SARS‑CoV‑2 were discovered in Wuhan, China, in December 2019. Because many of the early infectees were workers at the Huanan Seafood Market, it was originally suggested that the virus might have originated from wild animals sold in the market, including civet cats, raccoon dogs, bats, or pangolins. Subsequent environmental analyses demonstrated the presence of SARS-CoV-2 in the market, with highest prevalence in areas of the market where animals known to be susceptible to SARS-CoV-2 infection were held. Early human cases clustered around the market, and included infections from two separate SARS-CoV-2 lineages. These two lineages demonstrated that the virus was actively infecting a population of animals in the market, and that sustained contact between those animals and humans had allowed for multiple viral transmissions into humans. All early cases of COVID-19 were later shown to be localized to the market and its immediate vicinity.

While other wild animals susceptible to SARS-CoV-2 infection are known to have been sold at Huanan, no bats or pangolins were sold at the market.

=== Wuhan Institute of Virology ===
The Wuhan Institute of Virology is located within the same city as focal point of the pandemic, Wuhan's Huanan Seafood Wholesale Market, and this shared location has made it easy for conspiracy theories to take root asserting that the laboratory must be the virus' origin. However virology labs are often built near potential outbreak areas. Proponents of the lab leak theory typically omit to mention that most large Chinese cities have coronavirus research laboratories. Virus outbreaks tend to begin in rural areas, but are first noticed in large cities. Stephan Lewandowsky and colleagues write that the location of the Institute near the outbreak site is "literally a coincidence" and using that coincidence as a priori evidence for a lab leak typifies a kind of conjunction fallacy. Furthermore, they observe that it is ironic lab leak proponents are keen to argue for the significance of proximity of laboratories to the outbreak, while ignoring the proximity of wet markets, which have long-been identified as potential origins for viral spillover events.

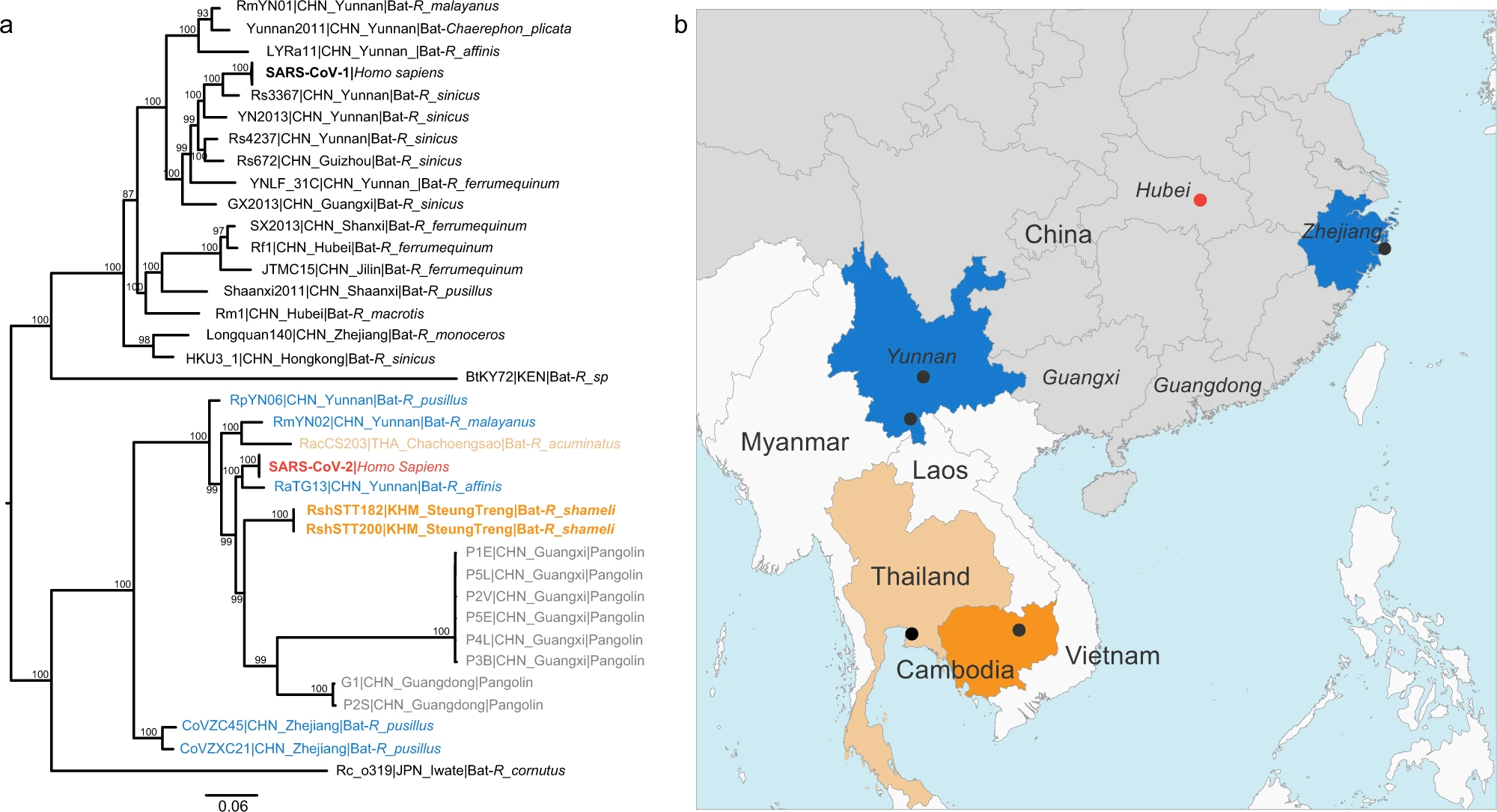
Phylogenetic tree of SARS-CoV-2 and closely related betacoronaviruses (left) and their geographic context (right)

The Wuhan Institute of Virology (WIV) had been conducting research on SARS-like bat coronaviruses since 2005, and was involved in 2015 experiments that some experts (such as molecular biologist Richard Ebright) have characterized as gain-of-function. Others (including epidemiologist Ralph Baric) have disputed the characterization, pointing out that the experiments in question (involving chimeric viruses) were not conducted at the WIV, but at UNC Chapel Hill, whose institutional biosafety committee assessed the experiments as not "gain-of-function". Baric did acknowledge the risks involved in such studies, writing, "Scientific review panels may deem similar studies building chimeric viruses based on circulating strains too risky to pursue ... The potential to prepare for and mitigate future outbreaks must be weighed against the risk of creating more dangerous pathogens."

The fact that the lab is in Wuhan, the city where the pandemic's early outbreak took place, and the fact that the research at WIV was being conducted under the less stringent biosafety levels (BSL) 2 and 3, has led to speculation that SARS-CoV-2 could have escaped from the Wuhan lab. Richard Ebright said one reason that lower-containment BSL-2 laboratories are sometimes used is the cost and inconvenience of high-containment facilities. Australian virologist Danielle Anderson, who was the last foreign scientist to visit the WIV before the pandemic, said the lab "worked in the same way as any other high-containment lab". She also said it had "strict safety protocols". The Huanan Seafood Market may have only served as a jumping off point for a virus that was already circulating in Wuhan, facilitating rapid expansion of the outbreak.

=== Prior lab leak incidents and conspiracy theories ===
Laboratory leak incidents have occurred in the past. A Soviet research facility in 1979 leaked anthrax and at least 68 people died. The 2007 foot-and-mouth outbreak in the UK was caused by a leaky pipe at a high-security laboratory. The SARS virus escaped at least once, and probably twice, from a high-level biocontainment laboratory in China.

Benign exposures to pathogens (which do not result in an infection) are probably under-reported, given the negative consequences of such events on the reputation of a host institution and low risk for widespread epidemics. Epidemiologist Marc Lipsitch and Richard Ebright have said that the risk of laboratory-acquired infection (especially with modified pathogens) is greater than widely believed.

No epidemic has ever been caused by the leak of a novel virus. The only incident of a lab-acquired infection leading to an epidemic is the 1977 Russian flu which was probably caused by a leaked strain of H1N1 that had circulated naturally until the 1950s.

Previous novel disease outbreaks, such as AIDS, H1N1/09, SARS, and Ebola have been the subject of conspiracy theories and allegations that the causative agent was created in or escaped from a laboratory. Each of these is now understood to have a natural origin.

=== Psychological and social factors ===
Public interest in the lab leak theory has in part been attributed to secrecy during the Chinese government's response to the outbreak, which was characterized by a reluctance to share data and cooperate with international investigations.

Survey work on the public in the United States has found that identity politics and racial resentment are factors informing overconfident belief in the lab leak theory and COVID-19 misinformation in general. The researchers propose that this shows how such beliefs are resistant to refutation because they are not subject only to evidence, but to ingrained attitudes and notions of self.

On social media the idea that COVID was a Chinese biological weapon has become widespread, and accords with rhetoric about how a yellow peril threatens white people. Science historian Fred Cooper and colleagues write that in the United Kingdom, attitudes to the Chinese have long been tainted by xenophobic stereotypes. Cooper draws a parallel between the Wuhan lab leak narrative, and the machinations of fictional supervillain Fu Manchu, who is "expert in the deadly application of animal and biological agents" and who has been depicted on television shows as threatening the West with lethal diseases.

== Conjecture ==
The lab leak theory is not a single discrete proposed scenario, but a collection of various proposed conjectures on a spectrum with, at one end, a careless accident from legitimate research; at the other, the engineering and release of a Chinese biological weapon. While the proposed narratives are theoretically subject to evidence-based investigation, it is not clear that any can be sufficiently falsified to placate lab leak supporters, as they are based on pseudoscientific and conspiratorial thinking.

There is no evidence that any laboratory had samples of SARS-CoV-2, or a plausible ancestor virus, prior to the start of the COVID-19 pandemic.

Various sources have hypothesised that SARS-CoV-2 could have leaked from the Wuhan Institute of Virology or another laboratory in Wuhan, such as the Wuhan Center for Disease Control. The theories vary on whether this was an intentional act or an accident. Theories also vary on whether the virus was modified by human activity prior to being released. By January 2020 some lab leak proponents were promoting a narrative with conspiracist components; such narratives were often supported using "racist tropes that suggest that epidemiological, genetic, or other scientific data had been purposefully withheld or altered to obscure the origin of the virus". Physician and science writer David Gorski refers to "the blatant anti-Chinese racism and xenophobia behind lab leak, whose proponents often ascribe a nefarious coverup to the Chinese government". Gorski later stated the lab leak hypothesis hasn't "stood up to scientific scrutiny". The use of xenophobic rhetoric also caused a rise in anti-Chinese sentiment.

=== Origins ===
In the early days of the COVID-19 pandemic, speculation about a laboratory leak was confined to conspiracy-minded portions of the internet, including 4Chan and Infowars, but the ideas began to get wider traction after accusations about a "Chinese bioweapon" were originally published by Great Game India and then republished by the Red State Watch and Zero Hedge web sites. From there, the idea gained media traction and was championed by American conservative political figures.

The idea split into variants, including one that proposed Asian people were immune to COVID, or that the Chinese had a secret vaccine standing by for use. Some proposed that the Chinese government and World Health Organization were operating together in a conspiracy. The American president of the time, Donald Trump, used anti-Chinese rhetoric (such as "Kung flu") to feed the idea, and said in an April 2020 news conference that he had documents supporting the idea that SARS-CoV-2 had come from the Wuhan Institute of Virology.

In reaction to this politicized environment, most mainstream science and media sources assumed that the lab leak idea was no more than racially fuelled propaganda, and by the summer of 2020 the idea was largely dismissed, until the next American president, Joe Biden, ordered an investigation into COVID's origins in 2021.

=== Accidental release of a natural virus ===
Some have hypothesised the virus arose in humans from an accidental infection of laboratory workers by contact with a sample extracted from a wild animal or by direct contact with a captive animal or its respiratory droplets or feces.

Former CDC director Robert R. Redfield said in March 2021 that in his opinion the most likely cause of the virus was a laboratory escape, which "doesn't imply any intentionality", and that as a virologist, he did not believe it made "biological sense" for the virus to be so "efficient in human to human transmission" from the early outbreak. The fact that scientists have not been successful in finding an intermediate host that picked up the virus from bats and passed it to humans is seen by some as evidence that supports a lab leak, according to The Guardian.

University of Utah virologist Stephen Goldstein has criticized the scientific basis of Redfield's comments, saying that since SARS-CoV-2's spike protein is very effective at jumping between hosts, one shouldn't be surprised that it transmits efficiently among humans. Goldstein said "If a human virus [such as SARS-CoV2] can transmit among mink, there's no basis to assume a bat virus [also SARS-CoV2] can't transmit among humans. Us humans may think we're very special – but to a virus we are just another mammalian host."

In June 2024, Deborah Birx, Donald Trump's Coronavirus Response Coordinator, in response to CNN's Kassie Hunt asking if there were efforts to discredit the lab leak theory, said "I do think it happened. If you look at what people said about Bob Redfield and how they disparaged him as a scientist because he wanted to bring forward the lab leak potential." She added: "And I think the reason [Redfield] felt he needed to bring it forward to push, was to push against this, 'it had to be this way.' Because we didn't know, and we knew we would never know."

==== WHO assessment ====
The WHO-convened Global Study of Origins of SARS-CoV-2, written by a joint team of Chinese and international scientists and published in March 2021, assessed introduction through a laboratory incident to be "extremely unlikely" and not supported by any available evidence, although the report stated that this possibility could not be wholly ruled out without further evidence. The report stated that human spillover via an intermediate animal host was the most likely explanation, with direct spillover from bats next most likely. Introduction through the food supply chain and the Huanan Seafood Market was considered less likely.

A small group of researchers said that they would not trust the report's conclusions because it was overseen by the Chinese government, and some observers felt the WHO's statement was premature. Other scientists found the report convincing, and said there was no evidence of a laboratory origin for the virus.

WHO Director-General Tedros Adhanom stated that the team had experienced difficulty accessing raw data on early COVID-19 cases and that the least likely hypothesis, a lab leak, required additional investigation because "further data and studies will be needed to reach more robust conclusions". The leader of the WHO investigatory team, Peter Ben Embarek, said "An employee of the lab gets infected while working in a bat cave collecting samples. Such a scenario, while being a lab leak, would also fit our first hypothesis of direct transmission of the virus from bat to human."

The United States, European Union, and 13 other countries criticized the WHO-convened study, calling for transparency from the Chinese government and access to the raw data and original samples. Chinese officials described these criticisms as "an attempt to politicise the study". Scientists involved in the WHO report, including Liang Wannian, John Watson, and disease ecologist Peter Daszak, objected to the criticism, and said that the report was an example of the collaboration and dialogue required to successfully continue investigations into the matter. Embarek later claimed in August 2021 that the WHO was put under pressure by Chinese scientists to dismiss the lab leak theory in its report.

On July 15, 2021, WHO Director-General Tedros Adhanom Ghebreyesus said that the COVID-19 lab leak theory had been prematurely discarded by the WHO, following his earlier statements that a potential leak requires "further investigation, potentially with additional missions involving specialist experts". He proposed a second phase of WHO investigation, which he said should take a closer look at the lab leak idea, and asked the Chinese government to be "transparent" and release relevant data. Later on July 17, Tedros called for "audits of relevant laboratories and research institutions" in the area of the initial COVID-19 cases. China's government refused saying it showed "disrespect" and "arrogance towards science". The United States criticised China's position on the follow-up origin probe as "irresponsible" and "dangerous".

In June 2022, the WHO's Scientific Advisory Group for Origins of Novel Pathogens (SAGO) published a preliminary report urged a deeper investigation into the possibility of a laboratory leak. The SAGO chair said in a press conference that "the strongest evidence is still around a zoonotic transmission". The AP described the report as a "sharp reversal" of the WHO's previous assessment, and Science.org described reactions from academics as mixed.

In early 2023, the WHO abandoned its original investigation into the origin of SARS-CoV-2, delegating work to its standing committee, SAGO, with plans to establish a COVID-19 timeline, search for similar viruses, and conduct further laboratory studies on animals and human samples. In 2025, SAGO suggested that a zoonotic origin has the "weight of available evidence" and emphasized that the origin remains unresolved without additional primary data, including early patient records and sequences, detailed wildlife supply-chain documentation, and laboratory biosafety and health records from Wuhan institutions.

==== Mojiang copper mine ====
Members of DRASTIC, a collection of internet activists advocating for the lab leak theory, have raised concerns over a respiratory outbreak that happened in the spring of 2012 near an abandoned copper mine in China. Virologist Shi Zhengli's Center for Emerging Infectious Diseases at the Wuhan Institute of Virology, investigated the case, collecting a sample of viral RNA and named it RaBtCoV/4991. Later, Shi's group published a paper about a virus named RaTG13 in Nature in February 2020. Via sequence comparisons, it became clear that RaBtCoV/4991 and RaTG13 were likely the same virus. Shi has said that the renaming was done to reflect the origin location and year of the virus.

Some proponents, including journalist Nicholas Wade and pseudonymous DRASTIC member "TheSeeker268", argued that the renaming was an attempt to obscure the origins of the virus and hide how it could be related to a laboratory origin of the related SARS-CoV-2 virus. Scientists have said that RaTG-13 is too distantly related to be connected to the pandemic's origins, and could not be altered in a laboratory to create SARS-CoV-2. Nature later published an addendum to the 2020 RaTG13 paper addressing any possible link to the mine, in which Shi says that the virus was collected there, but that it was very likely not the cause of the miners' illnesses. According to the addendum, laboratory tests conducted on the workers' serum were negative, and "no antibodies to a SARS-like coronavirus had been found."

=== Accidental release of a genetically modified virus ===
There is a scientific consensus that SARS-CoV-2 is not the result of genetic engineering. Nevertheless, one conspiracy theory spread in support a laboratory origin suggests SARS-CoV-2 was developed for gain-of-function research on coronaviruses. The exact meaning of "gain of function" is disputed among experts. According to emailed statements by Shi Zhengli, her lab has not conducted any unpublished gain-of-function experiments on coronaviruses, and all WIV staff and students tested negative for the virus in the early days of the pandemic.

==== Furin cleavage site ====
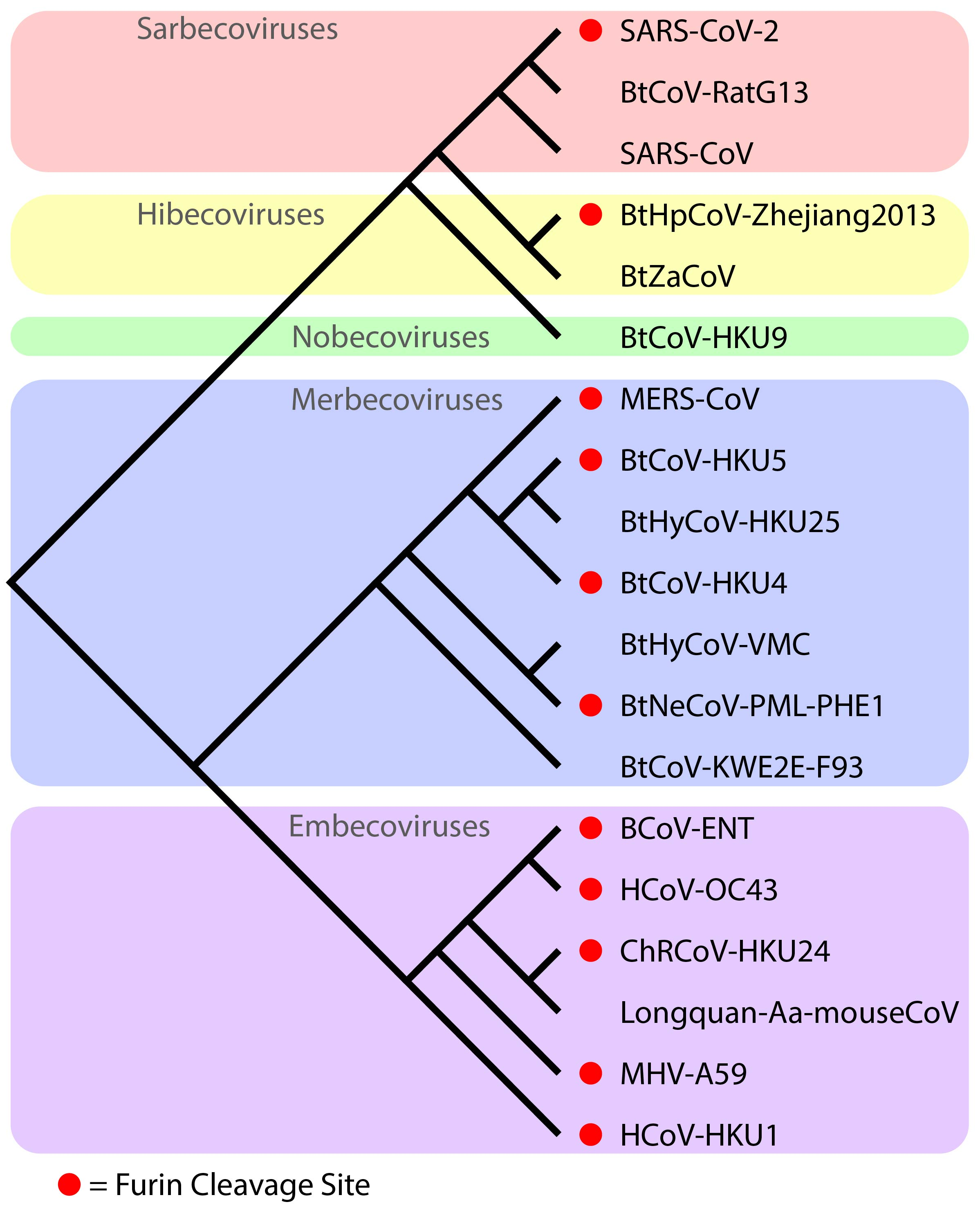
Tree showing betacoronaviruses lineages with known furin cleavage sites (noted with red circles). Adapted from Wu et al.

One strand of argumentation in favor of a lab leak rests on the premise that there is something "unnatural" about the genetic makeup of the SARS-CoV-2 virus, showing it must have been created by genetic engineering. Some claims of bioengineering focus on the presence of two sequential cytosine-guanine-guanine (CGG) codons in the virus' RNA, more precisely in the crucial furin cleavage site. The CGG codon is one of several codons that translates into an arginine amino acid, and it is the least common arginine codon in human pathogenic betacoronaviruses. Partially, this lack of CGG codons in human pathogenic coronaviruses is due to natural selection; B-cells in the human body recognize areas on virus genomes where C and G are next to each other (so-called CpG islands). The CGG codon makes up 5% of the arginine codons in the SARS-CoV-1 genome, and it makes up 3% of the arginine codons in the SARS-CoV-2 genome.

Proponents of an engineered virus, including Nicholas Wade, argue that the low chance of two CGG codons in a row appearing in nature, combined with the common usage of such codons for arginine in genetic engineering work, is evidence for a laboratory experiment. This has been rejected by scientists, who note that the CGG codon is also present (and even more frequent) in other coronaviruses, including MERS-CoV, and that a codon being rare does not mean it cannot be present naturally. If the CGG codon had been engineered into the virus, it should have mutated out of the virus as it circulated in humans in the wild over several years, but the opposite has occurred. In fact, the presence of the furin cleavage site, which is responsible for a significant increase in transmissibility, largely outweighs any disadvantageous immune responses from B-cells triggered by the genetic sequences which code for it.

Another source of speculation is the mere presence of the furin cleavage site. It is absent in the closest known relatives of SARS-CoV-2 (but present in other betacoronaviruses, e.g., BtHpCoV-ZJ13). This anomaly is most probably the result of recombination, and is further unsurprising since the genetic lineage of these viruses has not been adequately explored, sampled, or sequenced. A common occurrence among other coronaviruses (including MERS-CoV, HCoV-OC43, HCoV-HKU1, and appearing in near-identical fashion in HKU9-1), the site is preceded by short palindromic sequences suggestive of natural recombination caused by simple evolutionary mechanisms. Additionally, the suboptimal configuration and poor targeting of the cleavage site for humans or mice when compared with known examples (such as HCoV-OC43 or HCoV-HKU1), along with the complex and onerous molecular biology work this would have required, is inconsistent with what would be expected from an engineered virus.

==== Political and government opinion ====
The situation reignited a debate over gain-of-function research, although the intense political rhetoric surrounding the issue has threatened to sideline serious inquiry over policy in this domain. Researchers have said the politicization of the debate is making the process more difficult, and that words are often twisted to become "fodder for conspiracy theories". The idea of an experiment conducted in 2015 on SARS-like coronaviruses being the source of the pandemic was reported in British tabloids early in the pandemic. Virologist Angela Rasmussen writes that this is unlikely, due to the intense scrutiny and government oversight gain-of-function research is subject to, and that it is improbable that research on hard-to-obtain coronaviruses could occur under the radar.

Kentucky Senator Rand Paul alleged that the US National Institutes of Health (NIH) had been funding gain-of-function research in Wuhan, accusing researchers including epidemiologist Ralph Baric of creating "super-viruses". Both Fauci and NIH Director Francis Collins denied that the US government supported such research. Baric likewise rejected Paul's allegations, saying his lab's research into cross-species transmission of bat coronaviruses did not qualify as gain-of-function. While a 2017 study of chimeric bat coronaviruses at the WIV listed NIH as a sponsor, NIH funding was only related to sample collection. A Washington Post fact-checker commented that "EcoHealth funding was not related to the experiments, but the collection of samples", and that "statements about Baric's research appear overblown". In October 2021, a spokesman for the NIH acknowledged that the EcoHealth Alliance had provided new data demonstrating that in a mouse experiment, a coronavirus had caused more weight loss than expected. This was described as an unexpected consequence of the research, and not its intended outcome or a component of the original funding proposal. Importantly, the NIH spokesman said this finding was provided in a late progress report, and was not available before prior statements about experiments at the WIV.

An August 2021 interim report authored by the minority staff of the Republican members of the US House Foreign Affairs Committee said that a laboratory leak origin for SARS-CoV-2 was more likely than a natural one. The report alleged that SARS-CoV-2 emerged in humans as a result of gain-of-function research made on the RaTG13 virus, collected in a cave in Yunnan province in 2012, which was afterwards accidentally released some time before September 12, 2019, when the database of the Wuhan Institute of Virology went offline. The August 2021 report relies mostly on existing public evidence, combined with internal documents from the CCP from before and during the early days of the pandemic.

The interim report was published coinciding with a joint investigation from ProPublica and Vanity Fair. Immediately following its publication, the report was heavily criticized by experts in diplomacy and the Chinese language for mistranslations and misinterpretations of Chinese documents. Molecular biologist and lab leak theory proponent Richard Ebright criticized the report for packaging pre-existing and previously examined evidence as new information. Evolutionary biologist Michael Worobey commented that the document seemed to be either "a cynical effort to try to win Republican votes" in the November 2022 midterm elections, or "a bunch of staffers with no ability to understand the science who stumbled across a bunch of misinformation and disinformation-filled tweets." Virologist Angela Rasmussen described the report as "an embarrassingly bad use of taxpayer money and resources." The final version of the report was released on April 18, 2023. The final version reiterated the interim position that the pandemic began in a laboratory incident in the fall of 2019, based on what it called a "preponderance of circumstantial evidence".

=== Fringe views on genetic engineering ===
The earliest known recorded mention of any type of lab leak theory appeared in the form of a tweet published on January 5, 2020, from a Hong Kong user named @GarboHK, insinuating that the Chinese government had created a new virus and intentionally released it. Similar ideas were later formalized in a preprint posted on BioRxiv on January 31, 2020, by researchers at the Indian Institute of Technology, claiming to find similarities between the new coronavirus' genome and that of HIV. The paper was quickly retracted due to irregularities in the researchers' "technical approach and...interpretation of the results". This claim was promoted by Luc Montagnier, a controversial French virologist and Nobel laureate, who contended that SARS-CoV-2 might have been created during research on a HIV/AIDS vaccine. Bioinformatics analyses show that the common sequences are short, that their similarity is insufficient to support the hypothesis of common origin, and that the identified sequences were independent insertions which occurred at varied points during the evolution of coronaviruses.

Further claims were promulgated by several anti-vaccine activists, such as Judy Mikovits and James Lyons-Weiler, who claimed that SARS-CoV-2 was created in a laboratory, with Mikovits going further and stating that the virus was both deliberately engineered and deliberately released. Weiler's analysis, where he argued that a long sequence in the middle of the spike protein of the virus was not found in other coronaviruses and was evidence for laboratory recombination, was dismissed by scientists, who found that the sequence in question was also found in many other coronaviruses, suggesting that it was "widely spread" in nature.

Chinese researcher Li-Meng Yan was an early proponent of deliberate genetic engineering, releasing widely criticised preprint papers in favor of the lab leak theory in the spring of 2020. After she released her preprints, political operatives (including former Breitbart News publisher and White House chief strategist Steve Bannon and Guo Wengui) arranged for Yan to flee to the United States in the summer of 2020 to engage in a speaking tour on right-wing media outlets, as a method of distracting from the Trump administration's handling of the COVID-19 pandemic. According to scientific reviewers from the Johns Hopkins Center for Health Security, Yan's paper offered "contradictory and inaccurate information that does not support their argument," while reviewers from MIT Press's Rapid Reviews: COVID-19 criticised her preprints as not demonstrating "sufficient scientific evidence to support [their] claims."

In September 2022, a panel assembled by The Lancet published a wide-ranging report on the pandemic. The report, overseen by The Lancet COVID-19 Commission chair Jeffrey Sachs and distinct from the journal's February 2020 letter on COVID-19's origins, included commentary on the virus origin. It suggested that the virus may have originated from an American laboratory, a notion long-promoted by Sachs, including on the podcast of conspiracy theorist Robert F. Kennedy Jr. Reacting to this, virologist Angela Rasmussen commented that this may have been "one of The Lancet's most shameful moments regarding its role as a steward and leader in communicating crucial findings about science and medicine". Virologist David Robertson said the suggestion of US laboratory involvement was "wild speculation" and that "it's really disappointing to see such a potentially influential report contributing to further misinformation on such an important topic".

In popular media, a 2018 grant application for a proposed virus manipulation and bat vaccination experiment called “DEFUSE” attracted coverage, as possible evidence for dangerous work being done in Wuhan which could have created SARS-CoV-2. However the grant application was not successful, and the proposed experiment does not describe procedures that plausibly could have led to SARS-CoV-2.

=== Deliberate release ===
Historian of science Naomi Oreskes says that she does not know of any credible scientists who support the view that the virus was released deliberately, while the version proposing the virus may have escaped accidentally is more plausible.

In the United States, Senator Marsha Blackburn proposed a bill that would allow people to lodge lawsuits against China for use of a "biological weapon", stating that "China has a 5,000-year history of cheating and stealing. Some things will never change".

== Political, academic and media attention ==
=== Media reports ===
The first media reports suggesting a SARS-CoV-2 lab leak appeared in the Daily Mail and The Washington Times in late January 2020. In a January 31, 2020, interview with Science, Professor Richard Ebright said there was a possibility that SARS-CoV-2 entered humans through a laboratory accident in Wuhan, and that all data on the genome sequence and properties of the virus were "consistent with entry into the human population as either a natural accident or a laboratory accident". A February 5, 2021, report from Caixin described these reports as rumors originating from two sources: a preprint paper by an Indian scholar posted to bioRxiv that was later withdrawn, and a BBC China report. On February 8, 2023, the acting director of the US National Institutes of Health (NIH) testified before a Republican-led House committee that the viruses studied in the Wuhan lab "bear no relationship" to SARS-CoV-2 and that suggesting equivalency would be akin to "saying that a human is equivalent to a cow".

In early 2021, the hypothesis returned to popular debate due to renewed media discussion. The renewed interest was prompted by two events. First, an article published in May by The Wall Street Journal reported that lab workers at the Wuhan Institute of Virology fell ill with COVID-19-like symptoms in November 2019. The report was based on off-the-record briefings with intelligence officials. The cases would precede official reports from the Chinese government stating the first known cases were in December 2019, although unpublished government data suggested the earliest cases were detected in mid-November. The Guardian stated that the WSJ article did little to confirm, in terms of good, quality evidence, the possibility of a lab leak; a declassified report from the National Intelligence Council likewise said that the fact the researchers were hospitalized was unrelated to the origins of the outbreak. Second, it was shown that Peter Daszak, the key organiser of the February 2020 statement in The Lancet, did not disclose connections to the Wuhan Institute of Virology. An addendum was later published by The Lancet, in which Daszak listed his previous cooperation with Chinese researchers.

After the publication of the WHO-convened report, politicians, talk show hosts, journalists, and some scientists advanced claims that SARS-CoV-2 may have come from the WIV. DRASTIC also contributed to its promotion, particularly via Twitter. In July 2021, a Harvard–Politico survey indicated that 52 percent of Americans believed that COVID-19 originated from a lab leak, while 28 percent believed that COVID-19 originated from an infected animal in nature. By March 2023, the percentage of Americans believing in lab origin had doubled (from 30% to 60%) since 3 years earlier, and the percentage of Americans believing in natural origins had halved (from 40% to 20%).

Science educationalist Heslley Machado Silva describes the idea of a China-produced virus as part of "xenophobic social network crusade" akin to a far-fetched movie scenario, which has nevertheless garnered many millions of internet adherents. Silva raises a plea for the pandemic to be a time for humanity to become "better and not an opportunity to foment hatred".

After May 2021, some media organizations softened previous language that described the laboratory leak theory as "debunked" or a "conspiracy theory". However, the prevailing scientific view remained that while an accidental leak was possible, it was highly unlikely.

A group of scientists called the "Paris group" in 2021 advocated for an inquiry into the role of scientific and medical journals which they claimed to have rebuffed dozens of articles about the possibility of the lab leak hypothesis. Some commentators such as science journalist Jane Qiu and academic Zeynep Tufekci have criticized the immediate framing of the lab leak theory as a conspiracy theory.

=== China–US relations ===
The origin of COVID-19 became a source of friction in China–United States relations. The lab leak theory was promulgated in early 2020 by United States politicians and media, particularly US president Donald Trump, other prominent Republicans, and conservative media (such as Fox News pundit Tucker Carlson, and Steve Bannon). Trump had also referred to the virus as "kung flu", and the administration also expressed the intention to sanction China. In April 2020, Trump claimed to have evidence for the lab leak theory, but refused to produce it when requested. At that time, the media did not distinguish between the accidental lab leak of a natural virus and bio-weapon origin conspiracy theories. In online discussions, various theories – including the lab leak theory – were combined to form larger, baseless conspiracy plots.

In May 2020, Fox News host Tucker Carlson accused Fauci of having "funded the creation of COVID" through gain-of-function research at the Wuhan Institute of Virology (WIV). Citing an essay by science writer Nicholas Wade, Carlson alleged that Fauci had directed research to make bat viruses more infectious to humans. Facebook enacted a policy to remove discussion of the lab leak theory as misinformation; it lifted the ban a year later, in May 2021.

A BBC China report stated that on February 14, Chinese president Xi Jinping proposed for biosafety to be incorporated into law; the following day, new measures were introduced to "strengthen the management of laboratories", especially those working with viruses. In April 2020, The Guardian reported that China had taken steps to tightly regulate domestic research into the source of the outbreak in an attempt to control the narrative surrounding its origins and encourage speculation that the virus started outside the country. In May 2020, Chinese state media carried statements by scientists countering claims that the seafood market and Institute of Virology were possible origin sites, including comments by George Gao, director of the Chinese Center for Disease Control and Prevention.

In the United States, anti-China misinformation spread on social media, including baseless bio-weapon claims, fueled aggressive rhetoric towards people of Asian ancestry, and the bullying of scientists. Some scientists were worried their words would be misconstrued and used to support racist rhetoric. A letter published in Science by virologist Jesse Bloom and others, outlined the uncertain origin of SARS-CoV-2 and proved an impetus for misinformation. The letter was criticized by virologists and public health experts, who said that a "hostile" and "divisive" focus on the WIV was unsupported by evidence, was impeding inquiries into legitimate concerns about China's pandemic response and transparency by combining them with speculative and meritless argument, and would cause Chinese scientists and authorities to share less rather than more data.

Some members of the Chinese government have promoted a counter-conspiracy theory claiming that SARS‑CoV‑2 originated in the U.S. military installation at Fort Detrick. This theory has little support. Chinese demands to investigate U.S. laboratories are thought to be a distracting technique to push focus away from Wuhan.

=== Attacks on scientists ===
A consistent feature of all varieties of the lab leak theory is that they direct blame at scientists. Scientists are accused of engineering the virus or negligently allowing it to escape their laboratories, and then conspiring to cover-up their misdeeds.

Two Rutgers University faculty members – Richard Ebright and Bryce Nickels – have been prominent social media posters advancing the lab leak position, and have continually attacked COVID-19 researchers, and compared them to Nazis and Pol Pot. In March 2024, twelve scientists made a formal complaint to Rutgers about Ebright and Nickels, saying they had posted messages to social media which risked their safety and which could be defamatory. Ebright reacted to the complaint saying it was "a crude effort to silence [...] opponents" and Nickels said the complaint contained "deliberate lies".

=== Negative societal effects ===
According to Paul Thacker (writing for the British Medical Journal), some scientists and reporters said that "objective consideration of COVID-19's origins went awry early in the pandemic, as researchers who were funded to study viruses with pandemic potential launched a campaign labelling the lab leak hypothesis as a 'conspiracy theory.'" In February 2020, a letter was published in The Lancet authored by 27 scientists and spearheaded by Peter Daszak which described some alternate origin ideas as "conspiracy theories". Biosecurity researcher Filippa Lentzos said some scientists "closed ranks" as a result, fearing for their careers and grants. The letter was criticized by WHO adviser Jamie Metzl for "scientific propaganda and thuggery", and by journalist Katherine Eban as having had a "chilling effect" on scientific research and the scientific community by implying that scientists who "bring up the lab-leak theory ... are doing the work of conspiracy theorists".

Early in 2020, scientists including infectious disease researcher Jeremy Farrar, and virologists Kristian G. Andersen and Robert F. Garry, among others, sent emails to Fauci with questions regarding what Andersen referred to as "crackpot conspiracy theories" about a lab leak, and whether evidence supported them. NIH director Francis Collins was concerned at the time that discussion of the possibility could damage "international harmony". After the discovery of similar viruses in nature, more research into the genome, and the availability of more genomic sequences from the early days of the pandemic, these scientists publicly stated they supported the zoonotic theory as the most likely explanation.

Some journalists and scientists said they dismissed or avoided discussing the lab leak theory during the first year of the pandemic as a result of perceived polarization resulting from Donald Trump's embrace of the lab leak theory. The chair of the Board of Governors of the American Academy of Microbiology, Arturo Casadevall, said that, he (like many others) previously underestimated the lab leak hypothesis "mainly because the emphasis then [early in the pandemic] was on the idea of a deliberately engineered virus". However, by May 2021 it was a "long-simmering concern" in scientific circles, and that he perceived "greater openness" to it.

By fall 2022, the scientific consensus was that the pandemic most likely began with a natural zoonosis. The most likely natural reservoir is believed to reside in bats, with a possible intermediate host (such as palm civets, minks, or pangolins), before spillover into humans. In March 2023, James Alwine and colleagues argued that continuing to frame the lab leak hypothesis as being as likely as natural spillover was responsible for a misdirection of scientific effort, which could compromise progress towards preparing for future pandemics.

In August 2024 the Lancet Microbe published an editorial saying it is "simply wrong" to assert that SARS-CoV-2 is of unnatural origin, and ascribed continued interest in the unnatural origin idea to irresponsible journalism and political motivation. The editorial expressed concern that the furore around the virus's origins had a "chilling effect" on legitimate virology research and could jeopardise mankind's safety from pathogens in the future.

=== Government and intelligence agencies ===
Some intelligence agencies have assessed the possibility of a lab leak origin for SARS-CoV-2. Such assessments evaluate source credibility rather than conduct scientific research.

Germany's Defence Ministry dismissed the lab leak theory as a U.S. political distraction from failures in its pandemic response, according to an internal 2020 memo reported by Der Spiegel. In 2025, German newspapers said that an unpublished 2020 Federal Intelligence Service report estimated a 80–90% probability of a lab leak. In late 2024, the German government requested an external review of the unpublished report.

An August 2021 U.S. report, commissioned by President Biden, found no evidence of Chinese foreknowledge of the COVID-19 outbreak. The inconclusive assessment included four agencies (and the National Intelligence Council) favoring zoonotic origin with low confidence, three undecided, and the FBI supporting a lab leak with moderate confidence. British intelligence deemed a lab leak "feasible".

In February 2023, the U.S. Department of Energy shifted to a "low confidence" lab leak assessment, indicating unreliable sources. FBI Director Christopher Wray reiterated the bureau's stance, accusing China of obstructing investigations. National Security Advisor Jake Sullivan stated that there was "no definitive answer." to the pandemic origins' question.

A declassified June 2023 Office of the Director of National Intelligence report found no evidence of SARS-CoV-2 in labs or biosafety incidents but could not rule out a leak. Most agencies (with low confidence) favored zoonotic origin. Lab leak proponents accused intelligence agencies of bias or incompetence. Science reporter Liam Mannix called it the end of the lab leak theory.

In 2025, the CIA stated the virus was "more likely" from a lab leak but with "low confidence". On April 18, 2025, the second Trump administration took down the federal government's COVID.gov and COVIDtests.gov websites, and redirected the domains to a whitehouse.gov page endorsing the lab leak theory. Virologist Angela Rasmussen called the page "pure propaganda, intended to justify the systematic devastation of... programs devoted to public health and biomedical research".

=== Developments since 2022 ===
In June 2022, the WHO released a report advocating for more investigation into the lab leak theory. In response, Chinese Foreign Ministry spokesperson Zhao Lijian called the lab leak theory "a lie concocted by anti-China forces for political purposes, which has nothing to do with science".

In July 2022, two articles appeared in the journal Science analyzing all available epidemiological and genetic evidence from the earliest known cases in Wuhan. Based on two different analyses, the authors of both papers concluded that the outbreak began at the Huanan Seafood Wholesale Market and was unconnected to any laboratory. University of Sydney virologist Edward C. Holmes, who co-authored both papers, commented that "The siren has definitely sounded on the lab leak theory" and "There's no emails. There's no evidence in any of the science. There's absolutely nothing". A third paper (a pre-print) examined RNA samples taken directly from the market in the spring of 2020 and detected SARS-CoV-2 RNA in environmental samples collected from animal stalls and sewage wells at the market. The RNA detected was highly similar to viruses which infected early outbreak patients who became sick after being present at the market. No virus was detected in any samples taken directly from animals at the market.

In 2026, virologist Joel Wertheim and colleagues at UCSD published a study in the journal Cell which compared evolutionary patterns of outbreaks of Ebola, influenza and other viruses. They found that the mutation pattern of SARS-CoV-2 matched five naturally occurring outbreaks, but did not resemble the 1977 Russian flu outbreak which was likely from a lab leak.
