= Vorobey =

Vorobey (Воробей) is an East Slavic surname which means "sparrow". It is particularly common in Ukraine and Belarus. Alternative spellings include Vorobei, Vorobej, and Worobey. Notabe people include:

== Vorobey ==
- Aleksandr Vorobey (born 1957), Soviet-Belarusian athlete
- Andriy Vorobey (born 1978), Ukrainian footballer
- Dmytro Vorobey (born 1985), Ukrainian footballer
- Elena Vorobey (born 1967), Russian actor and stand-up comedian
- Pavel Vorobey (born 1997), Belarusian ice hockey player
- Roman Vorobey (footballer, born 1994), Ukrainian footballer
- Roman Vorobey (footballer, born 1995), Ukrainian footballer

== Variants ==
- Michael Worobey, Canadian evolutionary biologist
