= Roman Vorobey =

Roman Vorobey may refer to:

- Roman Vorobey (footballer, born 1994), Ukrainian footballer
- Roman Vorobey (footballer, born 1995), Ukrainian footballer
