= Couch potato (disambiguation) =

A couch potato is a person who leads a sedentary lifestyle.

Couch potato may also refer to:

- "Couch Potato" (song), a song by Weird Al Yankovic
- Couch Potato (TV series), an Australian children's television series
- Couch Potatoes (film), a 2017 Italian film
- Couch Potatoes (game show), an American game show
- "Couch Potatoes" (Roseanne), a 1995 television episode

== See also ==
- The Couch Potato Portfolio, a low-cost strategy created by Scott Burns
