= MIT Press =

University press in Cambridge, Massachusetts

Coordinates: 42°21′43.7″N 71°5′8.0″W

- Parent company: Massachusetts Institute of Technology
- Founded: 1962; 64 years ago
- Founder: James R. Killian Jr.
- Country of origin: United States
- Headquarters location: Cambridge, Massachusetts
- Distribution: Penguin Random House Publishing Services
- Key people: Amy Brand (director)
- Publication types: Books, academic journals
- Official website: mitpress.mit.edu

The MIT Press is the university press of the Massachusetts Institute of Technology (MIT), a private research university in Cambridge, Massachusetts. The MIT Press publishes more than 300 books and over 40 academic journals each year, and pioneers open access models in academic publishing.

The MIT Press primarily publishes academic and general interest titles, including textbooks, across fields spanning art and design, architecture, business, cognitive science, computer science, technology, and more.

== History ==
The MIT Press traces its origins back to 1926 when MIT published a lecture series entitled Problems of Atomic Dynamics by the visiting German physicist and later Nobel Prize winner, Max Born. In 1932, MIT established the imprint Technology Press.

This imprint was founded by James R. Killian, Jr., then editor of MIT's alumni magazine, Technology Review, and later MIT's 11th president. Technology Press published eight titles independently until 1937, when it entered into an arrangement with John Wiley & Sons in which Wiley took over distribution and editorial responsibilities. Wiley and the press published 125 titles together until their association ended in 1962. Since then, the press, a unit of MIT, has published independently of other publishers.

In 1961, Technology Press was renamed the MIT Press, and in 1962 Carroll Bowen was appointed the MIT Press's first director. During his tenure, the press significantly expanded its title output, resulting in higher sales and income from rights licensing. Additionally, Muriel Cooper, the press's inaugural design director, was hired, sparking a visual transformation that established the MIT Press's reputation for innovative and daring design. In 1964, Cooper created the MIT Press's colophon that continues to serve as the brand's identifying symbol.

In 1969, a journals division was added, and in 1970 a European marketing office was opened. Following Bowen's departure the same year, Howard R. Webber was appointed director of the press.

In 1975, Frank Urbanowski was appointed director and brought about new initiatives for the press. In response to the economic downturn, Urbanowski refined MIT Press's publishing strategy. The press focused on publishing deeply within a more limited range of subjects that reflected MIT's strengths. These areas included: architecture and arts, computer science and artificial intelligence, economics/finance, brain and cognitive science, neuroscience, and environmental studies. The MIT Press Bookstore opened in Kendall Square in 1980 to showcase its distinctive publications and serve the Cambridge community.

Between 1992 and 1994, the MIT Press developed an online catalog, one of the first launched by a publisher, and in 1995 published its first fully open access book, City of Bits: Space, Place and the Infobahn by William J. Mitchell. In 1996, the press designed and then deployed CogNet, a prime resource for researchers, academicians, professionals, and students interested in the broad field of study and discourse in cognitive and brain sciences. That same year, the press debuted its first electronic-only journal, Chicago Journal of Theoretical Computer Science.

Frank Urbanowski retired from the MIT Press in 2003, and Ellen Faran became director. In 2011, the MIT Press launched the Essential Knowledge Series, a growing collection of accessible, concise books written by leading thinkers on topics ranging from the cultural and historical to the scientific and technical.

Amy Brand was named Director and Publisher of the MIT Press in 2015. The press transitioned its worldwide sales and distribution to Penguin Random House Publisher Services in July 2020. In 2021, the MIT Press launched Direct to Open, a collective action open access business model for scholarly monographs. This initiative allows the press to make many of its scholarly monographs and edited collections freely available to the public.

In 2019, the press launched the MIT Press Reader, a digital magazine that draws on the press's archive and family of authors to produce adapted excerpts, interviews, and other original works. The publication "aims to illuminate the bold ideas and voices that make up the Press's expansive catalog, to revisit overlooked passages, and to dive into the stories that inspired the books". The magazine's stories have been republished by outlets including Scientific American, Popular Science, BBC Future, Smithsonian magazine, Time magazine, and others.

== Notable works ==
- Becher, Bernd, and Hilla Becher. Water Towers. (1988)
- Braitenberg, Valentino. Vehicles: Experiments in Synthetic Psychology. (1984)
- Chomsky, Noam. Aspects of the Theory of Syntax. (1965)
- Dennett, Daniel C. Brainstorms: Philosophical Essays on Mind and Psychology. (1978)
- Eco, Umberto. How to Write a Thesis. (1977)
- Frederick, Matthew. 101 Things I Learned in Architecture School. (2007)
- Kotlikoff, Laurence J., and Scott Burns. The Coming Generational Storm: What You Need to Know about America's Economic Future. (2004)
- Krauss, Rosalind E. The Optical Unconscious. (1993)
- Lynch, Kevin. The Image of the City. (1960)
- Maeda, John. The Laws of Simplicity. (2006)
- Manovich, Lev. The Language of New Media. (2001)
- McLuhan, Marshall. Understanding Media: The Extensions of Man. (1964, 1994)
- Payne, Christopher. Asylum: Inside the Closed World of State Mental Hospitals. Foreword by Oliver Sacks. (2009)
- Peterson, Jon. The Elusive Quest. (2022)
- Quine, Willard Van Orman. Word and Object. (1960)
- Ramón y Cajal, Santiago. Advice for a Young Investigator. (1999)
- Simon, Herbert A. The Sciences of the Artificial. (1969)
- Smil, Vaclav. Energy and Civilization. (2017)
- Sunstein, Cass R. How Change Happens. (2019)
- Turkle, Sherry. Simulation and Its Discontents. (2009)
- Varela, Francisco J., Evan T. Thompson, and Eleanor Rosch. The Embodied Mind: Cognitive Science and Human Experience. (1991)
- Venturi, Robert, Denise Scott Brown, and Steven Izenour. Learning from Las Vegas: The Forgotten Symbolism of Architectural Form. (1972)
- Vygotsky, Lev S. Thought and Language. (1962)
- Whitt, Frank Rowland, and David Gordon Wilson. Bicycling Science. (1975)
- Wingler, Hans M. Bauhaus: Weimar, Dessau, Berlin, Chicago. Edited by Joseph Stein. (1969)
- Žižek, Slavoj. The Parallax View. (2006)

=== Textbooks ===
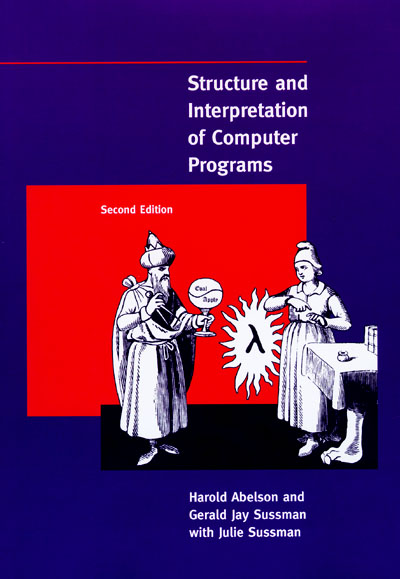
Structure and Interpretation of Computer Programs has been a steady best-seller, as a widely used introduction to computer science.

The MIT Press publishes textbooks authored by top researchers and thought leaders on a range of subjects, including computer science, science and technology, math, engineering, humanities, social science, business, and economics. These works aim to be accessible and innovative.

==== Notable textbooks ====
- Abelson, Harold, and Gerald Jay Sussman, with Julie Sussman. Structure and Interpretation of Computer Programs. (1984)
- Benninga, Simon. Financial Modeling. (1997)
- Churchland, Paul M. Matter and Consciousness: A Contemporary Introduction to the Philosophy of Mind. (1984)
- Cormen, Thomas H., Charles E. Leiserson, and Ronald L. Rivest. Introduction to Algorithms. (1990)
- Gazzaniga, Michael S., ed. The Cognitive Neurosciences. (1994)
- Goodfellow, Ian, Yoshua Bengio, and Aaron Courville. Deep Learning. (2016)

=== Essential Knowledge Series ===
Launched in 2011, the MIT Press Essential Knowledge Series is a growing collection of accessible, concise, and elegantly designed books that lie at the heart of the press's catalog. Written by leading thinkers, the books deliver expert overviews of subjects that range from the cultural and the historical to the scientific and the technical. These works offer foundational knowledge that informs principled understandings of the world. As of October 2026, its titles include:

- AI Assistants
- AI Ethics
- Algorithms
- Annotation
- Artificial General Intelligence
- Auctions
- Auditing AI
- Biofabrication
- Blockchain Governance
- The Book
- Cloud Computing
- Collaborative Society
- Computational Thinking
- Computing
- Cryptocurrency and Blockchain
- Cryptography
- Cybersecurity
- Cyborg
- Data Science
- Deep Learning
- Differential Privacy
- Endangered Languages
- Espionage
- Extraterrestrials
- Fake Photos
- Fertility Technology
- fMRI
- The Future
- GPS
- Haptics
- Information and Society
- Information and the Modern Corporation
- Intellectual Property Strategy
- The Internet of Things
- The Internet Stack
- Large Language Models
- Machine Learning
- Machine Translation
- Memes in Digital Culture
- Memory
- Metadata
- The Mind–Body Problem
- MOOCs
- Neurolinguistics
- Neuroplasticity
- Nuclear Weapons
- Open Access
- Phenology
- Phenomenology
- Plastics
- Platforms
- Quantum Entanglement
- Recommendation Engines
- Recycling
- Robot Ethics
- Robots
- Self-Tracking
- Smart Cities
- Spaceflight
- Spatial Computing
- Standards
- Sustainability
- Tech Monopoly
- The Technological Singularity
- Universal Basic Income
- Virtual Reality
- Waves

== Colophon ==
MIT Press's logo

Since 1964, the MIT Press has used a colophon, or publisher's logo, created by its longtime design director, Muriel Cooper. The design is based on a highly abstracted version of the lowercase letters "mitp", with the ascender of the 't' at the fifth stripe and the descender of the 'p' at the sixth stripe as the only differentiation in the stripe pattern. The mark has been a reference point for designs across MIT, notably the 2015 redesign of the MIT Media Lab logo by Pentagram.

In 2023, the Museum of Modern Art in New York City acquired the MIT Press colophon for its permanent design collection.

== Open access ==
The MIT Press is a pioneer in open access publishing, a movement dedicated to democratizing global access to scholarship. Beginning in 1995, the press published its first open access book, City of Bits by William J. Mitchell. Now the press publishes open access (OA) monographs, textbooks, and journals while developing innovative funding models for OA programs. As of 2026, roughly 30% of the press's books and 50% of journal articles are open access.

Through open book and journal programs, the press removes financial barriers for both readers and researchers. In 2021, the press launched Direct to Open, a framework for open access monographs that eliminates author-facing fees. Through D2O, 80 monographs were made freely available in the program's second year. In 2023, the press debuted Shift+OPEN, which transitions subscription journals to Diamond Open Access. Complementing these programs, the MIT Press Open Architecture and Urban Studies is a digital collection of classic and previously out-of-print architecture and urban studies books hosted on the digital book platform, MIT Press Direct.

== MIT Kids Press and MITeen Press ==
In 2019, the MIT Press partnered with Candlewick Press to launch two new imprints for young readers, MIT Kids Press and MITeen Press. These imprints publish books for children and young adults on STEAM topics. In this pioneering partnership, MIT Press reviews proposals for new books and manages editorial evaluation for accuracy. The books are then handed off to Candlewick to oversee design, marketing, promotion, and sales of the new titles. The first title published under this imprint was Ada and the Galaxies, by MIT professor Alan Lightman.

== MIT Press Bookstore ==
Since 1980, the MIT Press Bookstore has been a regional attraction in the heart of the Kendall Square technology and innovation hub in Cambridge, Massachusetts. The bookstore is one of a small number of such outlets operated by any university publisher. It has offered a complete selection of press titles for browsing and retail purchase, plus a large selection of complementary works from other academic and trade publishers, including magazines and academic journals.

Starting in October 2016, the bookstore was temporarily relocated to Central Square, just north of the original location of the MIT Museum, because of extensive construction in Kendall Square. In 2022, the bookstore moved into a new building at 314 Main Street, adjacent to a newly renovated subway entrance to Kendall/MIT station. Sharing the same building, in 2022 the MIT Museum moved to Kendall Square for the first time, including its newly expanded museum store.

The relocated bookstore has adopted the slogan "Kendall Square's Underground Bookstore", acknowledging its underground location below the MIT Museum (although with a large opening affording a direct view into its space from the street). In addition to expanding its coverage of academic and technical publications in both the sciences and the humanities, the MIT Press Bookstore features an expanded kid-friendly area dedicated to educational books for children and pre-teens. The bookstore also features a selection of travel and historical guides to Boston and the surrounding region, from a variety of publishers.

== Journals ==
The MIT Press published its inaugural journals, Linguistic Inquiry and Journal of Interdisciplinary History in 1970. The Journals Division was established in 1972 and now publishes more than 40 scholarly journals. The division has grown substantially over the decades, adding several journals of strong reputation including International Security, The Review of Economics and Statistics, October, and Journal of Cognitive Neuroscience. The MIT Press Journals Division's experimental approach is evident in journals such as Harvard Data Science Review and Rapid Reviews\Infectious Diseases.

=== Active journals ===
- African Arts
- American Journal of Law and Equality
- Antikythera
- Artificial Life
- ARTMargins
- Asian Economic Papers
- Computational Linguistics
- Computer Music Journal
- CriticalProductive
- Daedalus
- Design Issues
- Education Finance and Policy
- European Journal of Cultural and Political Sociology
- European Societies
- Evolutionary Computation
- Global Environmental Politics
- Grey Room
- Harvard Data Science Review
- Hello World (distribution only)
- Imaging Neuroscience
- Innovations: Technology, Governance, Globalization
- International Security
- Journal of Climate Resilience & Climate Justice
- Journal of Cognitive Neuroscience
- Journal of Cold War Studies
- The Journal of Interdisciplinary History
- Leonardo
- Linguistic Inquiry
- Negotiation Journal
- Network Neuroscience
- Neural Computation
- Neurobiology of Language
- The New England Quarterly
- October
- Open Mind
- Perspecta
- Perspectives on Science
- PRESENCE: Virtual and Augmented Reality
- Projections
- Quantitative Science Studies
- Rapid Reviews\Infectious Diseases
- The Review of Economics and Statistics
- Thresholds
- Transactions of the Association for Computational Linguistics

== Important partnerships ==
Founded in 2018 as a joint venture between the MIT Media Lab and the MIT Press, Knowledge Futures (KF) is an independent nonprofit organization that develops and deploys technologies that form part of the evolving open knowledge ecosystem. The partnership paired the MIT Press, a leading publisher of scholarly works, with the MIT Media Lab, a renowned research institute, to create technologies that helped transfigure our relationship with information. KF and the MIT Press have co-developed marquee projects such as Frankenbook, the Open Encyclopedia of Cognitive Science, the Harvard Data Science Review, and the overlay journal, Rapid Reviews\Infectious Diseases.

== Nobel laureates published ==
The MIT Press publishes many award-winning authors. MIT Press has published many authors who have won Nobel Prizes.

- Daron Acemoglu (Nobel Prize in Economics, 2024)
- Philippe Aghion (Nobel Prize in Economics, 2025)
- George A. Akerlof (Nobel Prize in Economics, 2001)
- Sidney Altman (Nobel Prize in Chemistry, 1989)
- Kenneth J. Arrow (Nobel Prize in Economics, 1972)
- Robert J. Aumann (Nobel Prize in Economics, 2005)
- Abhijit Vinayak Banerjee (Nobel Prize in Economics, 2019)
- Paul Berg (Nobel Prize in Chemistry, 1980)
- Ben Bernanke (Nobel Prize in Economics, 2022)
- Max Born (Nobel Prize in Physics, 1954)
- Paul J. Crutzen (Nobel Prize in Chemistry, 1995)
- Angus Deaton (Nobel Prize in Economics, 2015)
- Peter A. Diamond (Nobel Prize in Economics, 2010)
- Esther Duflo (Nobel Prize in Economics, 2019)
- Richard Feynman (Nobel Prize in Physics, 1965)
- James J. Heckman (Nobel Prize in Economics, 2000)
- Bengt Holmström (Nobel Prize in Economics, 2016)
- Geoffrey Hinton (Nobel Prize in Physics, 2024)
- Paul Krugman (Nobel Prize in Economics, 2008)
- Robert E. Lucas Jr. (Nobel Prize in Economics, 1995)
- Eric Maskin (Nobel Prize in Economics, 2007)
- Franco Modigliani (Nobel Prize in Economics, 1985)
- Dale T. Mortensen (Nobel Prize in Economics, 2010)
- Roger B. Myerson (Nobel Prize in Economics, 2007)
- William D. Nordhaus (Nobel Prize in Economics, 2018)
- Bertil Ohlin (Nobel Prize in Economics, 1977)
- Elinor Ostrom (Nobel Prize in Economics, 2009)
- Edmund S. Phelps (Nobel Prize in Economics, 2006)
- Christopher A. Pissarides (Nobel Prize in Economics, 2010)
- Edward C. Prescott (Nobel Prize in Economics, 2004)
- Paul A. Samuelson (Nobel Prize in Economics, 1970)
- Thomas C. Schelling (Nobel Prize in Economics, 2005)
- Reinhard Selten (Nobel Prize in Economics, 1994)
- Herbert A. Simon (Nobel Prize in Economics, 1978)
- Robert J. Shiller (Nobel Prize in Economics, 2013)
- Robert M. Solow (Nobel Prize in Economics, 1987)
- Michael Spence (Nobel Prize in Economics, 2001)
- Joseph E. Stiglitz (Nobel Prize in Economics, 2001)
- James Tobin (Nobel Prize in Economics, 1981)
- Jean Tirole (Nobel Prize in Economics, 2014)

== See also ==
- List of English-language book publishing companies
- List of university presses
