= Varabei =

Varabei or Varabey (Belarusian: Варабей) is a surname. It is the Belarusian form of Vorobey. Notable people with the surname include:

- Maksim Varabei (born 1995), Belarusian biathlete
- Mikalai Varabei (born 1963), Belarusian businessman
