= COVIDtests.gov =

Former US government website

- Website type: Government services
- Available in: English; Spanish; Chinese
- Website: covidtests.gov
- Commercial: No
- Registration: No
- Launched: January 14, 2022; 4 years ago
- Current status: Defunct; now redirects to page on whitehouse.gov

COVIDtests.gov was a website through which American residents, as well as those receiving US diplomatic and military mail, could order free COVID-19 rapid antigen tests from the US government.

The site opened on January 18, 2022, a day earlier than announced. The program was suspended in September 2022 to preserve the remaining supply of tests in preparation for a potential winter COVID-19 wave as the Biden administration worked to secure greater COVID-19 funding from Congress; the program was relaunched December 15, 2022. The program was again suspended on May 11, 2023, when the COVID-19 public health emergency was ended in the United States; it was relaunched September 25, 2023, amidst a late summer rise in COVID cases.

In April 2025, the Trump administration entirely erased the site's contents; covidtests.gov and covid.gov now redirect to a page on whitehouse.gov promoting the COVID-19 lab leak theory.

== Overview ==
The website was announced by President Joe Biden in December 2021. However, it did not then have a name. On January 12, 2022, a Wednesday, the White House announced the site would be online by the following weekend.

A White House press release announcing the website on January 14 said that 500 million tests would be available when the site went live

The site initially launched with just landing pages in English and Spanish. The English one said:

Every home in the U.S. can soon order 4 free at-home COVID-19 tests. The tests will be completely free—there are no shipping costs, and you don't need to enter a credit card number.

Also on January 14, CBS News wrote: "Tests should ship within seven to 12 days of ordering, the White House says. It's likely take longer than that to reach homes, though." The New York Times said "people are unlikely to receive the free tests until the end of January at the earliest. In some parts of the country, that may be after the peak of the current surge of cases."

The site opened for orders a day ahead of schedule, on January 18. At this time, the landing page was updated and expanded. The following message appeared at the top of the English language version:

COVIDtests.gov is up and running early to help prepare for the full launch tomorrow. We have tests for every residential address in the U.S. Please check back tomorrow if you run into any unexpected issues.

At that time, the site said, "Orders will usually ship in 7-12 days."

In March 2022, the Biden administration announced a second round of four free tests available to order, and then in May 2022 a third round of eight free tests was made available to order, bringing the total number of tests a single American household could order up to 16. When the program was relaunched in December 2022, a single American household was only allowed to order 4 free tests; the 16 from before September did not carry over. When the program was again relaunched in September 2023, a single American household similarly was only given the chance to order four free tests; unordered tests from prior periods could not be claimed. However, the Biden administration allowed American households to order four additional tests, in addition to any unclaimed tests from September, on November 20, 2023.

In August 2024, the Biden administration announced plans to relaunch the distribution of free at-home COVID-19 tests at the end of September. This decision was made in response to a summertime increase in COVID-19 cases in over two dozen states and the approaching respiratory virus season in the fall.

In April 2025, the Trump administration entirely erased the site's contents, redirecting it to a page on whitehouse.gov promoting the COVID-19 lab leak theory.

== Use ==
COVIDtests.gov sent users to a special order form on the USPS website to order the tests. There, users filled out fields for contact information and shipping information.

COVIDtests.gov also provided information on how the tests work, when to use them, and what to do with the results.

Shortly after the launch, CNN reported that most of their readers who had used COVIDtests.gov had no trouble ordering, but a minority ran into problems. The site also listed phone numbers for ordering tests.
