= Vaclav Smil =

Czech-Canadian scientist and policy analyst (born 1943)

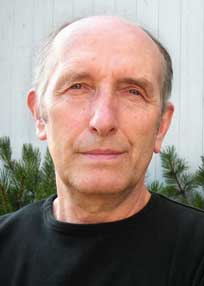
- Vaclav Smil
- Born: December 9, 1943 (age 82); Plzeň, Protectorate of Bohemia and Moravia
- Citizenship: Canadian
- Education: Charles University in Prague, Pennsylvania State University
- Scientific career
- Fields: Environmental science, public policy studies
- Workplaces: University of Manitoba
- Thesis: "Světová a československá energetika" Trans. "Energy Policy in Czechoslovakia and the world." (1969)
- Website: VaclavSmil.com

Vaclav Smil (Czech: [ˈvaːtslaf ˈsmɪl]; born December 9, 1943) is a Czech-Canadian scientist and policy analyst. He is Distinguished Professor Emeritus in the Faculty of Environment at the University of Manitoba in Winnipeg, Manitoba, Canada. His interdisciplinary research interests encompass energy, environmental, food, population, economic, historical and public policy studies. He has also applied these approaches to energy, food and environmental affairs of China.

== Early life and education ==
Smil was born during World War II in Plzeň, at that time in the German Protectorate of Bohemia and Moravia (present-day Czech Republic). His father was a police officer and his mother a bookkeeper. Growing up in a remote mountain town in the Plzeň Region, Smil cut wood daily to keep the home heated. This provided an early lesson in energy efficiency and density.

Smil completed his undergraduate studies and began his graduate work (culminating in the RNDr., an intermediate graduate degree similar to the Anglo-American Master of Philosophy credential, in 1965) at the Faculty of Natural Sciences of Charles University in Prague, where he took up to 35 hours of lectures a week, 10 months a year, for five years. "They taught me nature, from geology to clouds," Smil said. After graduation he refused to join the Communist party, undermining his job prospects, though he found employment at a regional planning office. He married Eva, who was studying to be a physician. In 1969, following the Soviet invasion of Czechoslovakia and Eva's graduation, the Smils emigrated to the United States, leaving the country months before a Soviet travel ban shut the borders. "That was not a minor sacrifice, you know?" Smil says. Smil then received his Ph.D. in geography from the College of Earth and Mineral Sciences of Pennsylvania State University in 1971.

== Career ==
In 1972, Smil took his first job offer at the University of Manitoba where he remained for decades, until his retirement. He taught introductory environmental science courses among other subjects dealing with energy, atmospheric change, China, population and economic development.

=== Position on energy ===
Smil is skeptical that there will be a rapid transition to clean energy, believing it will take much longer than many predict. Smil said "I have never been wrong on these major energy and environmental issues because I have nothing to sell," unlike many energy companies and politicians.

Smil noted in 2018 that coal, oil, and natural gas continue to make up 90% of the primary energy sources used in the world. Although renewable energy technologies have improved over time, the global share of energy produced from fossil fuels since 2000 has increased. Smil emphasizes that replacing the use of fossil carbon in the production of primary iron, cement, ammonia, and plastics is a significant and ongoing challenge in the industrial sector. Together, these industries account for 15% of the world's total fossil fuel consumption. Smil stresses the need for energy prices to reflect their true costs, including greenhouse gas emissions, and promotes a decrease in the demand for fossil fuels through energy-saving measures.

=== Position on economic growth ===
Smil believes economic growth has to end, that all growth is logistic rather than exponential, and that humans could consume much lower levels of materials and energy.

== Reception ==
Included among Smil's admirers is Microsoft co-founder Bill Gates, who has said: "I wait for new Smil books the way some people wait for the next Star Wars movie." "He's a slayer of bullshit," says David Keith, an energy and climate scientist at Harvard University.

== Personal life ==
His wife Eva is a physician and his son David is an organic synthetic chemist.

He lives in a house with unusually thick insulation, grows some of his own food, and eats meat roughly once a week. He reads 60 to 110 non-technical books a year and keeps a list of all books he has read since 1969. He "does not intend to have a cell phone ever."

Smil is known for being "intensely private", shunning the press while letting his books speak for themselves. At the University of Manitoba, he only ever showed up at one faculty meeting (since the 1980s). The school accepted his reclusiveness so long as he kept teaching and publishing highly rated books.

== Awards and honors ==
He is a Fellow of the Royal Society of Canada (Science Academy) and the recipient of the American Association for the Advancement of Science Award for Public Understanding of Science and Technology in 2000. In 2010, he was named by Foreign Policy magazine to its list of FP Top 100 Global Thinkers. In 2013, he was appointed by the Governor General to the Order of Canada. In the fall of 2013, he was the EADS Distinguished Visitor at the American Academy in Berlin.

He has been an invited speaker in more than 300 conferences and workshops in the US, Canada, Europe, Asia and Africa, has lectured at many universities in North America, Europe and East Asia and has worked as a consultant for many US, European Union and international institutions.

His book How the World Really Works: The Science Behind How We Got Here and Where We're Going was a nominee for the 2022 Balsillie Prize for Public Policy.

== Publications ==
=== Books ===
- 2025 : How to Feed the World: The History and Future of Food. Viking/Penguin. ISBN 978-0593834510
- 2023 : Invention and Innovation: A Brief History of Hype and Failure. The MIT Press. ISBN 978-0262048057
- 2023 : Size: How It Explains the World. Viking/Penguin. ISBN 978-0241506998
- 2022 : How the World Really Works: A Scientist's Guide to Our Past, Present and Future. Viking/Penguin. ISBN 978-0241454398
- 2021 : Grand Transitions: How the Modern World Was Made. Oxford University Press. ISBN 978-0241454398
- 2020 : Numbers Don't Lie: 71 Things You Need To Know About The World. Penguin. ISBN 978-0241454411
- 2019 : Growth: From Microorganisms to Megacities. The MIT Press. ISBN 0262042835
- 2017 : Energy and Civilization: A History. The MIT Press. ISBN 978-0262035774
- 2015 : Natural Gas: Fuel for the 21st Century. Wiley. ISBN 978-1119012863
- 2015 : Power Density: A Key to Understanding Energy Sources and Uses. The MIT Press. ISBN 978-0262029148
- 2013 : Making the Modern World: Materials and Dematerialization. Wiley. ISBN 978-1119942535
- 2013 : Made in the USA: The Rise and Retreat of American Manufacturing. The MIT Press. ISBN 978-0262019385
- 2013 : Should We Eat Meat? Evolution and Consequences of Modern Carnivory. Wiley. ISBN 978-1118278727
- 2013 : Harvesting the Biosphere; What We Have Taken from Nature. The MIT Press. ISBN 978-0262018562
- 2012 : Japan’s Dietary Transition and Its Impacts. The MIT Press. ISBN 978-0313381775
- 2010 : Prime Movers of Globalization: The History and Impact of Diesel Engines and Gas Turbines. The MIT Press. ISBN 978-0262014434
- 2010 : Energy Myths and Realities: Bringing Science to the Energy Policy Debate. The AEI Press.ISBN 978-0844743288
- 2010 : Energy Transitions: History, Requirements, Prospects. Praeger. ISBN 978-0313381775
- 2010 : Why America Is Not a New Rome. MIT Press. ISBN 978-0262195935
- 2008 : Global Catastrophes and Trends: The Next Fifty Years. The MIT Press. ISBN 978-0262195867
- 2008 : Oil: A Beginner's Guide. Oneworld Publications. ISBN 978-1851685714
- 2008 : Energy in Nature and Society: General Energetics of Complex Systems. The MIT Press.ISBN 9780262693561
- 2006 : Energy: A Beginner's Guide. Oneworld Publications. ISBN 978-1851684526
- 2006 : Transforming the Twentieth Century: Technical Innovations and Their Consequences. Oxford University Press. ISBN 9780195168754
- 2005 : Creating the Twentieth Century: Technical Innovations of 1867–1914 and Their Lasting Impact. Oxford University Press. ISBN 9780195168747
- 2004 : China’s Past, China’s Future. RoutledgeCurzon.
- 2003 : Energy at the Crossroads: Global Perspectives and Uncertainties. The MIT Press.
- 2002 : The Earth's Biosphere: Evolution, Dynamics and Change. The MIT Press.
- 2001 : Enriching the Earth: Fritz Haber, Carl Bosch and the Transformation of World Food Production. The MIT Press.
- 2000 : Feeding the World: A Challenge for the 21st Century. The MIT Press.
- 1998 : Energies: An Illustrated Guide to the Biosphere and Civilization. The MIT Press.
- 1997 : Cycles of Life: Civilization and the Biosphere. Scientific American Library.
- 1994 : Energy in World History. Westview Press.
- 1993 : China's Environment: An Inquiry into the Limits of National Development. M. E. Sharpe. Winner of the 1995 Joseph Levenson Book Prize.
- 1993 : Global Ecology: Environmental Change and Social Flexibility. Routledge.
- 1991 : General Energetics: Energy in the Biosphere and Civilization. Wiley.
- 1988 : Energy in China's Modernization. M.E. Sharpe.
- 1987 : Energy Food Environment: Realities Myths Options. Oxford University Press.
- 1985 : Carbon Nitrogen Sulfur: Human Interference in Grand Biospheric Cycles. Plenum Press.
- 1984 : The Bad Earth: Environmental Degradation in China. M.E. Sharpe.
- 1983 : Biomass Energies: Resources, Links, Constraints. Plenum Press.
- 1982 : (in collaboration with P. Nachman and T. V. Long, II). Energy Analysis in Agriculture: An Application to U.S. Corn Production. Westview Press.
- 1980 : (in collaboration with W. E. Knowland). Energy in the Developing World. Oxford University Press.
- 1976 : China's Energy: Achievements, Problems, Prospects. Praeger.

=== Articles ===
- "Good Eats". Inference, vol. 5, no. 1 (December 12, 2019)
- "Sputnik at 60". IEEE Spectrum, September 26, 2017.
- "A Skeptic Looks at Alternative Energy". IEEE Spectrum, July 2012.
- "Energy innovation as a process: Lessons from LNG". Master Resource: A Free-Market Energy Blog, January 11, 2010.
- "Two decades later: Nikkei and lessons from the fall". The American, December 29, 2009.
- "The Iron Age & coal-based coke: A neglected case of fossil-fuel dependence". Master Resource: A Free-Market Energy Blog, September 17, 2009.
- "U.S. energy policy: The need for radical departures". Issues in Science and Technology, Summer 2009:47–50.
- "Long-range energy forecasts are no more than fairy tales". Nature 453:154 (2008).
- "Moore's curse and the great energy delusion". The American 2(6): 34–41 (2008).
- "Water news: bad, good and virtual". American Scientist, 96:399–407 (2008).
- "On meat, fish and statistics: The global food regime and animal consumption in the United States and Japan". Japan Focus, October 19, 2008.
- James N. Galloway, Marshall Burke, G. Eric Bradford, Rosamond Naylor, Walter Falcon, Ashok K. Chapagain, Joanne C. Gaskell, Ellen McCullough, Harold A. Mooney, Kirsten L. L. Oleson, Henning Steinfeld, Tom Wassenaar and Vaclav Smil. "International trade in meat: The tip of the pork chop". Ambio 36:622–629 (2007).
- "The two prime movers of globalization: history and impact of diesel engines and gas turbines". Journal of Global History, 3:373–394 (2007).
- "Global material cycles". Encyclopedia of Earth, June 2, 2007.
- "The unprecedented shift in Japan's population: Numbers, age, and prospects". Japan Focus, May 1, 2007.
- "Light behind the fall: Japan's electricity consumption, the environment, and economic growth". Japan Focus, April 2, 2007.
- "21st century energy: Some sobering thoughts". OECD Observer, 2006.
- "Peak oil: A catastrophist cult and complex realities". World Watch 19: 22–24 (2006).
- Naylor, R., Steinfeld, H., Falcon, W., Galloway, J., Smil, V., Bradford, E., Alder, J., Mooney, H. "Losing the links between livestock and land". Science 310:1621–1622.
- "The next 50 years: Unfolding trends:. Population and Development Review, 31: 605–643 (2005).
- "Feeding the world: How much more rice do we need?" In: Toriyama K., Heong K.L., Hardy B., eds. Rice is life: scientific perspectives for the 21st century. Proceedings of the World Rice Research Conference held in Tokyo and Tsukuba, Japan, November 4–7, 2004. Los Baños (Philippines): International Rice Research Institute, pp. 21–23.
- "The next 50 Years: Fatal discontinuities". Population and Development Review, 31: 201–236 (2005).
- "Improving efficiency and reducing waste in our food system". Environmental Sciences, 1:17–26 (2004).

=== Filmography ===
- Surviving Progress, a 2011 Canadian documentary in which Smil appears
- Inside Bill's Brain: Decoding Bill Gates, a 2019 Netflix Documentary in which Smil appears
