= Energy and Civilization: A History =

2017 book by Vaclav Smil

Civilization: A History
- First edition
- Author: Vaclav Smil
- Language: English
- Subjects: energy; civilization; history
- Publisher: The MIT Press
- Publication date: 2017

Energy and Civilization: A History is a 2017 book by Vaclav Smil, published by The MIT Press.

The book is a "comprehensive account of how energy has shaped society throughout history" and is an updated and expanded version of Smil's Energy in World History (1994).
