= James Lyons-Weiler =

American scientist

James F. Lyons-Weiler
- Education: University of Nevada, Reno
- Scientific career
- Fields: Ecology
- Workplaces: Institute for Pure and Applied Knowledge; University of Pittsburgh
- Thesis: Data exploration and hypothesis testing in statistical and computational phylogenetic systematics (1998)

James Lyons-Weiler (born July 4, 1967) is an American antivaxxer activist who operates the non-profit organization Institute for Pure and Applied Knowledge. His doctorate is in ecology, evolution and conservation biology. He was a University of Pittsburgh faculty member (2003-2009) and a member of the Early Detection Research Network through the University of Pittsburgh Cancer Institute.

== History ==
Lyons-Weiler worked as an assistant professor and co-director of the Center for Bioinformatics and Computational Biology at the University of Massachusetts Lowell from 2000 to 2002. He then served as faculty at the University of Pittsburgh from 2003 to 2009.

== Controversies ==
Lyons-Weiler has been making numerous claims about COVID-19, and about vaccines in general for years.

He claimed in February 2020 that a specific genetic sequence INS1378 in the SARS-CoV-2 genome was sufficiently close to pShuttle-SN - an engineered sequence - to prove that the virus was probably engineered in a laboratory. This claim was repeatedly discredited by researchers and fact-checkers. The sequences were only 67% similar and one paper demonstrated that over 100 bat coronaviruses had closer matches to INS1378 than pShuttle-SN. The even more inaccurate claim that SARS-CoV-2 contained pShuttle-SN was, however, spread widely by Infowars and others.

His WordPress blog, Science, Public Health Policy and the Law claims to be a scientific journal, with an advisory board consisting of three other prominent anti-vaccine personalities.
