= Michael Worobey =

Canadian evolutionary biologist

- Born: Quesnel, British Columbia, Canada
- Education: Simon Fraser University; University of Oxford
- Awards: Rhodes Scholarship
- Scientific career
- Workplaces: University of Arizona
- Thesis: The occurrence and impact of viral recombination (2001)
- Doctoral advisors: Eddie Holmes; Paul Harvey

Michael Worobey is a Canadian evolutionary biologist, and a professor and department head of Ecology and Evolutionary Biology at the University of Arizona. He has done important work in the study of the evolution of HIV-1, which demonstrated the extensive genetic diversity of the virus by 1960, refuting the contaminated polio vaccine theory as the origin of the AIDS pandemic.

In May 2021, Worobey signed a letter, published in the journal Science, calling for a thorough investigation into the origin of SARS-CoV-2, including the possibility of a lab leak. Then, after thoroughly analyzing the available data, Worobey concluded that the virus most likely originated with animals sold at the Huanan Seafood Wholesale Market and subsequently jumped to humans.

== Early life and education ==
Worobey grew up in Salmon Arm, British Columbia and earned his bachelors in biological sciences from Simon Fraser University. During his university years, he worked summers as a firefighter with the B.C. Wildfire Service. Winning a Rhodes Scholarship, Worobey went to the University of Oxford in 1997. Worobey joined the evolutionary biology group in the zoology department at Oxford, where he worked with Eddie Holmes and Paul Harvey, who served as his thesis advisors. Worobey also worked with Bill Hamilton to research the origin of HIV/AIDS.

In January 2000, as part of the HIV investigation, Worobey traveled with Hamilton to the Democratic Republic of Congo. They collected samples of chimpanzee feces and urine for later analysis. Worobey injured his hand and developed a life-threatening infection while Hamilton contracted malaria. Worobey survived, but Hamilton died within weeks of their return to Oxford. Worobey continued his graduate studies in zoology at Oxford and received his doctoral degree in 2001.
