= Rapid Reviews: Infectious Diseases =

Rapid Reviews\Infectious Diseases
- Discipline: Virology, public health
- Language: English
- Edited by: Stefano Bertozzi

Publication details
- Former name: Rapid Reviews: COVID-19
- History: 2020–present
- Publisher: MIT Press (United States)
- Open access: Yes
- License: CC BY-NC 4.0

Standard abbreviations
- ISO 4: Rapid Rev.: Infect. Dis.

Indexing
- ISSN: 2692-4072
- LCCN: 2020200249
- OCLC no.: 1157343904

Links
- Journal homepage

Rapid Reviews\Infectious Diseases, also known as RR\ID and formerly known as Rapid Reviews: COVID-19, or RR:C19, is an open access interdisciplinary medical journal published by the MIT Press. It publishes peer reviews and editorials of timely, publicly-posted preprints relevant to all aspects of the COVID-19 pandemic. The journal was established in June 2020 with Stefano Bertozzi (University of California, Berkeley) as editor-in-chief.

== History ==
The journal was established as a joint effort between MIT Press and UC Berkeley in June 2020 to accelerate the peer review process on topical pre-prints are noteworthy or controversial that could alter the course of the pandemic.

The journal uses a transdisciplinary approach with five principal domains of review: Biological and Chemical Sciences, Physical Sciences and Engineering, Medical and Clinical Sciences, Public Health, and Humanities and Social Sciences. The editorial board includes numerous leaders across the five domains. Each domain is supported by a team of graduate students and early career researchers from across the world to identify important preprints on medRxiv, bioRxiv, SSRN, and other repositories where unreviewed scholarly content is posted.

== Yan report and COVID-19 origins controversy ==
In September 2020, Li-Meng Yan published a preprint on the open access repository Zenodo claiming that SARS-CoV-2, the virus responsible for the COVID-19 pandemic, was rationally designed in a Chinese lab. Rapid Reviews: COVID-19 published the first independent Rapid Reviews for the "Yan Report", all of whom unanimously concluded the manuscript's claims were unsubstantiated by the evidence offered. RR:C19's contribution to the evolving "COVID-19 Origins" debate was covered by The Washington Post, The Nation, and FactCheck.org.

== Academic publishing innovation ==
The journal created an academic publishing model seeking to leverage open access preprint servers as the primary source of content and AI technology for content curation, using a COVIDScholar platform developed by members of the Lawrence Berkeley National Laboratory. The journal provides a model for reviewing preprint literature and science communication.
