= Scott Burns (newspaper columnist) =

American journalist

Scott Burns is an American newspaper columnist and author who has covered personal finance and investments for over 30 years. He is known for creating the "Couch Potato Portfolio" investment strategy, which advocates the use of index funds over managed funds or stock-picking. In 2006, he co-founded the Web startup AssetBuilder, where he is chief investment strategist.

== Biography ==
=== Education ===
Burns graduated from the Massachusetts Institute of Technology with a degree in humanities and biology (1962).

=== Career ===
Burns began his career as a newspaper columnist at the Boston Herald in 1977 where he was also the financial editor. The column was nationally syndicated in 1981 and is now distributed by Universal Press Syndicate. In 1985 he joined the staff of The Dallas Morning News where his column became one of the most widely read features in the paper. Retiring as a Dallas Morning News staff member in 2006, he continued to contribute to the paper through his ongoing syndication. He announced his retirement in 2017

In August 2006, Burns co-founded AssetBuilder, a registered investment advisory firm, with former Microsoft executive Kennon Grose. The firm offers investors a means to employ an advanced version of Burns's "Couch Potato Portfolio" investment methodology through a Web-based service platform. Burns is chief investment strategist for AssetBuilder.

=== Financial writing ===
In December 2001 the National Center for Policy Analysis published a paper Burns co-authored with benefits attorney Brooks Hamilton titled, "Reinventing Retirement Income in America." The paper was influential in advocating automatic enrollment, automatic increases in contributions, managed accounts, and little or no company stock, all of which have become trends in corporate retirement plans.

Burns's book The Coming Generational Storm was co-authored with Boston University economist Laurence J. Kotlikoff. The book was endorsed by five Nobel laureates, listed as one of the 25 best books of 2004 by Barron's, and named one of the top 10 business books of 2004 by Forbes. The book warns of a worldwide generational financial crunch and advises investors on how to protect themselves.

Kotlikoff and Burns recently wrote a second book, Spend 'Til the End, presenting new ideas in financial planning based on consumption smoothing. The book was published by Simon & Schuster in June 2008.

=== The Couch Potato Portfolio ===
The original Couch Potato Portfolio strategy included investing half of the investor's assets in a Standard & Poor's 500 Index fund and half in a fund mirroring the Shearson/Lehman Intermediate Bond Index. Burns used the Vanguard 500 Index and Vanguard Total Bond Fund Index.

As described by Shauna Croome-Carther in Investopedia:

Those with higher risk tolerance can modify the 50/50 asset allocation strategy to 25% in the Vanguard Total Bond Fund Index and 75% in the Vanguard 500 Index. The 25/75 allocation is known as the 'sophisticated couch-potato portfolio'. The higher weighting in equities is more suitable for younger investors, and those closer to retirement need more security. Ever since the concept originated, the couch-potato strategy has been modified to suit individual needs from various countries.

Originally it had been designed for the US market, but the term "couch potato portfolio" is now a general term for "a technique for building a diversified, low-maintenance portfolio designed to deliver the returns of the overall stock and bond markets with minimal cost".

== Published works ==
- Squeeze It Till the Eagle Grins (1972)
- Home, Inc., The Hidden Wealth and Power of the American Household (1975).
- "Reinventing Retirement Income in America" (with Brooks Hamilton; National Center for Policy Analysis, 2001)
- The Coming Generational Storm (with Laurence Kotlikoff; MIT Press, 2004)
- Spend Til' the End (with Laurence Kotlikoff; Simon & Schuster, 2008)

Burns's articles and columns have appeared in Worth, Boston, Playboy, Vogue and Harper's Bazaar.
