= Li-Meng Yan =

Chinese virologist

- Born: 1983 or 1984 (age 41–42); Qingdao, Shandong, China
- Education: Central South University (Master of Medicine 医学硕士学位); Southern Medical University (Doctor of Medicine 医学博士学位 in ophthalmology); University of Hong Kong (Postdoctoral Fellow)
- Medical career
- Profession: Post-doctoral researcher
- Field: Medicine
- Institutions: University of Hong Kong School of Public Health; State Key Laboratory of Virology, Wuhan Institute of Virology, Chinese Academy of Sciences; University of Chinese Academy of Sciences
- Sub-specialties: Immunology
- Research: Influenza vaccine

Li-Meng Yan or Yan Limeng (simplified Chinese: 闫丽梦; traditional Chinese: 閆麗夢) is a Chinese virologist, known for her publications and interviews alleging that SARS-CoV-2 was made in a Chinese government laboratory. Her publications have been considered flawed by the wider scientific community.In April 2020, she fled from China to the United States.

She co-authored several preprint research papers (Note: During the coronavirus pandemic, the practice of publishing scientific preprints – early drafts of research findings that are not peer-reviewed – increased in order to more rapidly share findings that might have a public benefit. Yan claimed in her papers that they could not be published in reputable, peer-reviewed journals due to "censorship.") claiming that SARS-CoV-2 was "produced in a laboratory" in China. According to scientific reviewers from the Johns Hopkins Center for Health Security, Yan's paper offered "contradictory and inaccurate information that does not support their argument," while reviewers from Rapid Reviews: COVID-19 criticised her preprints as not demonstrating "sufficient scientific evidence to support [their] claims."

== Education and early career ==
Yan is a native of Qingdao, Shandong, China.

She received her Master of Medicine 医学硕士学位 from Xiangya Medical College of Central South University in China. In 2014, she completed a Doctor of Medicine 博士学位 in ophthalmology from Southern Medical University in Guangzhou. After this, she was a postdoctoral fellow at the University of Hong Kong (HKU) until 2020.

Before the COVID-19 pandemic, Yan had served as a co-author on an article on universal influenza vaccines.

== Origins of SARS-CoV-2 ==
=== Preprint papers ===
Between September 2020 and March 2021, Yan authored a series of four preprint research papers, wherein she argued that SARS-CoV-2 did not emerge naturally in a "spillover from animals," but rather was produced in a laboratory. Her preprints were posted to the Zenodo platform, an open-access repository where anyone can post their research.

Yan stated that evidence of genetic engineering was censored in scientific journals, allegedly as part of a conspiracy to suppress information on the topic. However, other scientists disputed the validity of the papers, pointing to poor methods, undisclosed funding from politically-motivated sources, the use of pseudonyms for the papers' co-authors, and the papers having never been submitted to a journal for review. The papers were described by virologists as "non-scientific," "junk science," and written to spread "political propaganda."

Reviewers for MIT Rapid Reviews: COVID-19 (RR:C19), which seeks out preprint papers and reviews them in an attempt to reduce the spread of false or misleading scientific news, analyzed Yan's study and issued the following statement:

Given the far-reaching implications of the "Yan Report," RR:C19 sought out peer reviews from world-renowned experts in virology, molecular biology, structural biology, computational biology, vaccine development, and medicine. Collectively, reviewers have debunked the authors' claims that: (1) bat coronaviruses ZC45 or ZXC21 were used as a background strain to engineer SARS-CoV-2, (2) the presence of restriction sites flanking the RBD suggest prior screening for a virus targeting the human ACE2 receptor, and (3) the furin-like cleavage site is unnatural and provides evidence of engineering. In all three cases, the reviewers provide counter-arguments based on peer-reviewed literature and long-established foundational knowledge that directly refute the claims put forth by Yan et al. There was a general consensus that the study's claims were better explained by potential political motivations rather than scientific integrity. The peer reviewers arrived at these common opinions independently, further strengthening the credibility of the peer reviews.

=== Political links ===
Yan's preprint was promoted by the Rule of Law Society, a political organisation affiliated with Steve Bannon, former Trump strategist, and Guo Wengui, an expatriate Chinese billionaire, in November 2020. The organisation's stated intent was to investigate "Chinese corruption and financially support victims of the regime." The Rule of Law Society had not previously published scientific or medical research. Yan previously appeared on Bannon's "War Room" podcast. The lack of financial disclosure in Yan's papers was described as a lapse in ethical transparency by Dr. Adam Lauring, particularly when publishing "what are essentially conspiracy theories that are not founded in fact".

In November 2020, The New York Times reported that Yan's "trajectory was carefully crafted" by Steve Bannon and Guo Wengui, who played to rising anti-Chinese sentiments, with the goal of bringing down China's government and distracting from the Trump administration's handling of the COVID-19 pandemic. The Times article pointed out that Guo and Bannon arranged for Yan to fly first class to the United States, arranged lodging, coached her on media appearances, and arranged interviews for her with conservative media hosts such as Lou Dobbs and Tucker Carlson. During a 2025 interview Bannon attributed the success of messaging on the pandemic to her saying, "The whole arc of the story and the counternarrative that we put out about Covid, a lot of it was because of Dr. Yan."

=== Media coverage ===
In an 80-minute show in January 2020, YouTube host Wang Dinggang, also known as "Lu De", said he heard from an unnamed whistleblower who told him China was not being transparent about the outbreak in Wuhan. Wang described his source, who was later revealed to be Yan, as "the world's absolute top coronavirus expert." Although Yan worked at one of the world's top virology labs, she was fairly new to the field of virology and had not studied coronaviruses before the COVID-19 pandemic.

Between July and August, Yan was interviewed by Fox News, Newsmax TV, and the Daily Mail. Yan claimed in interviews that she became aware of person-to-person transmission of COVID-19 in late December 2019, and that she attempted to communicate the risks to her superiors in late December 2019 or early January 2020.

She stated that the Chinese government and the World Health Organization (WHO) knew about the person-to-person transmission of COVID-19 earlier than they reported or made public, and she stated that the Chinese government suppressed both her research and that of others.

An official statement issued by HKU on 11 July 2020 confirmed that Yan was formerly a post-doctoral researcher at the institution, but disputed the accuracy of other elements of her account, adding that "Dr. Yan never conducted any research on human-to-human transmission of the novel coronavirus at HKU", and that many of her claims had no scientific basis.

Since July 2020 Dr. Yan's family say that they have not spoken to her. In 2021 Yan's husband, Dr. Ranawaka Perera a Sri Lankan national, accepted a post at the University of Pennsylvania so that he could remain in the United States to seek to reconnect with her. A 2025 article in The New York Times described efforts by Yan's husband and parents to contact and reconcile with her as well as Yan's continued assertions in interviews that this behavior on the part of her family is coerced by the government of China.

== See also ==
- Ai Fen
