= David Robertson (virologist) =

Virologist at Glasgow

David L. Robertson is a research professor, head of bioinformatics and MRC Investigator at the University of Glasgow's Centre for Virus Research.

He earned a BSc from the University of Edinburgh in 1991. He completed a Ph.D. in genetics at the University of Nottingham (1993-1996) after moving with his supervisor's research group from Trinity College Dublin (1992-1993). Subsequently, he was a research associate at the University of Alabama at Birmingham, a research fellow at the CNRS, and a Wellcome Trust Research Fellow at the University of Oxford. In 2002 he became a lecturer and principal investigator at the University of Manchester. In 2017, he moved to University of Glasgow and became head of the Centre for Virus Research’s bioinformatics research programme. His research focus has been on computational approaches to the study of viruses, molecular evolution, and the analysis of viral diseases such as HIV, COVID-19, and others.
