= The Coming Generational Storm =

Book by Laurence J. Kotlikoff and Scott Burns

The Coming Generational Storm: What You Need to Know about America's Economic Future
- Author: Laurence J. Kotlikoff; Scott Burns
- Language: English
- Genre: Non-fiction
- Publisher: MIT Press
- Publication date: 2004
- Publication place: United States
- ISBN: 0-262-11286-8

The Coming Generational Storm: What You Need to Know about America's Economic Future (2004) is a book by Laurence J. Kotlikoff and Scott Burns.

In the Prologue on page xii, the authors say the United States was "heading into one God-awful fiscal storm, the full dimensions of which are hard to fathom." Further, they say on page xiii the book offers suggestions for United States public policy and personal finance to help deflect the "storm". Moreover, they state:

We feel we have some unique insights into the demographic and economic problems facing our country based on our own research and that of other economists and financial analysts. Our goal is to leave you with a real sense of what's coming, why it's coming, when it's coming, and where national and personal economic salvation does and does not lie.

"Averting America's Bankruptcy with a New New Deal", published by The Economists' Voice - February 2006, outlined some of the solutions promoted in the book. Kotlikoff also discusses his book in the Tax Foundation's podcast titled "Laurence J. Kotlikoff on Long-Term Fiscal Problems in the U.S.".

== Table of contents ==
The following is a copy of the book's table of contents.

1. Acknowledgments
2. Prologue
3. From Strollers to Walkers
4. Truth is Worse Than Fiction
5. Driving in LA with a Map of New York
6. Popular Tonics, Snake Oils, and Other Easy Fixes
7. Going Critical
8. Changing Course
9. Grab Your Life Jacket
10. Securing Your Future
11. Epilogue
12. Notes
13. Index

== See also ==
- Generational accounting
