= Laurence Kotlikoff =

American academic and politician

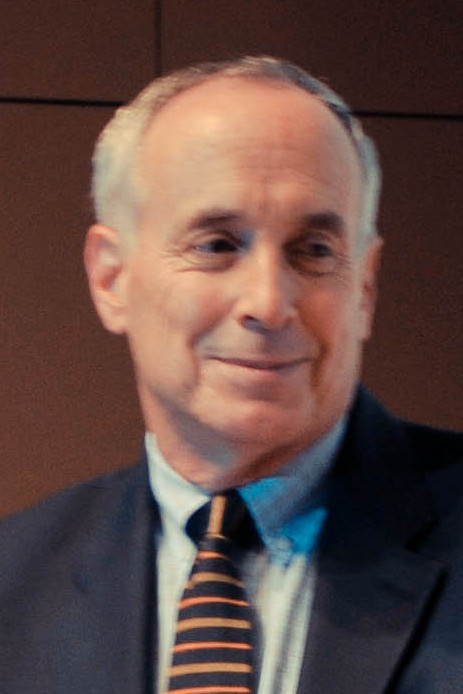
- Born: Laurence Jacob Kotlikoff; January 30, 1951 (age 75)
- Education: University of Pennsylvania (BA); Harvard University (MA, PhD)
- Scientific career
- Fields: Public finance
- Workplaces: Boston University
- Thesis: Essays on capital formation and social security, bequest formation, and long run tax incidence. (1977)

Laurence Jacob Kotlikoff (born January 30, 1951) is an American economist who has served as a professor of economics at Boston University since 1984. A specialist in macroeconomics and public finance, he has contributed to a range of fields, including climate change and carbon taxation, the global macroeconomic transition and the future of economic power, inequality, fiscal progressivity, economic guides to personal financial behavior, banking reform, marginal taxation and labor supply, healthcare reform, and social security. He is the author of over 20 books, and his scholarly articles have been published in a range of journals, including the American Economic Review, the Quarterly Journal of Economics, and the Journal of Political Economy. In 2014, The Economist ranked Kotlikoff as the 19th most influential economist in the world.

Born in 1951, Kotlikoff received a BA in economics from the University of Pennsylvania in 1973, and a PhD in economics from Harvard University in 1977. After three years as a postdoctoral fellow at UCLA, he taught as an assistant professor at Yale University from 1980 to 1981, and then as an associate professor at Yale till 1984, during which time he was a research associate at the Cowles Foundation (1980–1984), and served on the Council of Economic Advisers as a senior economist (1981–1982). He became a professor of economics at Boston University in 1984, where he twice chaired its Department of Economics, and was named a William Warren Fairfield Professor in 2009.

Kotlikoff has been a research associate at the NBER since 1980, and a research fellow at CESifo since 1999. He was elected a Fellow of the Econometric Society in 1992, and was elected to the American Academy of Arts and Sciences in 2005.

Kotlikoff has commented regularly on contemporary issues and public affairs. His columns have appeared in the New York Times, the Wall Street Journal, Bloomberg, Forbes, the PBS NewsHour, the Financial Times, the Boston Globe, Yahoo, CNBC, and other major outlets. Kotlikoff is a frequent guest on numerous podcasts and radio shows, and is routinely quoted by the media on a wide range of economic issues. Over the years, Kotlikoff has testified to Congress on tax reform, generational policy, and other economic issues on 19 occasions.

Kotlikoff attempted to run for President of the United States in 2012, and sought the nominations of the advocacy group Americans Elect and the Reform Party of the United States, before ending his campaign in May 2012, when Americans Elect ceased operations. Kotlikoff ran for president in 2016 as an independent alongside his vice president, Dr. Edward Leamer, an economist at UCLA. He achieved ballot-access in 38 states, making him one of only six people in the country that could be legally elected president. His campaign garnered major press from Bloomberg, the Wall Street Journal, the Boston Globe, and other major outlets. Kotlikoff's stated goal in running for president was to provide an economics-based policy-reform platform. After the 2016 election, Kotlikoff released his platform on his website in the form of a monograph entitled You're Hired!

== Research ==
=== Early research ===
Kotlikoff's thesis examined, in a life-cycle simulation model, the impact of intergenerational redistribution on the long-run position of the economy. He also studied whether the rich spend a larger or smaller share of their lifetime resources than do the poor. And he provided a new empirical approach to understanding the impact of Social Security on saving. At UCLA, Kotlikoff wrote a paper with Avia Spivak on intra-family risk-sharing entitled "The Family as an Incomplete Annuities Market."

He also wrote a widely cited paper with Lawrence Summers questioning the importance of saving for retirement in determining total U.S. wealth accumulation. The publication suggested that most of U.S. wealth accumulation was not attributed to life-cycle saving, but rather to private intergenerational transfers (whether intended or unintended). The article was the subject of a lively debate between Kotlikoff and Franco Modigliani, who won the Nobel Prize in part for his work on the life-cycle model.

=== Generational accounting ===
Kotlikoff, together with Alan Auerbach and Jagadeesh Gokhale, pioneered Generational Accounting, which measures the fiscal burdens facing today's and tomorrow's children. Kotlikoff's work on the relativity of fiscal language claims to show that conventional fiscal measures, including the government's deficit, are not well defined from the perspective of economic theory.

According to Kotlikoff, their measurement reflects economically arbitrary fiscal labeling conventions. He argues that an "Economics labeling problem," as he calls it, has led to gross misreadings of the fiscal positions of different countries, starting with the United States, which has a relatively small debt-to-GDP ratio, but, he argues, is in worse fiscal shape than any other developed country due to its unofficial, i.e., off-the-books, obligations. In 1991, Kotlikoff, together with Alan Auerbach and Jagadeesh Gokhale, produced the first set of generational accounts] for the United States.

Their study claimed to find a major fiscal gap separating future government spending commitments and its means of paying for those commitments, portending dramatic increases in the lifetime net tax burdens facing young and future generations. The generational accounting and fiscal gap accounting developed by Auerbach, Gokhale, and Kotlikoff is a means of assessing the sustainability of fiscal policy and how different countries intend to treat their progeny. Recent generational accounting by the IMF and fiscal gap accounting by Kotlikoff claim to confirm the truly severe long-run fiscal problems facing the U.S.

=== The Auerbach-Kotlikoff Model ===
In the late 1970s, Kotlikoff, together with Berkeley economist, Alan J. Auerbach, developed the first large-scale computable general equilibrium life-cycle model that can track the behavior, over time, of economies comprising large numbers of overlapping generations. The Auerbach-Kotlikoff model is widely used by economists to study the transition paths of closed as well as open economies as well as the dynamic impact of fiscal and other policies.

A relatively recent incarnation of the Auerbach-Kotlikoff model is a paper by Hans Fehr, Sabine Jokisch, and Laurence Kotlikoff entitled "Dynamic Globalization and Its Potentially Alarming Prospects for Low-Wage Workers," includes five regions (the U.S., Europe, Japan, China, and India), six goods, region-specific fiscal policy and demographics, and the endogenous determination of the pattern of specialization.. The most recent use of the Auerbach-Kotlikoff model has been to study, together with economists Felix Kubler, Andrey Polbin, and Simon Scheidegger, the economics of carbon change, particularly the optimal uniformly welfare-improving carbon-tax policy. This is the carbon tax cum side payments that produces the highest uniform welfare gain for all current and future generations in all regions of the world.

=== The general relativity of fiscal language ===
In 1984, Kotlikoff wrote a fundamental paper entitled "Deficit Delusion", which appeared in The Public Interest. This was the first of a series of papers and books (see, e.g., Generational Accounting and Generational Policy) by Kotlikoff, including work with co-authors, showing, via examples, that in economic models featuring rational agents, "the" deficit is a figment of language, not economics. I.e., the deficit is not economically well defined. Instead, what governments measure as "the" deficit is entirely a result of the language they use to label government receipts and payments.

If the government calls a receipt a "tax," this lowers the reported deficit. If, instead, it calls the receipt "borrowing," it raises the reported deficit. Thus, if you give the government, say, $1,000 this year, it can say it is taxing you $1,000 this year. Alternatively, it can say it is borrowing $1,000 from you this year and will be taxing you in, say, five years the $1,000 plus accrued interest and using this future tax to pay you the principal plus interest due in the future on the current borrowing. With one set of words the deficit is $1,000 larger this year than with the other set of words.

If it so chose, the government could say it was taxing you $1,000 this year and also, this year, borrowing $1 trillion from you for, say, five years, making a transfer payment to you this year of $1 trillion, and taxing you in five years an amount equal to principal plus interest on the $1 trillion and using it to pay principal plus interest on the $1 trillion it is now borrowing. With this alternative choice of words, the reported deficit is $1 trillion larger than with the first set of words. But in all three examples, you hand over $1,000 this year and receive and pay zero on net in the future.

Einstein taught us that neither time, nor distance are well-defined physical concepts. Instead, their measurement is relative to our frame of reference – how fast we were traveling in the universe and in what direction. Our physical frame of reference can be viewed as our language or labeling convention. Einstein showed that neither time nor distance were well-defined concepts, but could be measured in an infinite number of ways. The same is true of the deficit. Just like absolute time and distance are not well defined, the deficit and related conventional fiscal measures has no economic meaning.

Kotlikoff, along with Harvard's Jerry Green, offered a general proof of the proposition that deficits and a number of other conventional fiscal measures are, economically speaking, content-free, concluding that the deficit is simply an arbitrary figment of language in all economic models involving rational agents.

Such models can feature all manner of individual and aggregate uncertainty, incomplete markets, distortionary fiscal policy, asymmetric information, borrowing constraints, time-inconsistent government policy, and a host of other problems, yet "the" deficit will still bear no theoretical connection to real policy-induced economic outcomes. The reason, again, is that there is no single deficit, but rather an infinity of deficit or surplus policy paths that can be announced (by the government or any private agent) simply by choosing the "right" fiscal labels.

==== Frames of reference ====
According to Kotlikoff, using the deficit as a guide to fiscal policy is like driving in Los Angeles with a map of New York City. For unlike in our physical world in which we are all using the same language (have the same frame of reference), in the world of economics, we are each free to adopt our own frame of reference – our own labeling convention. Thus, if Joe wants to claim that the U.S. federal government ran enormous surpluses for the last 50 years, he can simply choose appropriate words to label historic receipts and payments to produce that time series.

If Sally wishes to claim the opposite, there are words she can find to justify her view of the past stance of fiscal policy. And if Sam wishes to claim that that economy has experienced fluctuations from deficits to surpluses of arbitrary magnitude from year to year, he can do so. Language is extremely flexible. And there is nothing in economic theory that pins down how we discuss economic theory.

Kotlikoff and Green claim that fiscal variables in all mathematical economic models involving rational agents can be labeled freely and tell us nothing about the models themselves (no more than does choosing to discuss the models in French or English), and this means that the multitudinous econometric studies relating well-defined economic variables, such as interest rates or aggregate personal consumption, to "the" deficit are, economically speaking, content free.

According to Kotlikoff, the deficit is not the only variable that is not well defined. An economy's aggregate tax revenue, its aggregate transfer payments, its disposable income, its personal and private saving rates, and its level of private wealth – all are non-economic concepts that have, from the perspective of economic theories with rational agents, no more purchase on economic reality than does the emperor's clothes in Hans Christian Andersen's famous children's story.

Kotlikoff chose the title of his paper with Green not to suggest in the slightest any comparison of intellect with Einstein, but rather because of what seemed to him to be a strikingly similar message about confusing linguistics for substance. An example here is the definition of a capitalistic economy as one in which capital is primarily owed by the private sector. Kotlikoff claims that an economy that is described as having predominately privately owned wealth can just as well be described as one in which wealth is predominantly or, for that matter, entirely state-owned. Hence, "deficit delusion" implies that economic theory offers no precise measure/definition of capitalism, socialism, or communism.

=== Intergenerational altruism ===
Kotlikoff has done work testing intergenerational altruism – the proposition that current generations care about their descendants enough to ensure that government redistribution from their descendants to themselves will be offset by private redistribution back to the descendants either in the form of bequests or inter vivos gifts. This proposition dates to David Ricardo, who raised it as a theoretical, but empirically irrelevant proposition.

In 1974, Robert Barro revived "Ricardian Equivalence" by showing in a simple, elegant framework that each generation's caring about its children leads current generations to be altruistically linked to all their descendants. Hence, a government policy of transferring resources to current older generations at a cost to generations born, say, in 100 years would induce the current elderly to simply increase their gifts and bequests to their children who would pass the resources onward until it reached those born in 100 years.

This inter-linkage of current and future generations devolves into a mathematical model which is isomorphic to one in which all agents are infinitely lived (i.e., they act as if they live for ever in so far as their progeny are front and center in their preferences). The infinitely-lived model was originally posited by Frank Ramsey in the 1920s. Its aggregation properties make it very convenient for teaching macro economics because one does not have to deal with the messiness of upwards of 100 overlapping generations acting independently, but also interdependently. Consequently, it has become a mainstay in graduate macroeconomics training and underlies the work by Economics Nobel Laureate Ed Prescott and other economists on Real Business Cycle models.

Kotlikoff's singly and jointly authored work in the 1980s and 1990 called this model into question on both theoretical and empirical grounds. In a paper entitled "Altruistic Linkages within the Extended Family: A Note (1983)," which appears in Kotlikoff's 1989 MIT Press book What Determines Savings? Kotlikoff showed that when agents take each other's transfers as given, marriage generates intergenerational linkages between unrelated individuals.

I.e., if you, Steve, are altruistic toward your daughter, Sue, and your daughter marries John, who is altruistically linked to his father Ed, who has a daughter Sara who is altruistic toward her husband David, who cares about his sister Ida, who cares about her father-in-law Frank, you Steve are altruistically linked to Frank. Furthermore, if Frank loses a dollar and you gain a dollar, Barro's model implies that you Steve will take your newfound dollar and hand it to Frank. Kyle Bagwell and Douglas Bernheim independently reached Kotlikoff's conclusion, namely that the Barro model had patently absurd implications.

Together with Assaf Razin and Robert Rosenthal, Kotlikoff showed in [4] that dropping the unrealistic assumption that transfers are taken as given and permitting individuals to refuse transfers (e.g., refusing your mother's offer of an extra helping of cabbage) invalidates Barro's proposition of Ricardian Equivalence. I.e., they showed that Barro's model was a combination of a plausible set of preferences (altruism toward one's children) and an implausible assumption about the game being played by donors and donees.

In a series of empirical papers with Stanford economist Michael Boskin, University of Pennsylvania economist Andrew Abel, Yale economist Joseph Altonji, and Tokyo University economist Fumio Hayashi, Kotlikoff and his co-authors showed that there was little, if any, empirical support for Barro's very special model of intergenerational altruism.

=== Generational redistribution ===
In life-cycle models without operative intergenerational altruism, the young are the big savers because of every dollar they receive, they save a larger percentage than do the elderly for the simple reason that the elderly are closer to the ends of their lives and want to use it before they lose it. The unborn are, of course, the biggest savers because giving them an extra dollar (that they will be able to collect with interest when they arrive) leads them to consume nothing more in the present because they aren't yet alive.

So taking from the young and unborn and giving to the elderly should lead to a decline in national saving. In a 1996 paper with Jagadeesh Gokhale and John Sablehaus, Kotlikoff showed that the ongoing massive redistribution from young and future savers to old savers was responsible for the postwar decline in U.S. saving.

Notwithstanding his many studies overturning Ricardian Equivalence, on both theoretical and empirical grounds, Kotlikoff has a paper showing why intergenerational transfers may have no impact on the economy in a world of purely selfish life-cycle agents. The argument presented is simple. Once younger generations have been maximally exploited by older generations (who are assumed to have the ability to redistribute from the young to themselves), older generations can no longer extract resources for free, meaning they can no longer leave higher fiscal burdens for future generations without handing over a quid pro quo. At such an extreme, intergenerational transfers, per se, are no longer feasible because the young will refuse to accept them.

== Policy reform proposals ==
Kotlikoff has written that the economic future is bleak for the United States without tax reform, health care reform, and Social Security reform in his book The Coming Generational Storm and other publications.

=== Taxes ===
Kotlikoff has been a supporter of the FairTax proposal as a replacement for the federal tax code, contributing to research of plan's effects and the required rate for revenue neutrality. In 2010, Kotlikoff offered his own tax proposal, titled the Purple Tax (a blend of red and blue), a consumption levy that he says cleans up some problems with the FairTax.

His plan calls for a 15% final (17.5% nominal) sales tax. The FICA tax ceiling is gone and the 7.65% of the employees contribution is applied on everything after $40,000 but the employer pays 7.65% on the employees entire salary.

=== Finance ===
Kotlikoff's proposed reform of the financial system, discussed in Jimmy Stewart Is Dead, called Limited Purpose Banking, transforms all financial companies with limited liability, including incorporated banks, insurance companies, financial exchanges, and hedge funds, into pass-through mutual funds, which do not borrow to invest in risky assets, but, instead, allows the public to directly choose what risks it wishes to bear by purchasing more or less risky mutual funds. According to Kotlikoff, Limited Purpose Banking keeps banks, insurance companies, hedge funds and other financial corporations from borrowing short and lending long, which leaves the public to pick up the pieces when things go south. Instead, Kotlikoff argues Limited Purpose Banking forces financial intermediaries to limit their activities to their sole legitimate purpose—financial inter-mediation. It would substitute the vast array of extant federal and state financial regulatory bodies with a single financial regulator called the Federal Financial Authority (FFA), which would have a narrow purpose namely to verify, disclose, and oversee the independent rating and custody off all securities purchased and sold by mutual funds.

=== Healthcare ===
In his 2007 book, The Healthcare Fix, Kotlikoff proposed a major reform of the U.S. healthcare system, a "Medical Security System", subsequently dubbed "The Purple Health Plan", that would do away with Medicare, Medicaid, employer-based healthcare, and health exchanges established under the Affordable Care Act. In their place, every American would receive a voucher for a basic health insurance policy, whose coverages would be established by a panel of doctors such that the total cost of all vouchers remained within a fixed share, e.g., 10 percent, of GDP. The voucher would be provided by the government at no cost and its amount would be individually risk-adjusted, i.e., sicker people would receive larger vouchers. No health insurance company providing the basic insurance plan could turn anyone away and those who could afford supplemental health insurance plans would be free to purchase them.

According to Kotlikoff, the plan provides universal basic health insurance, retains private provision of healthcare, limits government healthcare spending to a fixed share of GDP, and avoids adverse selection. Kotlikoff has denounced critics of the plan such as economist Paul Krugman and President Obama for demagoguery over word voucher—arguing that the current health care law relies on vouchers. He argues that the current Medicare program is unsustainable and that we have no choice but to embrace a plan with vouchers. In order to highlight his Purple Plans, Kotlikoff ran for the nomination of the Americans Elect platform in its short-lived effort to field a third-party candidate in the 2012 Presidential election.

== Political parties ==
Kotlikoff fervently dislikes both major political parties and has called for a third party. In January 2012, Kotlikoff announced his plans to run as a third party candidate for President of the United States in 2012. Kotlikoff said he would seek the presidential nomination of the non-partisan advocacy group Americans Elect. He announced in May that he would also seek the nomination of the Reform Party of the United States, but ended the bid after the Americans Elect board decided to not field a 2012 presidential ticket.

In the 2016 Presidential Election, Kotlikoff ran as a registered, write-in candidate. He was defeated by Republican candidate Donald Trump.

== Other ventures ==
Kotlikoff is the President of Economic Security Planning, Inc., a company that markets MaxiFi Planner, an economics-based personal financial planning software program, and "Maximize My Social Security", a software program that helps Americans decide which Social Security benefits to take and when, to get the highest lifetime benefits.

== Books ==
- The Economic Consequences of the Vickers Commission, Civitas, 2012.
- The Clash of Generations, (with Scott Burns), MIT Press, 2012.
- Jimmy Stewart is Dead – Ending the World's Ongoing Financial Plague with Limited Purpose Banking. John Wiley and Sons, 2010.
- Spend 'Til the End – The Revolutionary Guide to Raising Your Living Standard, Today and When You Retire. Simon & Schuster, (with Scott Burns), 2008.
- The Healthcare Fix – Universal Insurance for All Americans, MIT Press, 2007.
- The Coming Generational Storm, (with Scott Burns), MIT Press, 2004.
- Generational Policy, The 2002 Caroli Lectures, MIT Press, 2003.
- Essays on Saving, Bequests, Altruism, and Life-Cycle Planning, MIT Press, 2001.
- Generational Accounting Around the World, co-edited with Alan Auerbach and Willi Leibfritz, NBER volume, University of Chicago Press, 1999.
- Macroeconomics: An Integrated Approach Second Edition, (with Alan Auerbach), MIT Press, 1998.
- Macroeconomics: An Integrated Approach (with Alan Auerbach), Southwestern Publishing Co., 1994.
- Generational Accounting, The Free Press, 1992.
- What Determines Savings, MIT Press, 1989.
- The Wage Carrot and the Pension Stick: Retirement Benefits and Labor Force Participation (with David Wise), The W. E. Upjohn Institute for Employment Research, 1989.
- Dynamic Fiscal Policy (with Alan Auerbach), Cambridge University Press, 1987.
- Pensions in the American Economy (with Daniel Smith), University of Chicago Press, 1983.
- Get What's Yours: The Secrets to Maxing Out Your Social Security (with Philip Moeller and Paul Solman), Simon and Schuster, 2015.
