= Roman Vorobey (footballer, born 1995) =

Ukrainian footballer

Personal information
- Full name: Roman Volodymyrovych Vorobey
- Date of birth: 7 June 1995 (age 31)
- Place of birth: Volyn Oblast, Ukraine
- Height: 1.88 m (6 ft 2 in)
- Position: Defender

Youth career
- 2007–2012: FC Volyn Lutsk

Senior career*
Years	Team	Apps	(Gls)
2012–2015	FC Volyn Lutsk	0	(0)
2016	FC Laska Boratyn (amateurs)	9	(4)
2017	FC ODEK Orzhiv (amateurs)	16	(0)
2017	FC Volyn Lutsk	14	(1)
- * Club domestic league appearances and goals as of 24 August 2017

Roman Vorobey (Ukrainian: Роман Володимирович Воробей; born 7 June 1995 in Volyn Oblast, Ukraine) is a Ukrainian football defender.

== Career ==
Vorobey is a product of his native FC Volyn Lutsk youth sportive school system.

He played in the Ukrainian Premier League Reserves for FC Volyn and the different Ukrainian amateur clubs. In August 2017, Vorobey signed again a contract with FC Volyn
