= Roman Vorobey (footballer, born 1994) =

Ukrainian footballer

Personal information
- Full name: Roman Valentynovych Vorobey
- Date of birth: 22 February 1994 (age 32)
- Place of birth: Chernihiv, Ukraine
- Height: 1.80 m (5 ft 11 in)
- Position: Midfielder

Youth career
- 2007–2011: Yunist Chernihiv

Senior career*
Years	Team	Apps	(Gls)
2012	Retro Vatutine (amateur)	9	(0)
2013	Slavia Mozyr	0	(0)
2014	Makhtaaral	7	(0)
2015	Skala Stryi	6	(0)
2015	Slavia Mozyr	0	(0)
2016	Inhulets-2 Petrove	12	(1)
2016	Hirnyk-Sport Komsomolsk	9	(1)
2017	Real Pharma Odesa	4	(0)
2017–2019	Polonia Przemyśl		
2019–2020	Unia Tarnów		
2020	Belshina Bobruisk	1	(0)
- * Club domestic league appearances and goals as of 31 December 2020

Roman Vorobey (Ukrainian: Роман Валентинович Воробей; born 22 February 1994) is a Ukrainian former football midfielder.

== Career ==
Vorobey is a product of his native Chernihiv's Yunist Chernihiv youth sportive school system.

He played in the different Ukrainian amateur and Second League clubs. In March 2015 Vorobey signed a contract with FC Skala and in July 2015 returned in the Belarusian Premier League club FC Slavia Mozyr.
