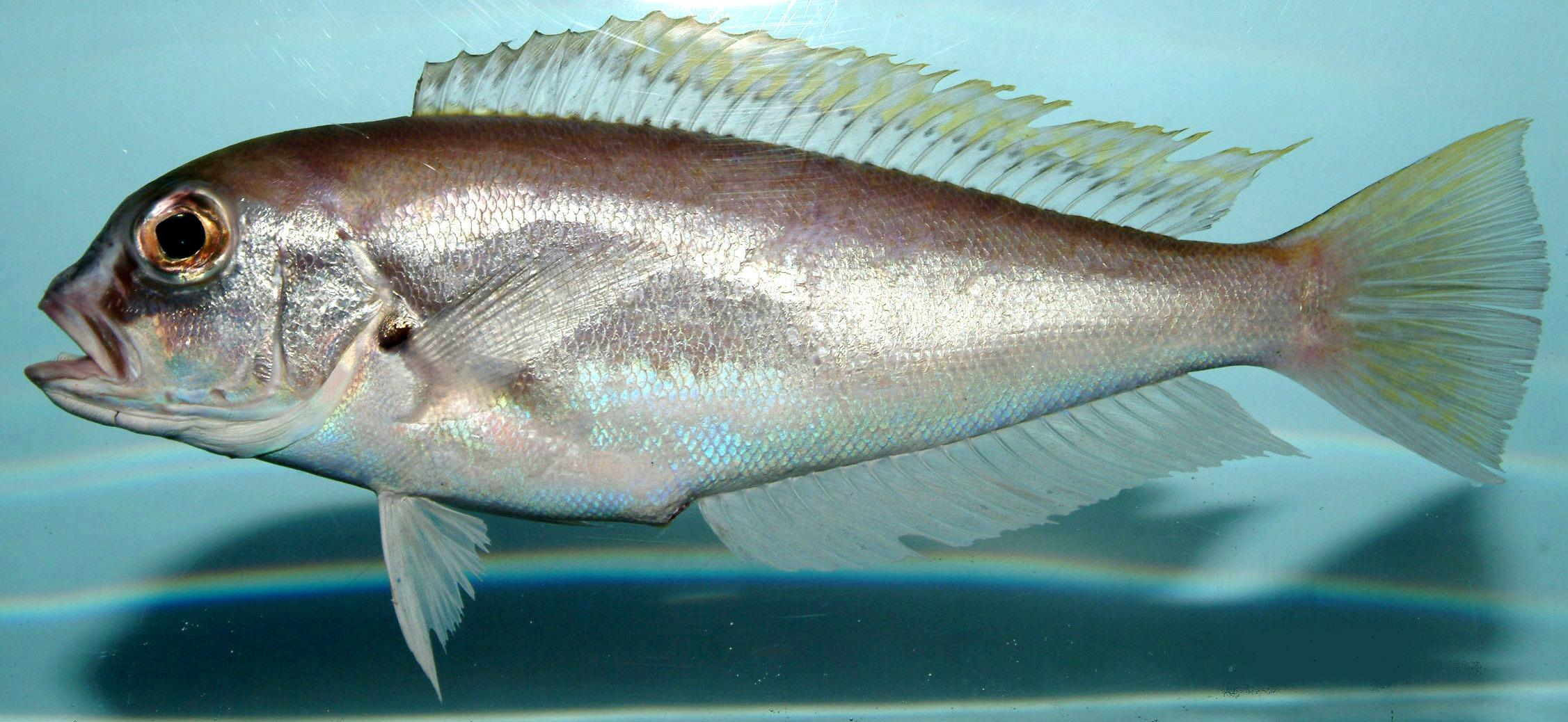

Conservation status
- Least Concern (IUCN 3.1)

Scientific classification
- Kingdom: Animalia
- Phylum: Chordata
- Class: Actinopterygii
- Order: Acanthuriformes
- Family: Latilidae
- Genus: Caulolatilus
- Species: C. intermedius

Binomial name
- Caulolatilus intermedius Howell-Rivero, 1936

= Gulf bareye tilefish =

Species of fish

The Gulf bareye tilefish (Caulolatilus intermedius), also known as the anchor tilefish, is a species of marine ray-finned fish, a tilefish belonging to the family Malacanthidae. It occurs in the western Atlantic Ocean.

== Description ==
The Gulf bareye tilefish has a sturdy, quadrangular body with a relatively deep head which has a rounded profile and a small mouth extending to the front of the eye. There is a fleshy ridge along the centreline of the body in front of the dorsal fin. The gill cover has a short blunt spine and serrations along the vertical margin of the preoperculum. The back and upper flanks are pale purplish brown. The predorsal ridge is dark, with a dark half moon at its front. There is an angled bar which runs forward from the eye to the upper lips. The tip of the snout is dark. There is a small dark blotch over base of the pectoral fins. The dorsal fin has a dark base, whitish middle and wide dusky stripe on the margin. The anal fin is opaline. The dorsal fin contains 7 spines and 24-25, occasionally 26, soft rays while the anal fin has 1 or 2 spines and 22-23 soft rays. This species attains a maximum total length of 60 cm (24 in) but 20 cm (7.9 in) is a more common length.

== Distribution ==
The Gulf bareye tilefish is found in the Western Atlantic Ocean. It is endemic to the waters of the Gulf of Mexico. Its range extends from the Florida Panhandle west and south along the coasts of the United States and Mexico to the Yucatán Peninsula. There is a single record from northwestern Cuba, records from northern South America are thought to be misidentifications.

== Habitat and biology ==
The Gulf bareye tilefish is found at depths between 45 and 290 m (148 and 951 ft), typically over mud substrates. It is the most common tilefish in the northern Gulf of Mexico. It occurs near the edge of the continental shelf and around the heads of canyons.

== Systematics ==
The Gulf bareye tilefish was first formally described in 1936 by the Cuban biologist Luis Howell-Rivero (1899-1986) with the type locality given as Havana. The specific name refers to the size of this species, intermediate between C. chrysops, C. cyanops and C. microps.

== Utilisation ==
The Gulf bareye tilefish is not the target of a commercial fishery, it is taken as bycatch by fisheries targeting other species. It is normally sold fresh.
