= Torpedo Wharf =

Popular wharf in California

Fort Point Pier
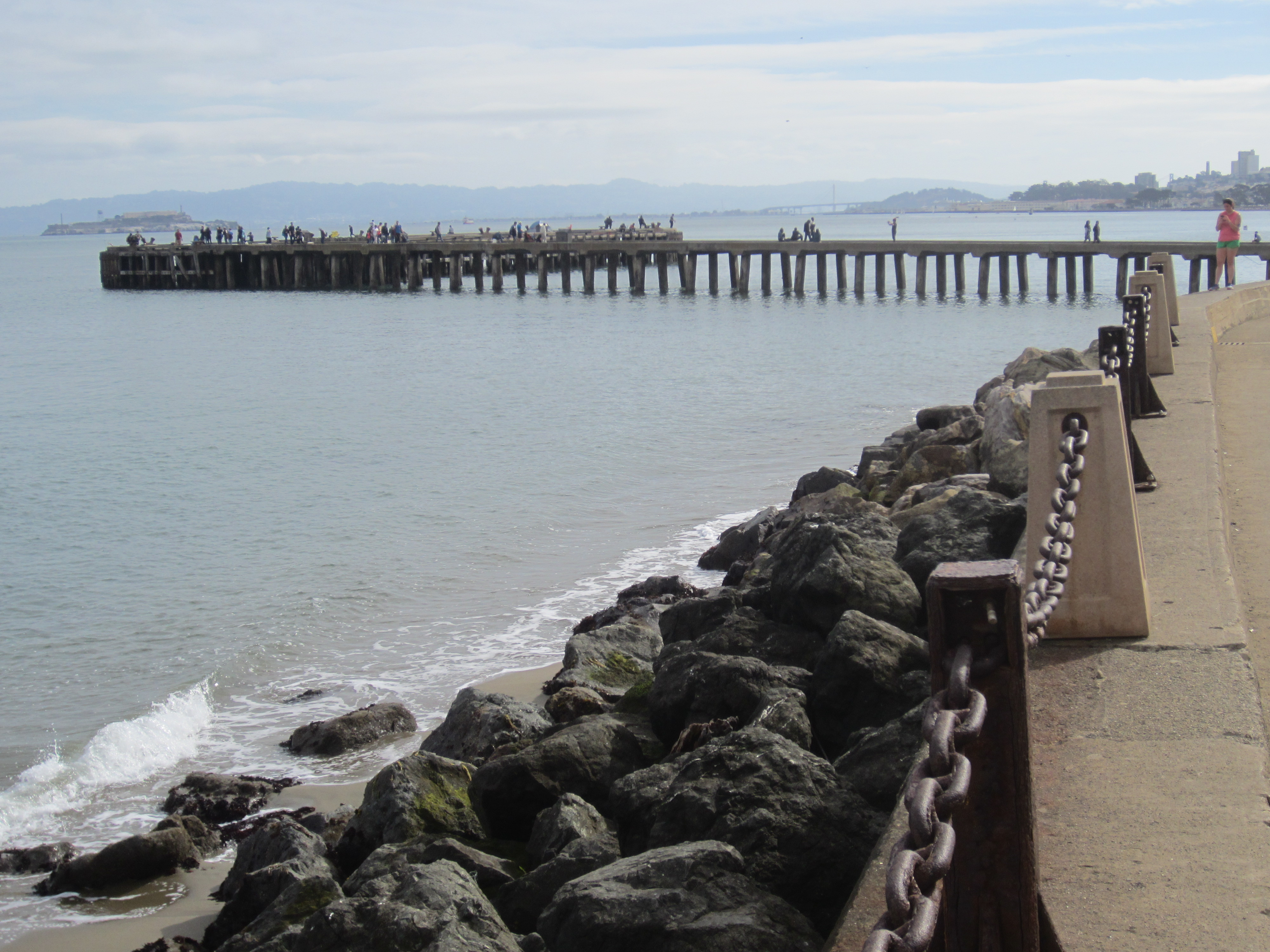
- The wharf in 2018
- Type: Fishing Pier
- Spans: San Francisco Bay
- Location: San Francisco, California
- Coordinates: 37.809275°N 122.469793°W
- Official name: Torpedo Wharf
- Maintained by: National Park Service
- Toll: Open to the Public

History
- Designer: Concrete
- Opening date: 1854

Torpedo Wharf is a wharf in the Presidio of San Francisco, in the U.S. state of California. The site has been a wharf since 1854, and earned its current name when the United States Army built a naval mine depot c. 1907–1909. The current wharf was established in 1941, and now serves as a popular tourist destination.

== Fishing ==
Primary species caught at the pier:

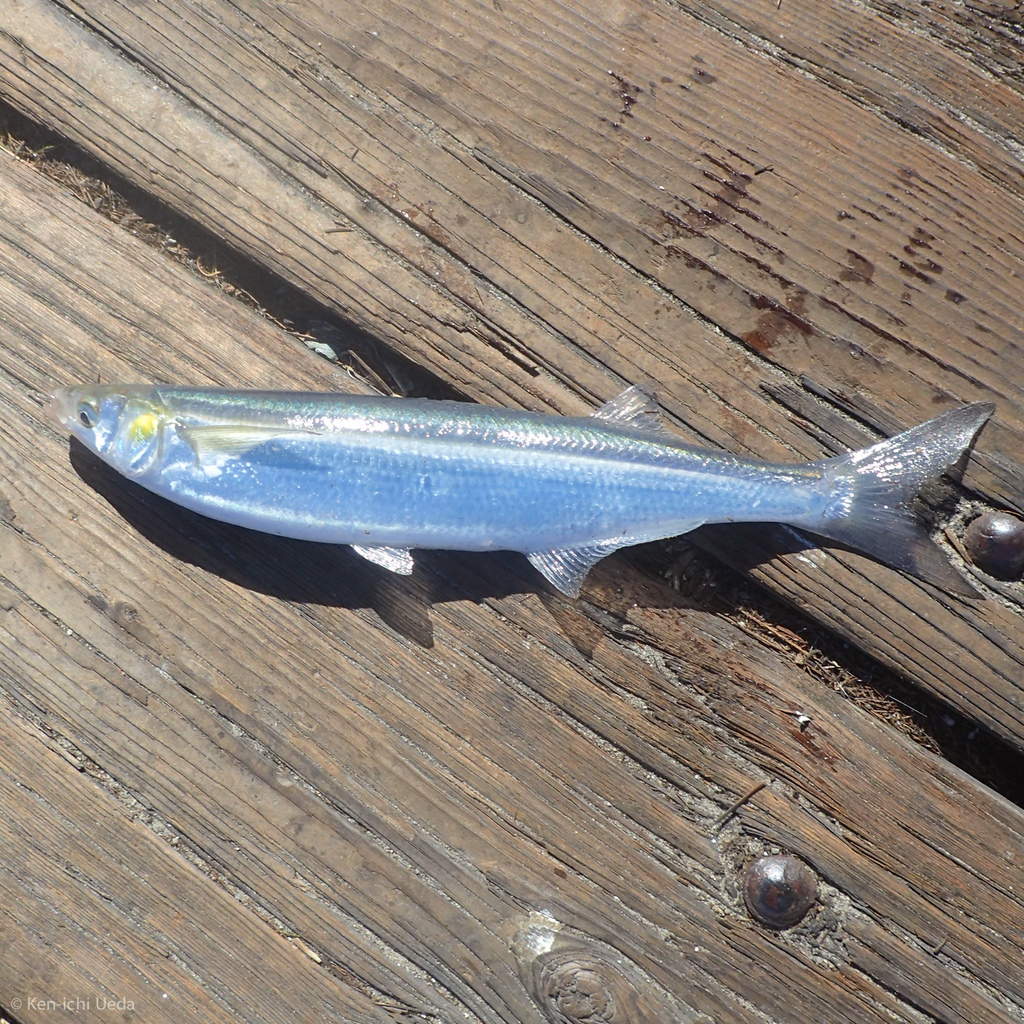
Jacksmelt

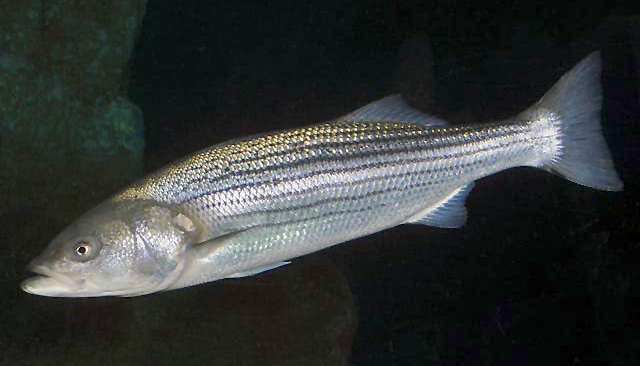
Striped Bass

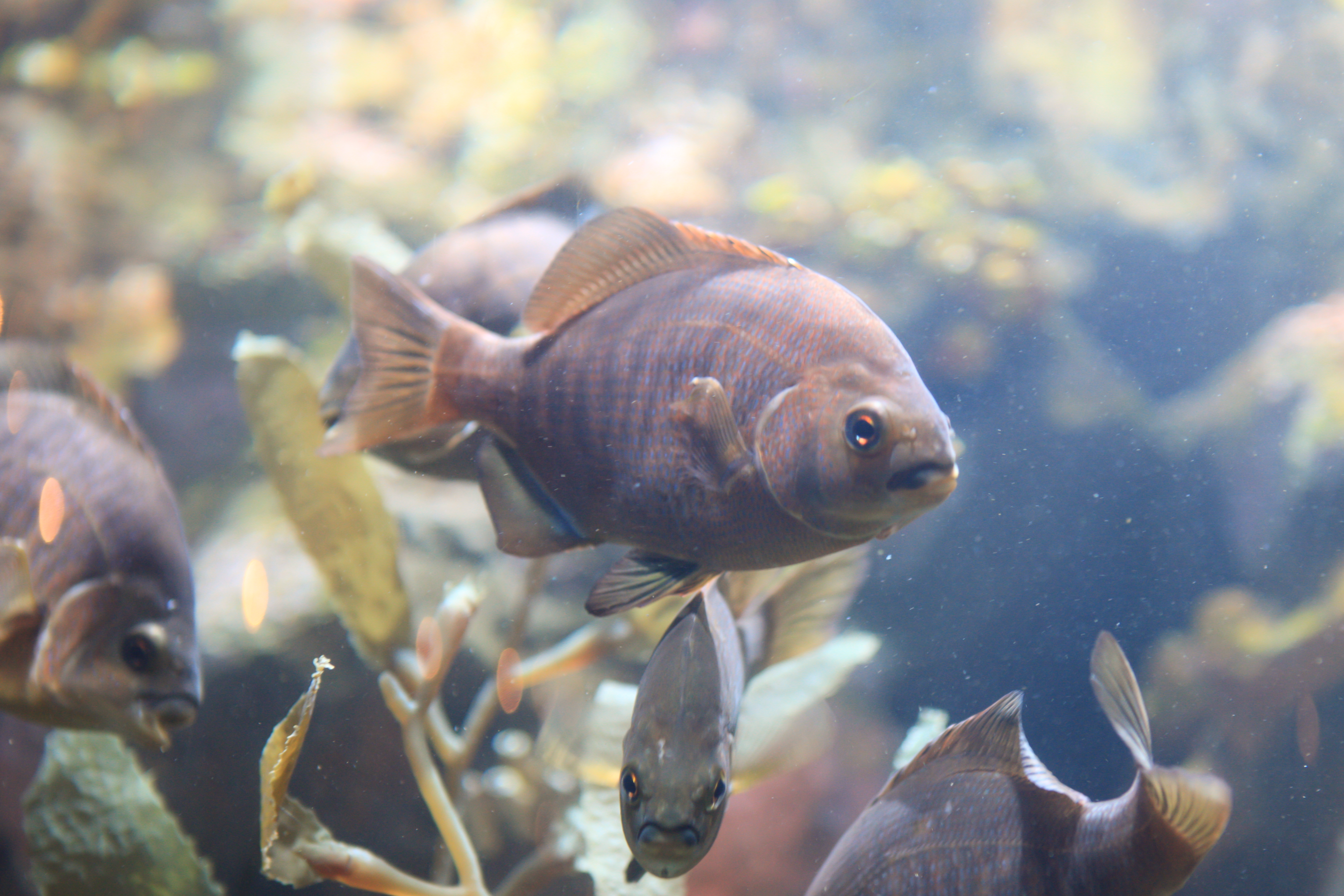
black surfperch

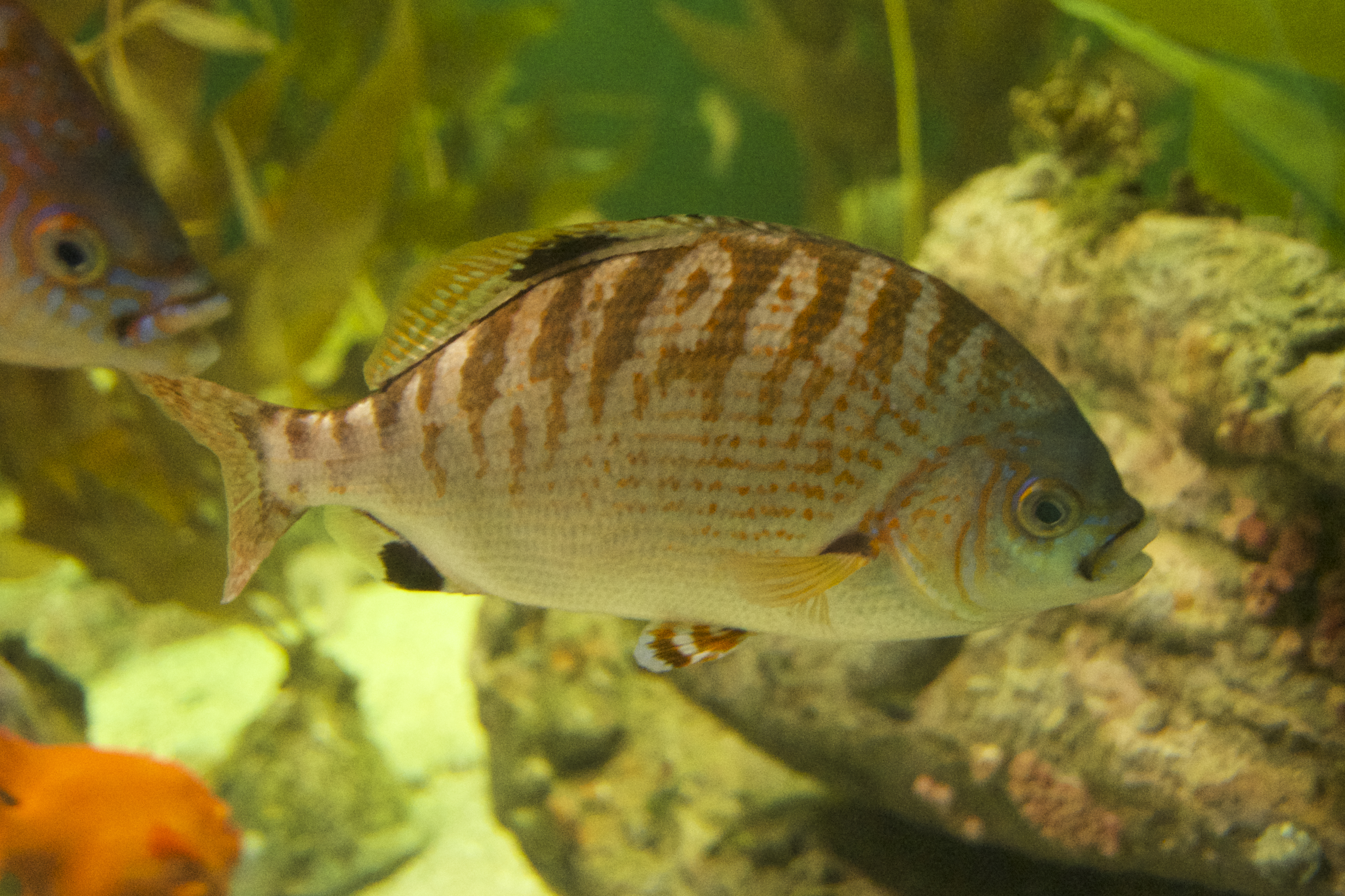
Rainbow surfperch

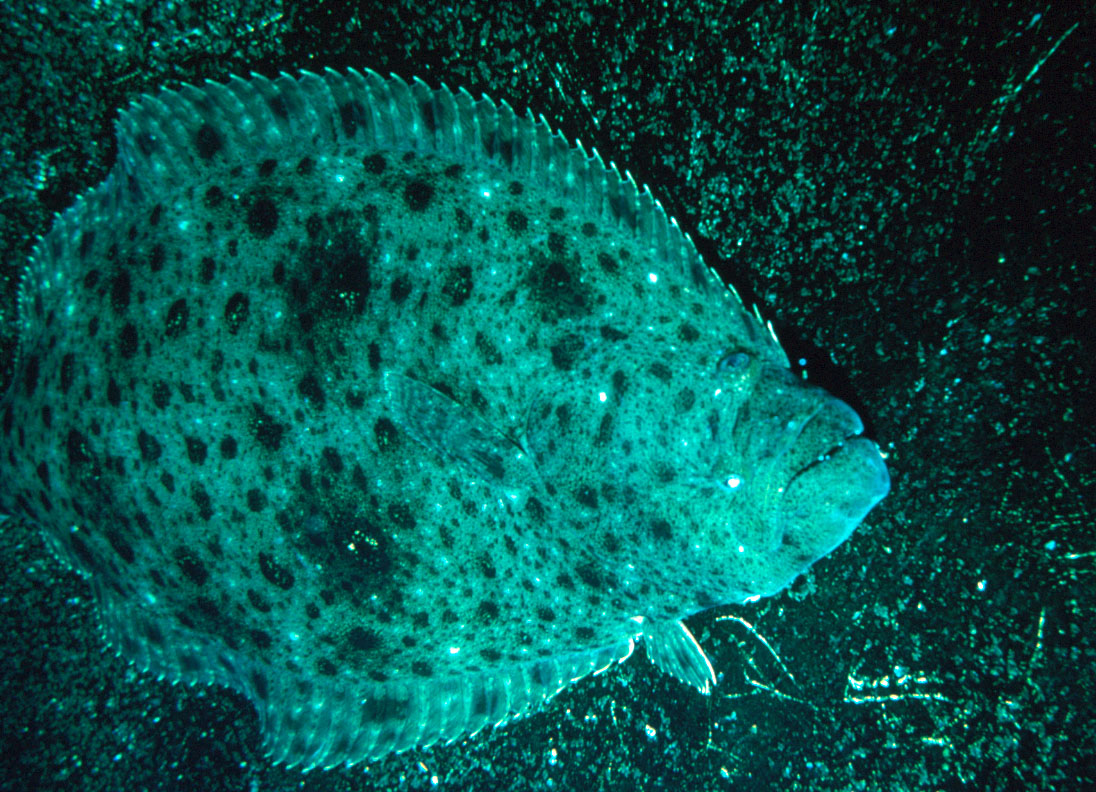
California halibut

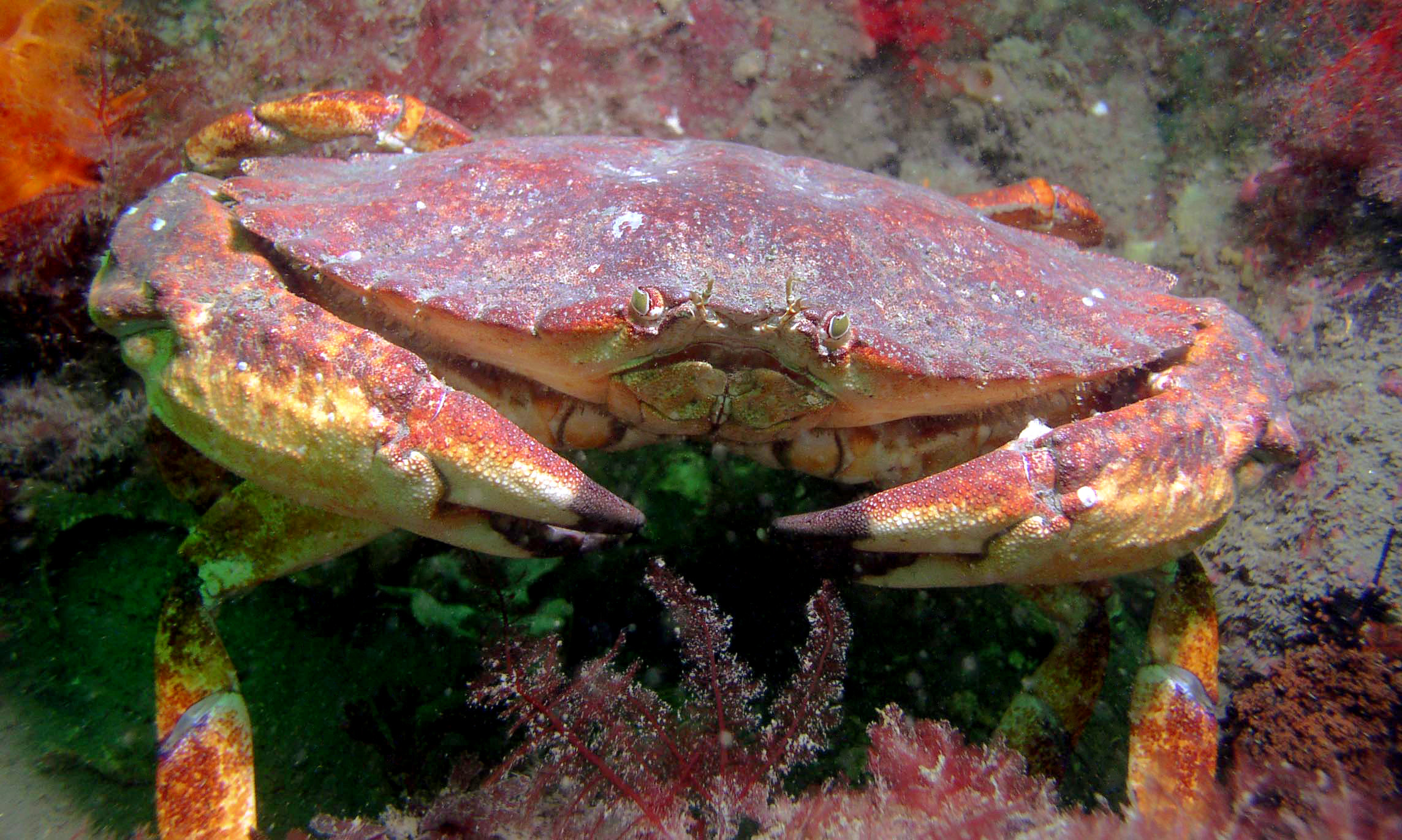
Red Rock Crab (Cancer productus)
