= Bugara =

Bugara may refer to:

- Bugara, also known as the rainbow surfperch, a species of fish found along the coast of California and Mexico
- USS Bugara (SS-331), a United States Navy submarine in commission from 1944 to 1970
