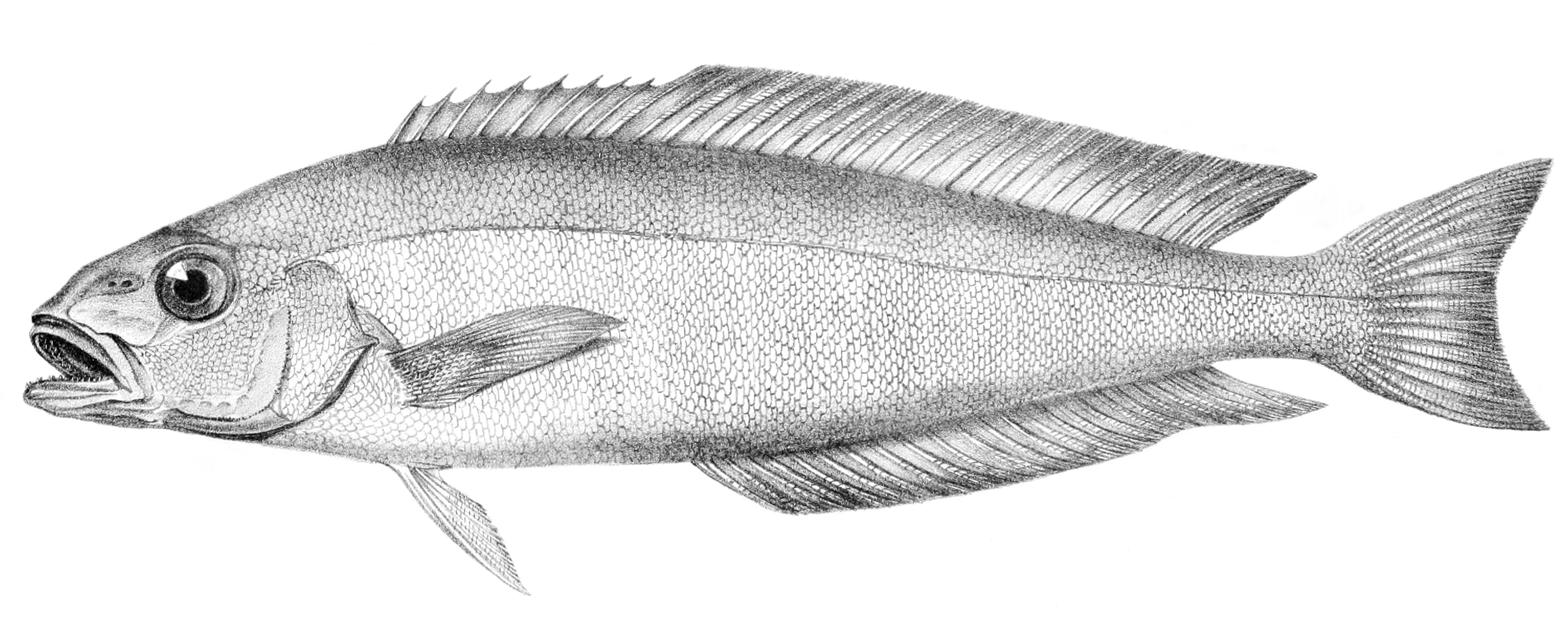

Conservation status
- Least Concern (IUCN 3.1)

Scientific classification
- Kingdom: Animalia
- Phylum: Chordata
- Class: Actinopterygii
- Division: Teleostei
- Order: Acanthuriformes
- Family: Latilidae
- Genus: Caulolatilus
- Species: C. princeps

Binomial name
- Caulolatilus princeps (Jenyns, 1840)

Synonyms
- Latilus princeps Jenyns, 1840; Dekaya anomala J. G. Cooper, 1863; Caulolatilus affinis Hildebrand, 1946

= Ocean whitefish =

Species of fish

The ocean whitefish (Caulolatilus princeps), also known as the ocean tilefish, is a species of marine ray-finned fish, belonging to the family Malacanthidae, the tilefishes. It is native to the Eastern Pacific Ocean. It may also be known as the blanquillo or whities.

== Taxonomy and etymology ==
The ocean whitefish was first formally described in 1840 as Latilus princeps by the English naturalist Leonard Jenyns (1800–1893). The type specimen was collected in the Galapagos by H.M.S. Beagle. The specific name princeps means "first" or "most important", the reason for the name was not explained but maybe because it was larger than its presumed congeners at the time Jenyns named it. Hubbs's tilefish (Caulolatilus hubbsi) was described as a new species from the Galápagos Islands in 1978 but since then studies have shown that it is not readily distinguishable from C. princeps and should be considered a junior synonym of this species.

== Description ==
The ocean whitefish has a sturdy, quadrangular body with a relatively deep head which has a steep profile and a small mouth extending to the front of the eye. There is a fleshy ridge along the centerline of the body in front of the dorsal fin. The gill cover has a short blunt spine while the preoperculum is serrated, and is quite sharp. The dorsal fin contains between 7 and 10, normally 9, spines and 24–27 soft rays while the anal fin has 1–3 spines and 22–26 soft rays. The overall color is pale brown with a white abdomen. The pectoral fins are colored greenish-blue and yellow while the dorsal fin is yellow.

This species can reach a length of 102 centimetres (40 in) total length. The greatest recorded weight for this species is 5.8 kilograms (13 lb), but most fish are under 3.6 kilograms (7.9 lb). The IGFA record lists the max size as a 7.74 kilograms (17.1 lb) caught in 2011.

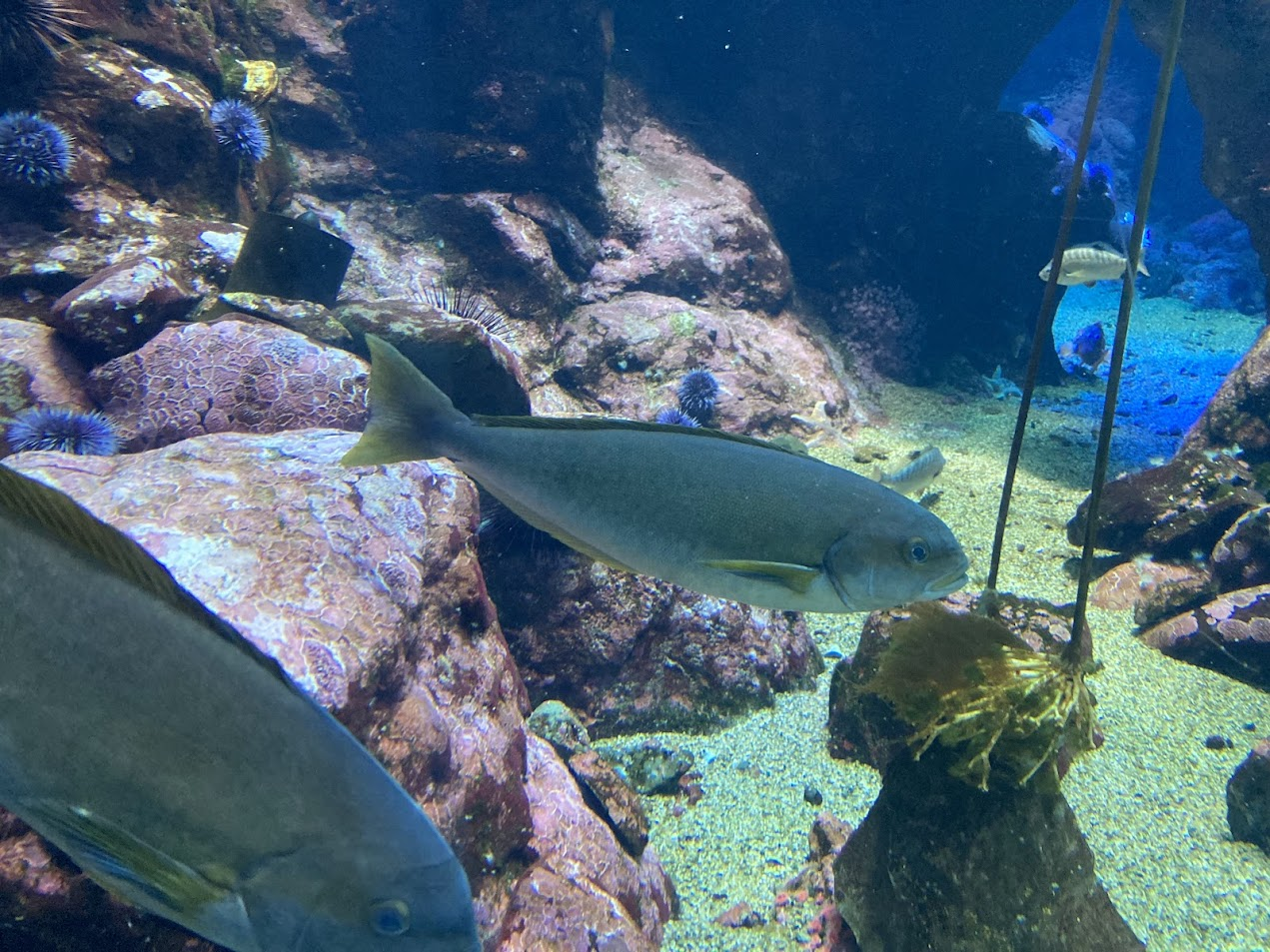
Two ocean whitefish with rainbow surfperch (Hypsurus caryi) in the background. Photographed at the California Academy of Sciences

== Distribution ==
The ocean whitefish is found in the eastern Pacific Ocean. Here it ranges from Southern British Columbia to Central Peru, possibly as far south as Northern Chile. It is also found at almost all of the Eastern Pacific archipelagos, except for Clipperton Island.

It prefers warmer waters and is most common on the banks and offshore islands of the coast of California, from Point Conception in Santa Barbara County south to Baja California in Mexico.

== Habitat and biology ==
The ocean whitefish is found at depths between 3 and 150 m (9.8 and 492.1 ft). It is found mainly over rocky substrates, but may also be encountered over sandy or muddy substrates. It is a solitary species which shelters during the night in kelp forests or in rocky reefs. It is a predatory fish which has a diet comprising crabs, shrimp, large krill, squid, anchovies, and lanternfish. The ocean whitefish also forages by digging into the substrate.

This species has an extended spawning season which runs from the late autumn into early spring. The eggs are fertilized externally, and the larvae live a pelagic lifestyle until growing larger and adapting a more demersal lifestyle. They are sexually mature at 3–5 years old and may live for 13 years.

The predators of the ocean whitefish include the giant sea bass (Stereolepis gigas), school shark (Galeorhinus galeus) and California sea lion (Zalophus californianus). Known parasites include the trematodes Choanodera caulolatili, Choricotyle caulolatili, Jaliscia caballeroi and Myzotus vitellosus.

== Relation to humans ==
The ocean whitefish is caught as bycatch off California by the groundfish commercial fishery using longline or hook and line tactics. It is also a popular fish for sport fishing. The taste of the meat has been regarded as good, with soft texture and small flakes, but the skin is recommended to be removed before cooking on account of it not tasting very good.
