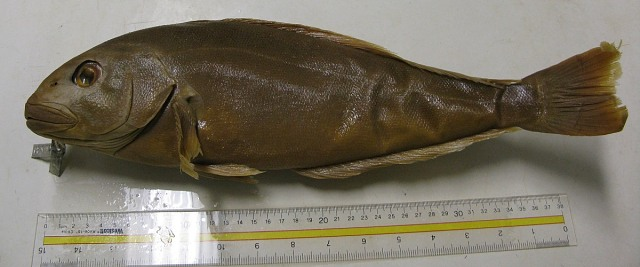

Conservation status
- Least Concern (IUCN 3.1)

Scientific classification
- Kingdom: Animalia
- Phylum: Chordata
- Class: Actinopterygii
- Order: Acanthuriformes
- Family: Latilidae
- Genus: Caulolatilus
- Species: C. hubbsi

Binomial name
- Caulolatilus hubbsi Dooley, 1978

= Caulolatilus hubbsi =

Species of ray-finned fish

Caulolatilus hubbsi, the Hubbs's tilefish, is a species of marine ray-finned fish, a tilefish belonging to the family Malacanthidae. It occurs in the eastern Pacific Ocean. Its specific name honours the American ichthyologist Carl Leavitt Hubbs (1894-1979). Studies have shown that this taxon is not readily distinguishable from Caulolatilus princeps and should be treated as a junior synonym of C. princeps.
