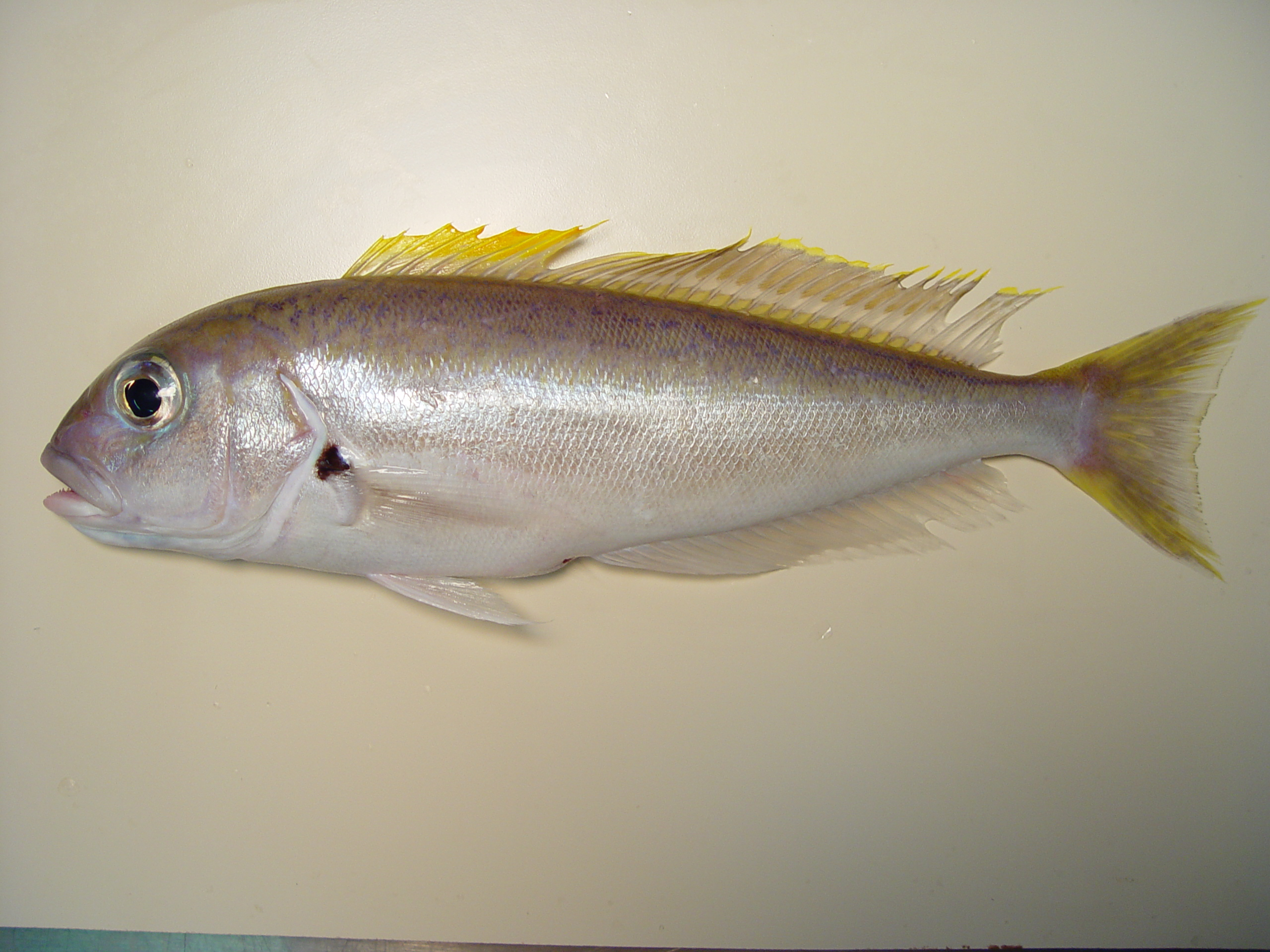
- Blackline Tilefish (C. cyanops)

Scientific classification
- Kingdom: Animalia
- Phylum: Chordata
- Class: Actinopterygii
- Division: Teleostei
- Order: Acanthuriformes
- Family: Latilidae
- Genus: Caulolatilus; T. N. Gill, 1862

Type species
- Latilus chrysops Valenciennes, 1833

Synonyms
- Dekaya J. G. Cooper, 1863

= Caulolatilus =

Genus of ray-finned fishes

Caulolatilus is a genus of tilefishes native to the Pacific and Atlantic coasts of the Americas. This genus is regarded as the least specialised of the tilefishes.

== Species ==
There are currently 11 recognized species in this genus:

- Caulolatilus affinis T. N. Gill, 1865 (Bighead tilefish)
- Caulolatilus bermudensis Dooley, 1981 (Bermuda tilefish)
- Caulolatilus chrysops (Valenciennes, 1833) (Atlantic goldeneye tilefish)
- Caulolatilus cyanops Poey, 1866 (Blackline tilefish)
- Caulolatilus dooleyi Berry, 1978 (Bankslope tilefish)
- Caulolatilus guppyi Beebe & Tee-Van, 1937 (Reticulated tilefish)
- Caulolatilus hubbsi Dooley, 1978 (Hubbs' tilefish)
- Caulolatilus intermedius Howell-Rivero, 1936 (Gulf bareye tilefish)
- Caulolatilus microps Goode & T. H. Bean, 1878 (Grey tilefish)
- Caulolatilus princeps (Jenyns, 1840) (Ocean whitefish)
- Caulolatilus williamsi Dooley & Berry, 1977 (Yellowbar tilefish)

Studies have shown that C. hubbsi is not readily distinguishable from C. princeps and should be treated as a junior synonym of the latter taxon.
