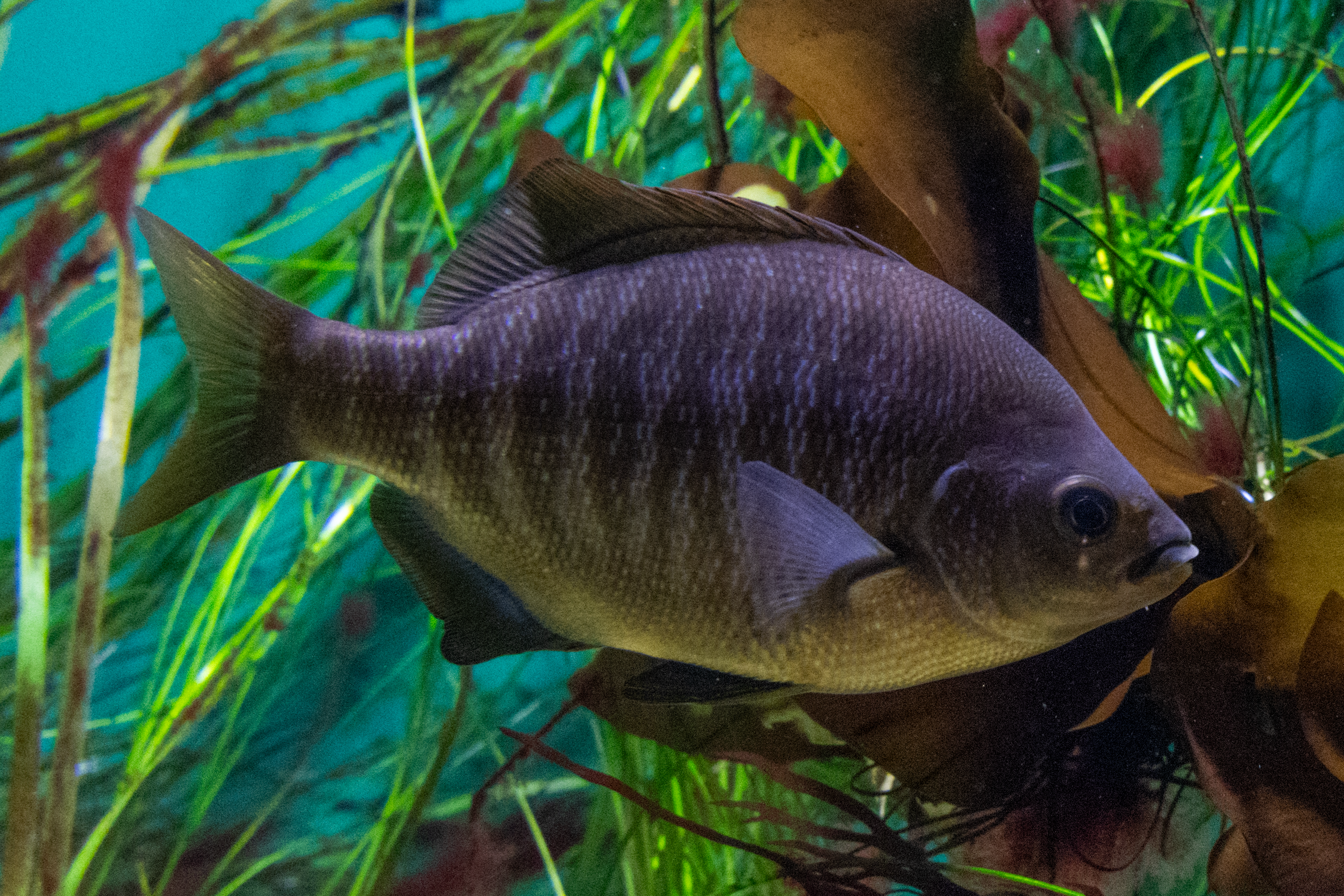
- Embiotoca jacksoni
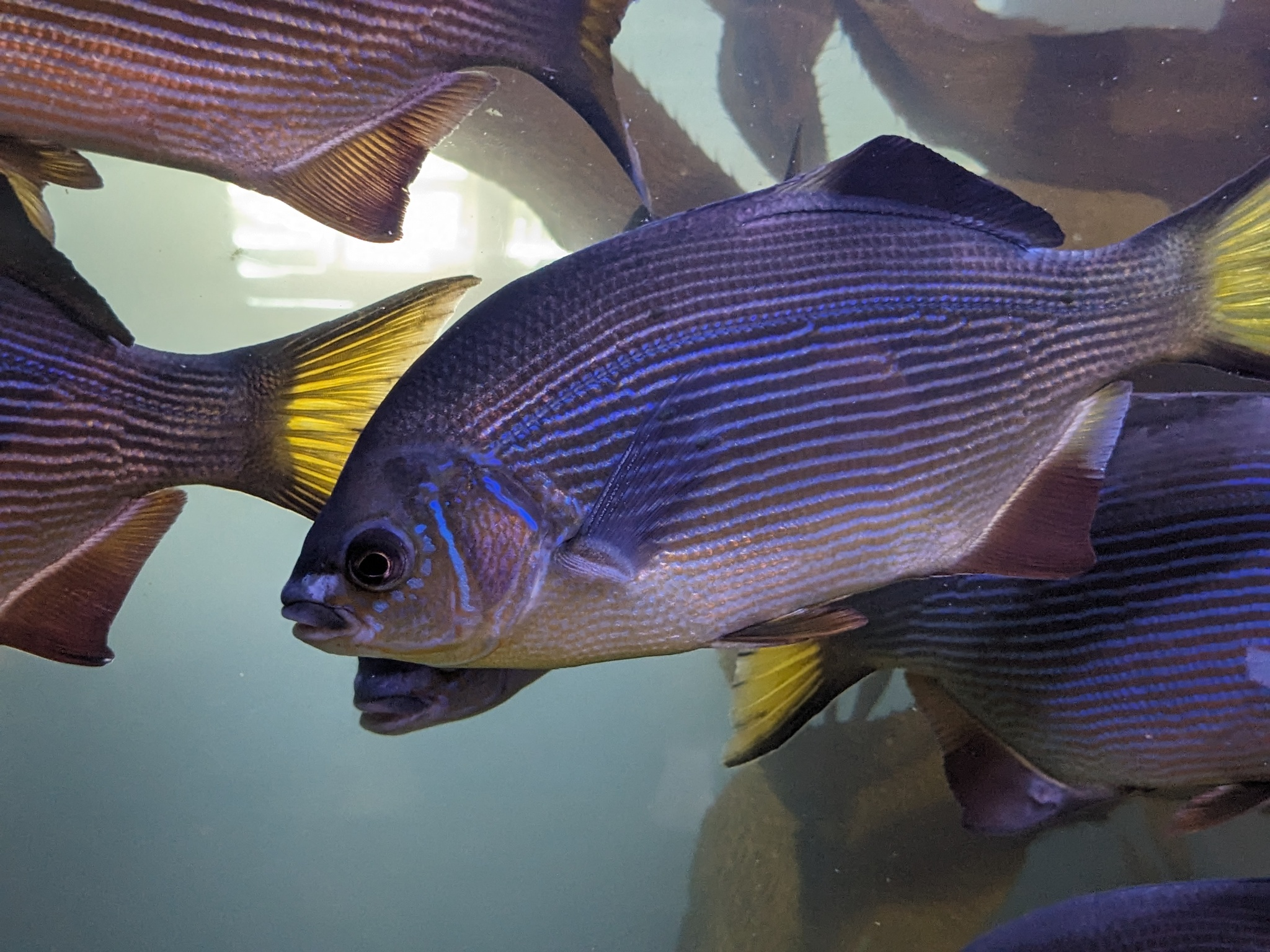
- Embiotoca lateralis

Scientific classification
- Kingdom: Animalia
- Phylum: Chordata
- Class: Actinopterygii
- Clade: Ovalentaria
- Order: Blenniiformes
- Family: Embiotocidae
- Genus: Embiotoca; Agassiz, 1853

Type species
- Embiotoca jacksoni Agassiz, 1853

= Embiotoca =

Genus of fishes

Embiotoca is a genus of surfperches native to the eastern Pacific Ocean.

== Species ==
There are currently two recognized species in this genus:

Species	Common name	Image
Embiotoca jacksoni Agassiz, 1853	Black surfperch	
Embiotoca lateralis Agassiz, 1854	Striped surfperch	
