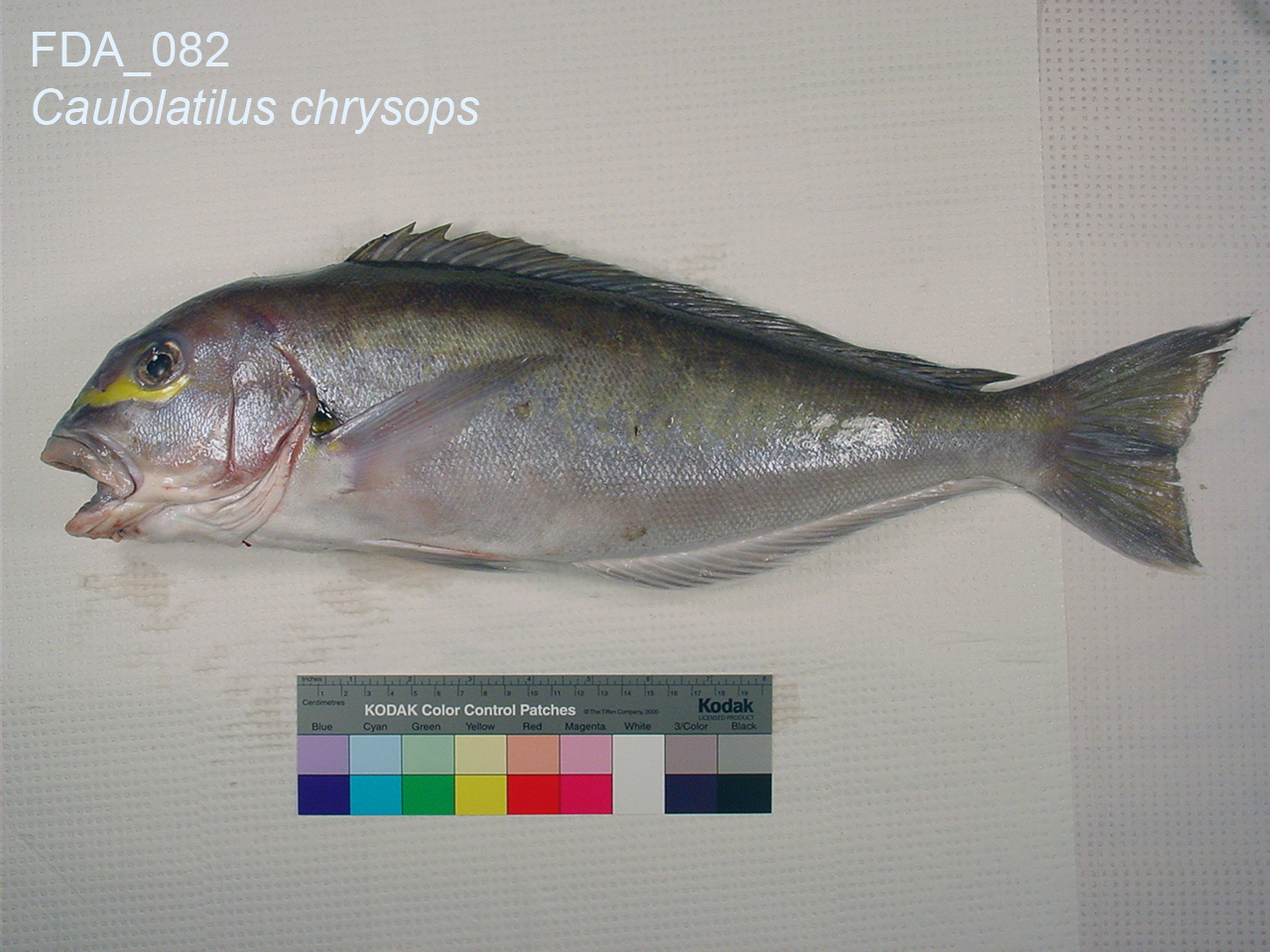

Conservation status
- Least Concern (IUCN 3.1)

Scientific classification
- Kingdom: Animalia
- Phylum: Chordata
- Class: Actinopterygii
- Order: Acanthuriformes
- Family: Latilidae
- Genus: Caulolatilus
- Species: C. chrysops

Binomial name
- Caulolatilus chrysops (Valenciennes, 1833)

Synonyms
- Latilus chrysops Valenciennes, 1833

= Caulolatilus chrysops =

Species of fish

Caulolatilus chrysops, the Atlantic goldeneye tilefish or gold face tilefish, is a species of marine ray-finned fish, a tilefish belonging to the family Malacanthidae. It occurs in the western Atlantic Ocean.

== Description ==
Caulolatilus chrysops has a sturdy, quadrangular body with a relatively deep head which has a rounded profile. There is a fleshy ridge along the centreline of the body in front of the dorsal fin. The gill cover has a short blunt spine and serrations along its vertical margin. It has a violet body with a pale yellow tint on the back and upper flanks, the lower flanks have a silvery sheen, becoming pearly white on the abdomen. The fleshy predorsal ridge is not pigmented. There is a wide, vivid yellow streak running from beneath the eye to just above the nostrils with a bright blue line beneath this. The iris is golden. The dorsal fin has a whitish base with the rest of the fin being mottled grey and yellow with a white margin. There is a black blotch above the pectoral fin which has a yellow inner base. The anal fin has an indistinct dusky band in its centre on a pearly white background colour. The caudal fin is marked with small yellow spots. The dorsal fin contains 7 or 8, occasionally 6, spines and 23–27 soft rays while the anal fin has 1 or 2 spines, the first spine being reduced, and 20–26 soft rays. This species attains a maximum total length of 60 cm (24 in) but 44 cm (17 in) is a more common length.

== Distribution ==
Caulolatilus chrysops is found in the Western Atlantic Ocean. It occurs as far north as North Carolina and southwards through the Gulf of Mexico. It is absent from much of the Caribbean but occurs along the northern coast of South America from Venezuela to Rio de Janeiro.

== Habitat and biology ==
Caulolatilus chrysops is found near the bottom, at depths from 90 to 131 m (295 to 430 ft), where it has been recorded on a substrate consisting of a rubble of shell and coral fragments. This species associates with C. microps and C. cyanops. However this species is less numerous than either of those species, it is found greater depths than C. microps, but at lesser depths than C. cyanops. It forages on or just above the substrate and its diet is mainly crustaceans and other invertebrates, with some small fish. It is long-lived, able to reach 30–35 years old.

== Systematics ==
Caulolatilus chrysops was first formally described as Latilus chrysops in 1833 by the French zoologist Achille Valenciennes (1795–1865) with the type locality given as Brazil. It is the type species of the genus Caulolatilus. The specific name chrysops means gold-eye and refers to the Golden yellow stripe between the eye and mouth.

== Utilisation ==
Caulolatilus chrysops is a minor component of the sport fishing catch in the western Atlantic. It is a target species for commercial fisheries and is normally sold fresh. Tilefish are a quarry for the deep-water fishery of Puerto Rico which uses bottom lines and fish traps to take them. Brazil catches more of this species than other states with waters within its range for the aquarium trade. It is taken as bycatch in the shrimp fishery and in the scampi fishery of São Paulo State where it has commercial value. Tilefishes are targeted by commercial and sports fisheries in the southeastern United States and the Gulf of Mexico.
