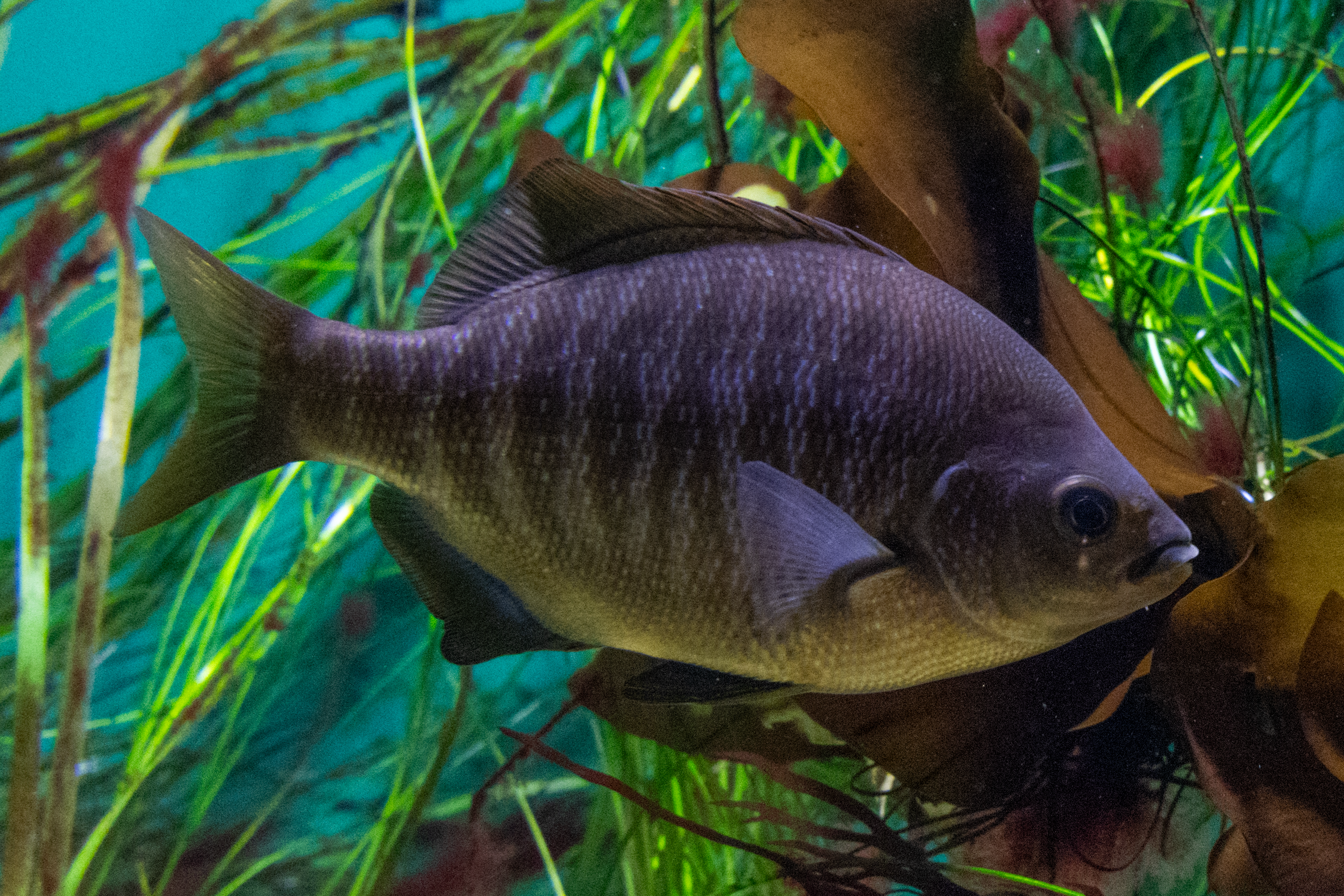
- At the Aquarium of the Pacific

Conservation status
- Least Concern (IUCN 3.1)

Scientific classification
- Kingdom: Animalia
- Phylum: Chordata
- Class: Actinopterygii
- Order: Blenniiformes
- Family: Embiotocidae
- Genus: Embiotoca
- Species: E. jacksoni

Binomial name
- Embiotoca jacksoni Agassiz, 1853

Synonyms
- Embiotoca cassidyi Girard, 1854; Embiotoca webbi Girard, 1855; Holconotus fuliginosus Gibbons, 1854

= Embiotoca jacksoni =

Species of fish

Embiotoca jacksoni, commonly known as the black surfperch, is a species of surfperch native to shallow coastal areas of the Eastern Pacific Ocean. Other common names of the species include black perch and butterlips. They are commercially important food and game fish.

== Taxonomy and etymology ==
Embiotoca jacksoni is one of two species classified under the genus Embiotoca, the other being the striped surfperch (Embiotoca lateralis). The species was first described by the Swiss-American biologist Louis Agassiz in 1853.

The specific name honors A.C Jackson who carried out a survey of port locations in San Francisco where he drew a sketch of a gravid female which he sent to Agassiz.

== Distribution and habitat ==
Black surfperches are native to the eastern Pacific. They can be found from shallow coastal waters from Fort Bragg, California to Punta Abreojos, Baja California Sur, including off Guadalupe Island. They are usually found as individuals or in small groups of three or four at depths of 6.1 m (20 ft) but can reach depths of 46 m (151 ft). They inhabit rocky areas and reefs, eelgrass beds, and kelp forests, but can occasionally be found in sandy areas near human structures like piers or pilings. They have also been observed going into Northern San Francisco Bay.

== Description ==
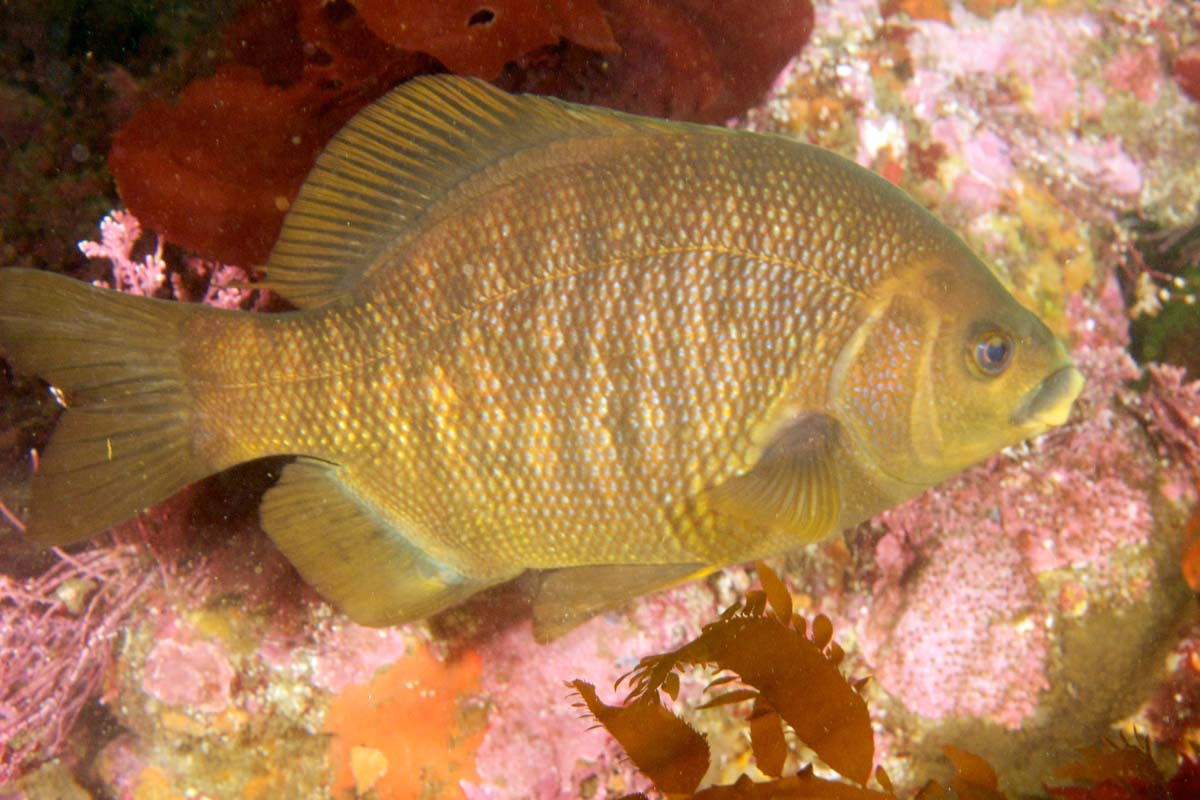
Adult, in California

The black surfperch has a laterally compressed frontal profile and deep body. Despite their common name, they are not black in color. They are usually a uniform dark reddish brown to tan in color, but they often also possess large darker colored vertical bars across their body (unlike striped surfperches, which have horizontal orange and blue stripes). Rarely, they may exhibit a paler silvery to greenish-white body coloration with fainter bars, thus resembling barred surfperches (Amphistichus argenteus). Black surfperches can still be distinguished, however, by the presence of a patch of enlarged scales between the pectoral and the pelvic fins.

They reach a maximum length of 38 cm (15 in) and a maximum weight of 1.22 kg (2.7 lb).

The thick lips are yellowish in color and may exhibit a darker "mustache" above the upper lip. The tail and pelvic fins are usually orange to reddish, occasionally possessing gold and dark blue stripes. They are believed to be capable of changing color for camouflage.

== Biology and ecology ==
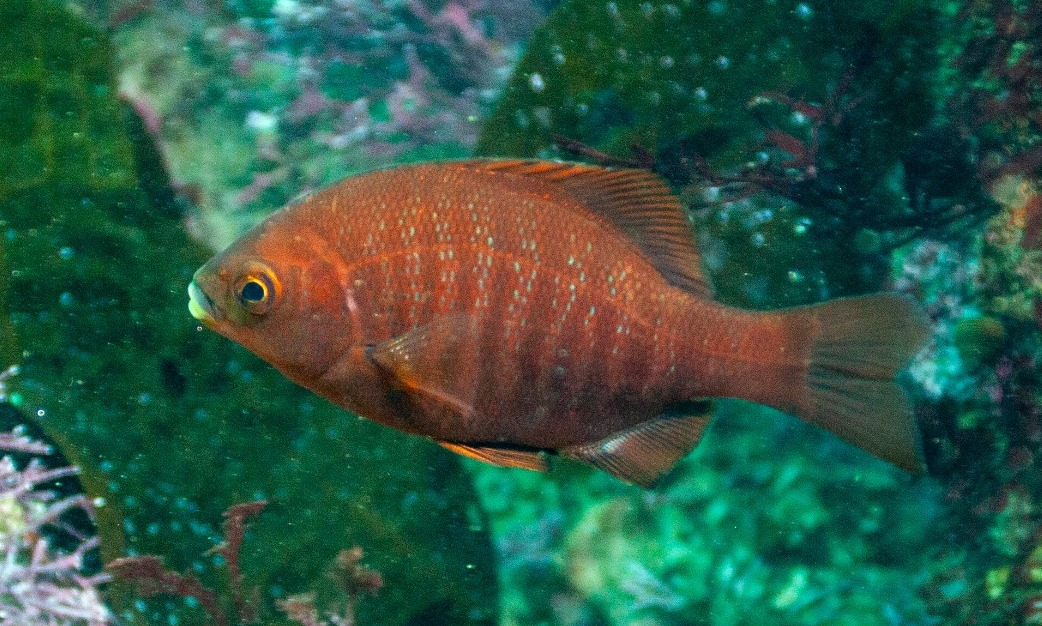
Juvenile, in California

During mating season in the summer, the males develop a pair of nipple-like organs extending from their anal fins. Like all surfperches, they are viviparous (giving birth to live young). They reach sexual maturity after one or two years (at the length of 15 cm (5.9 in)) and can live for up to nine years.

They are carnivorous, feeding primarily on small invertebrates during the day. Prey animals consist mostly of gammarid amphipods and other crustaceans, but they also prey on worms, ophiuroids/brittle stars, bryozoans, small crabs, and mollusks. They have been known to eat large amounts of substrate gravel, filter the food, and spit out the non-nutritious debris. Smaller black surfperches can behave as cleaner fish, consuming ectoparasites from other fish species.

== Fishery ==
They are commercially important food and game fish. They are usually caught by baited hooks and spearfishing. They are often caught using shrimp, mussel meat, or marine worms. As an inshore species, they are most commonly caught by recreational anglers.

== Gallery ==
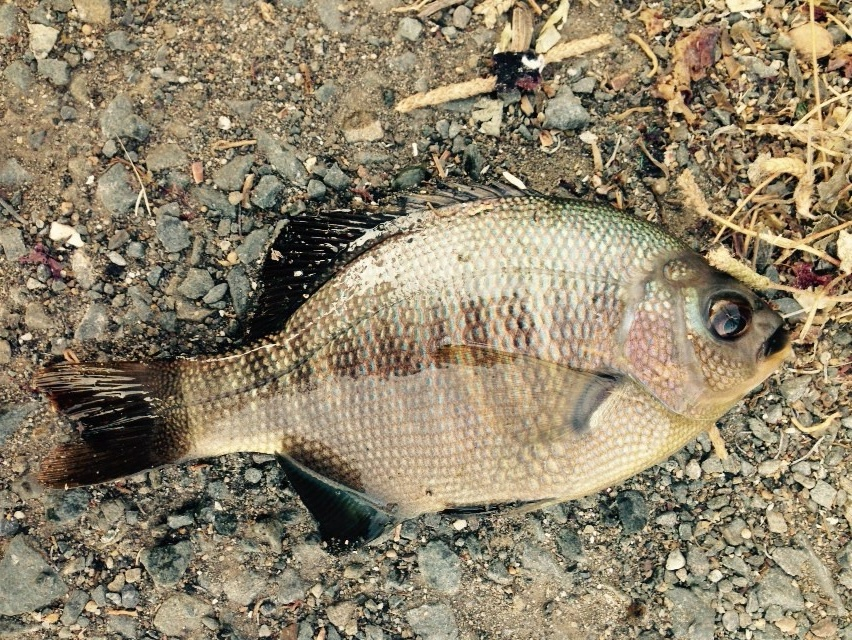

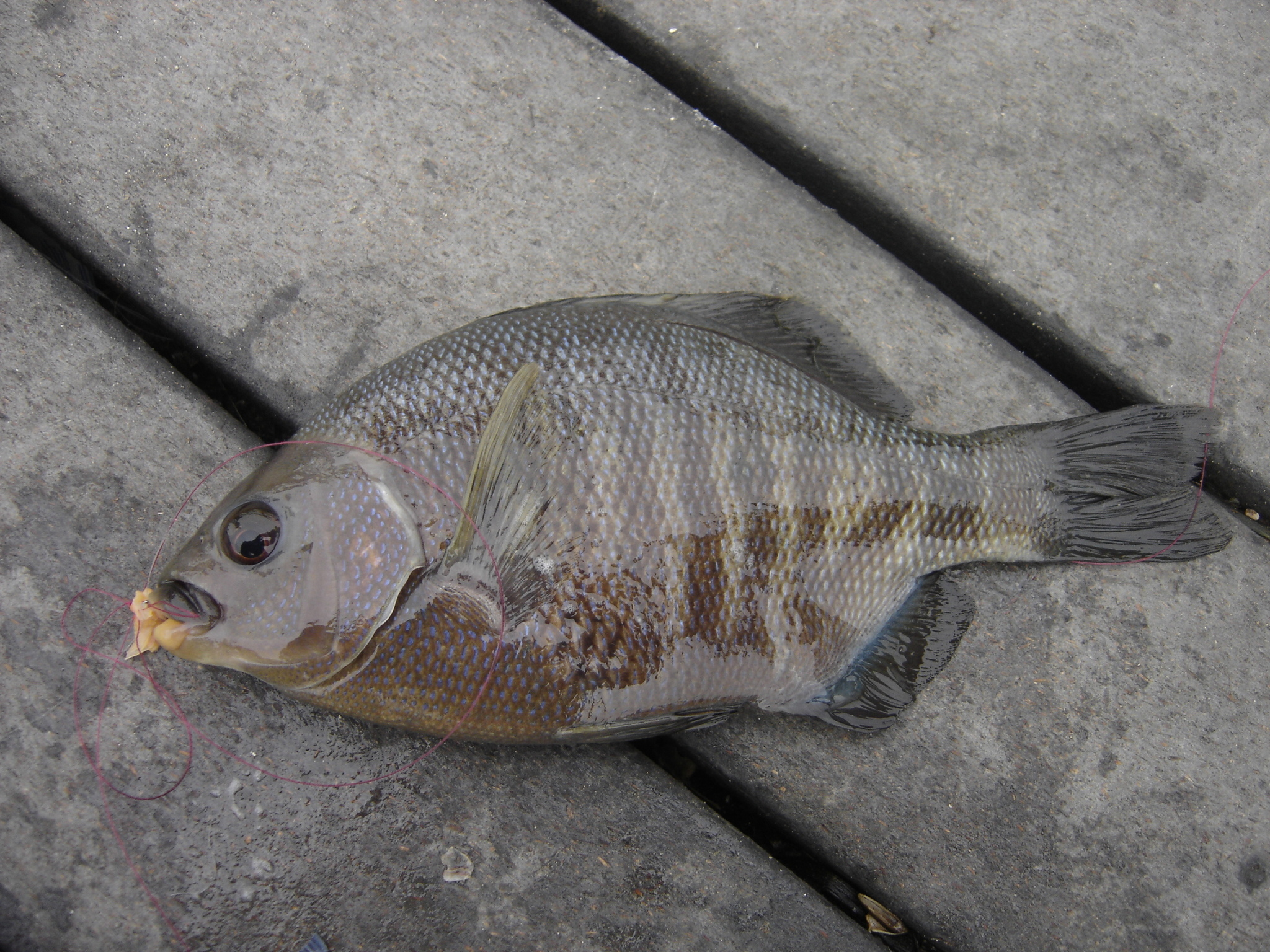

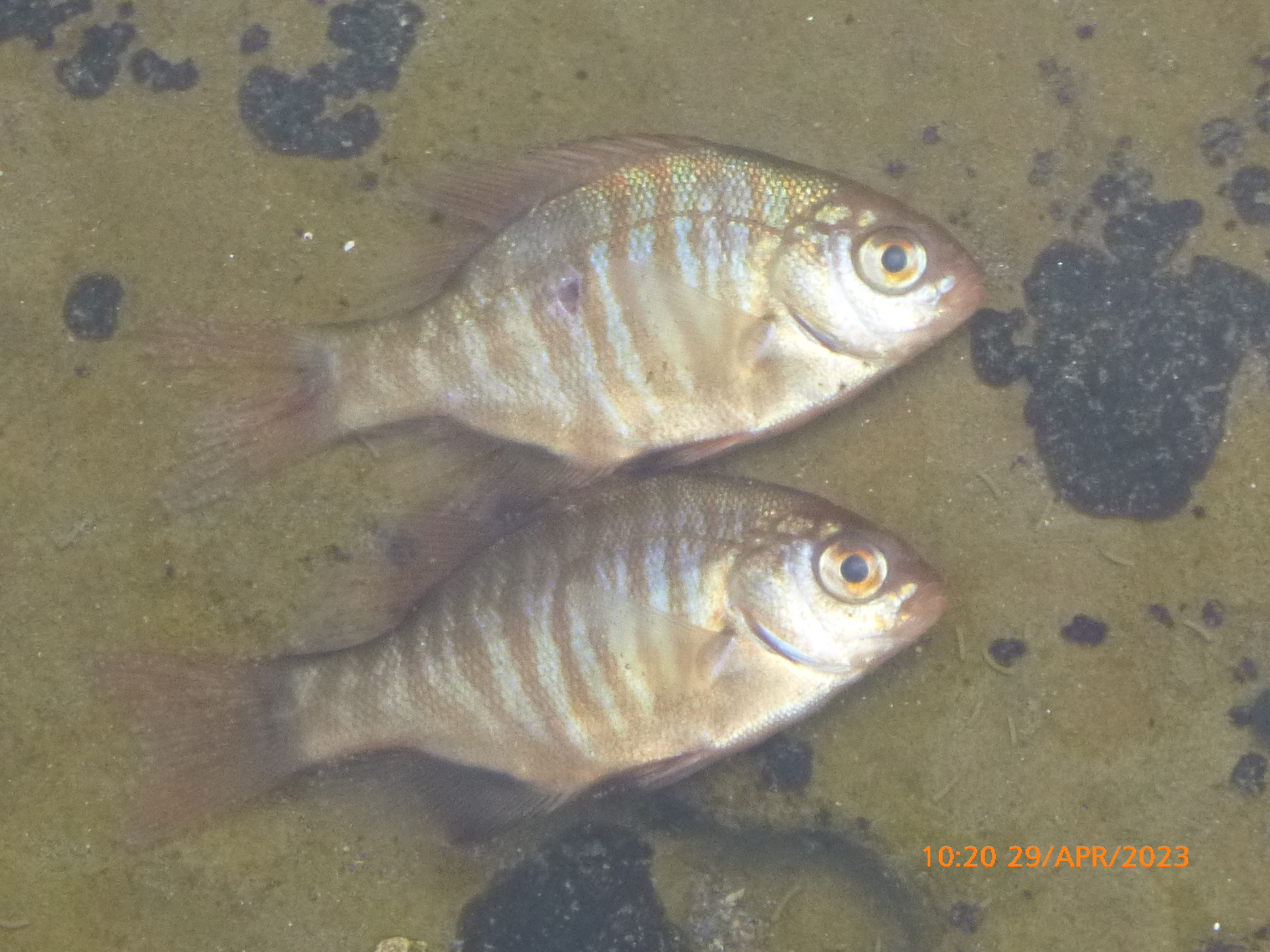
Juveniles

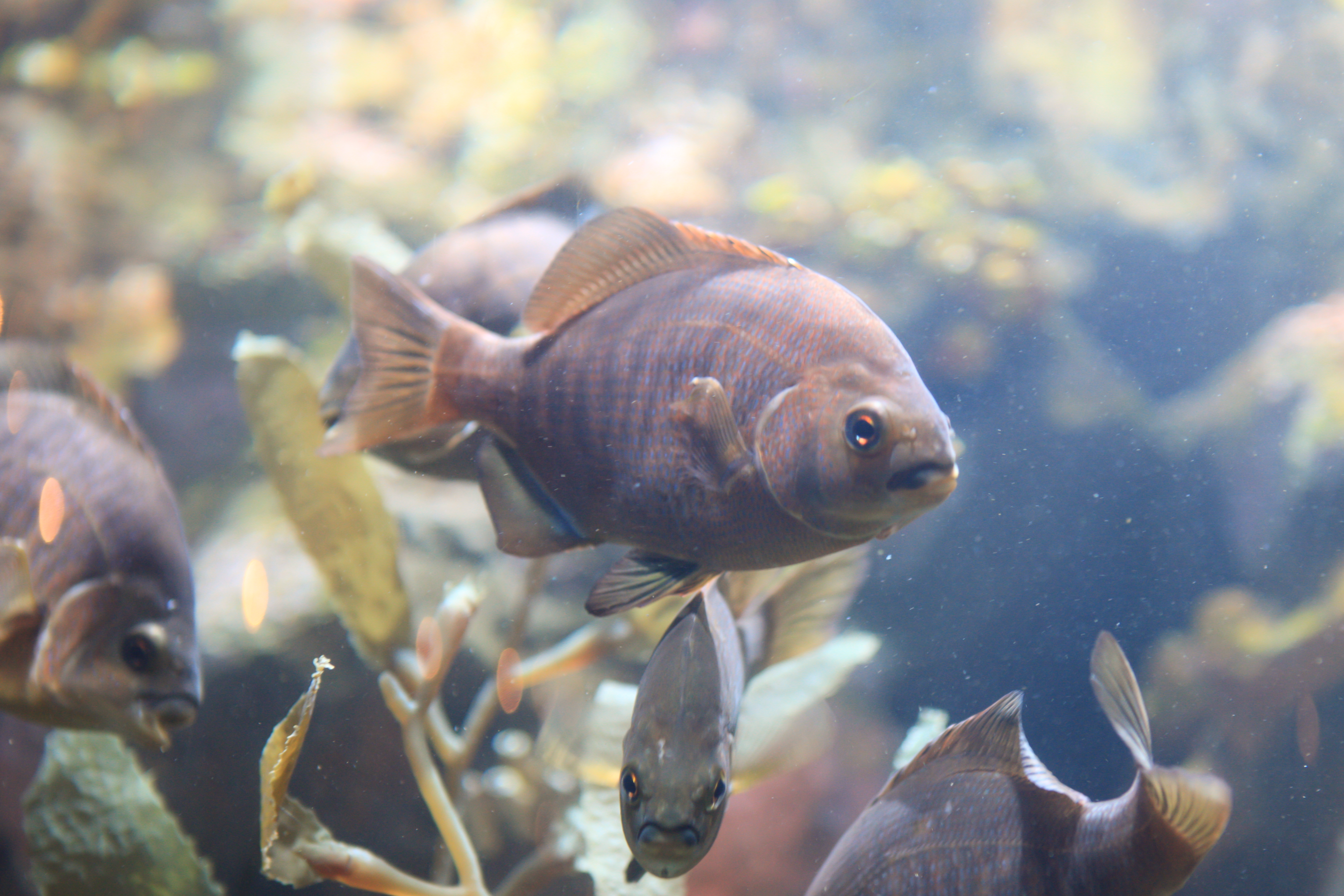
Schooling

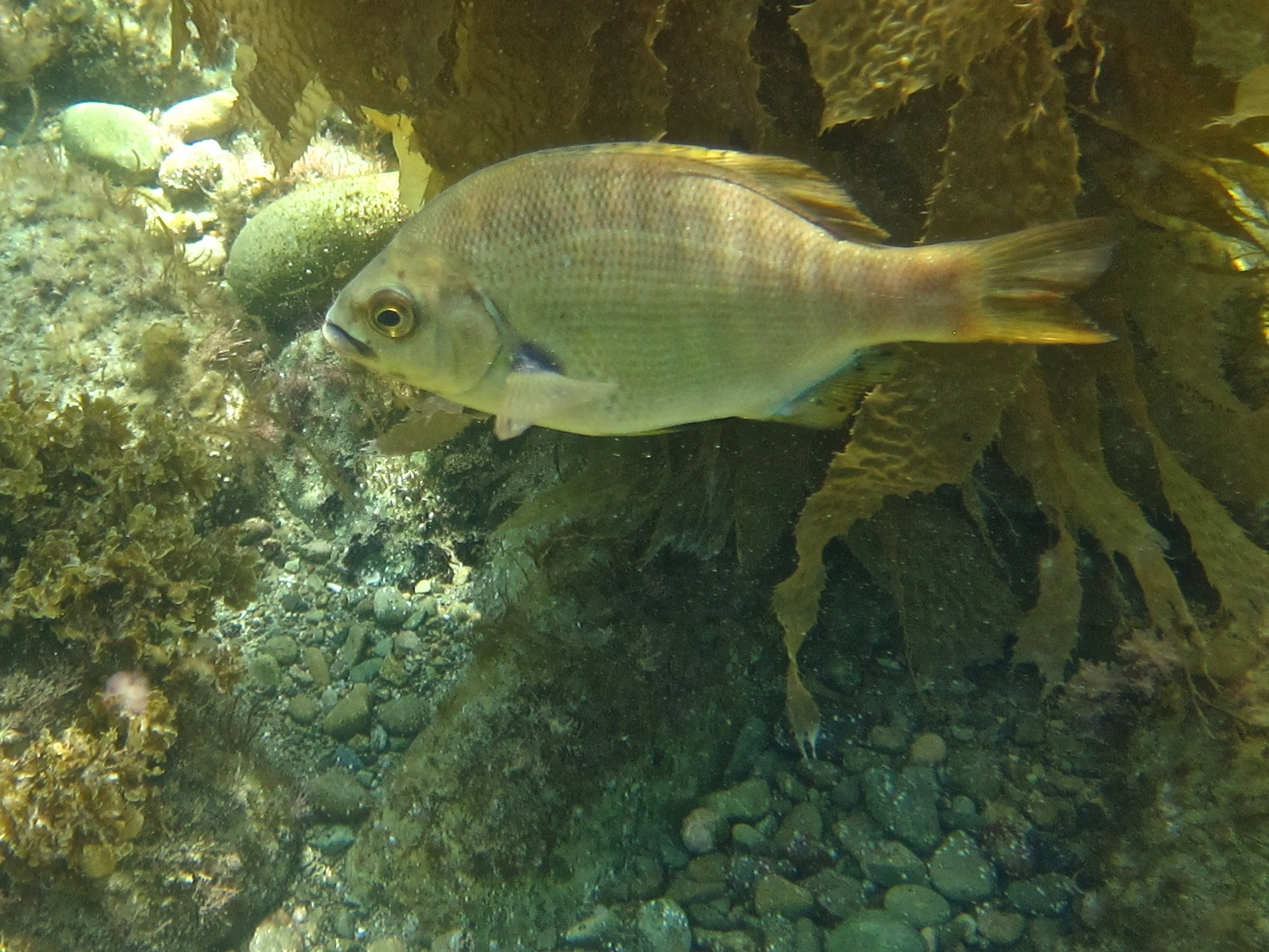
Light colouration

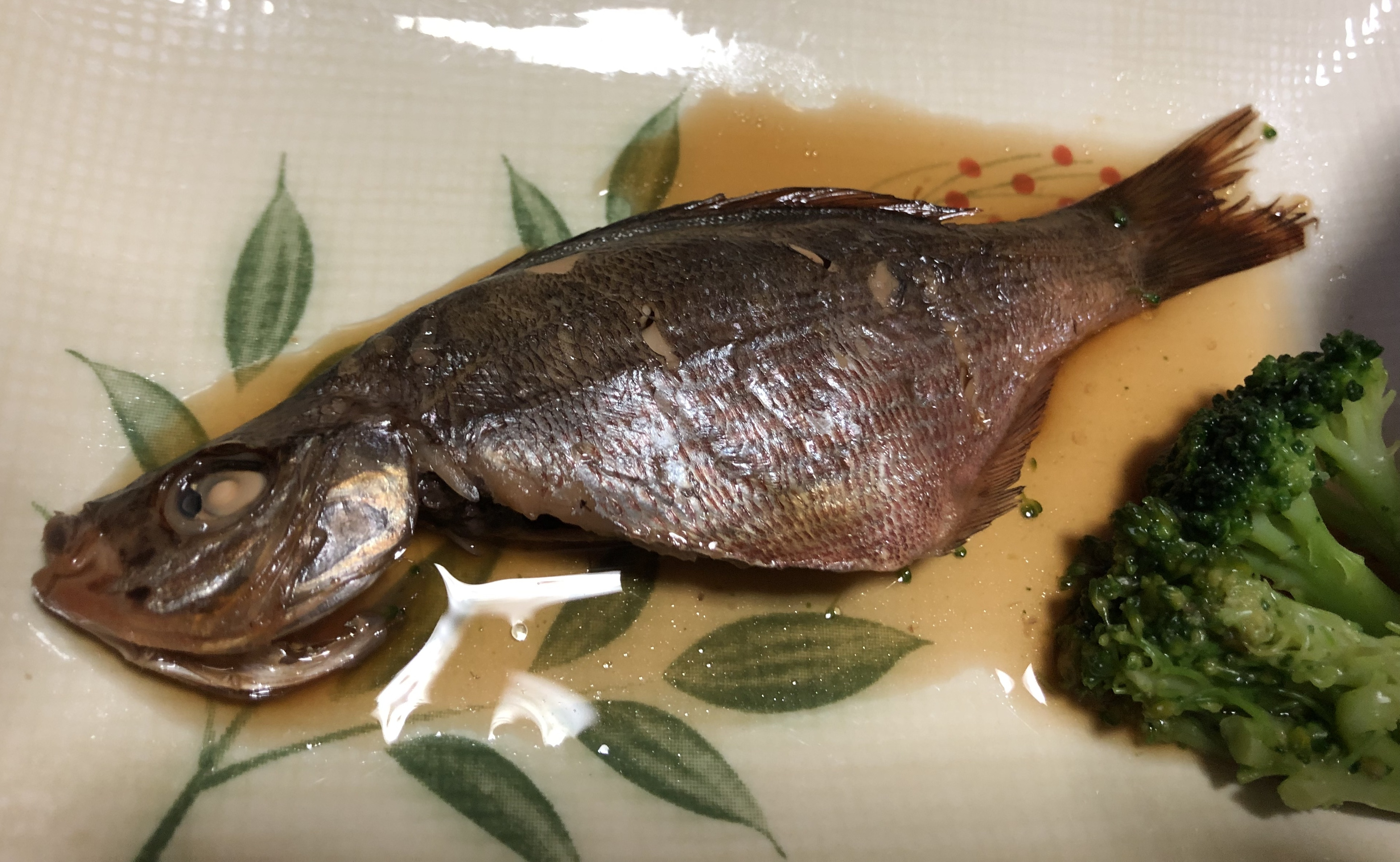
Recently prepared black surfperch
