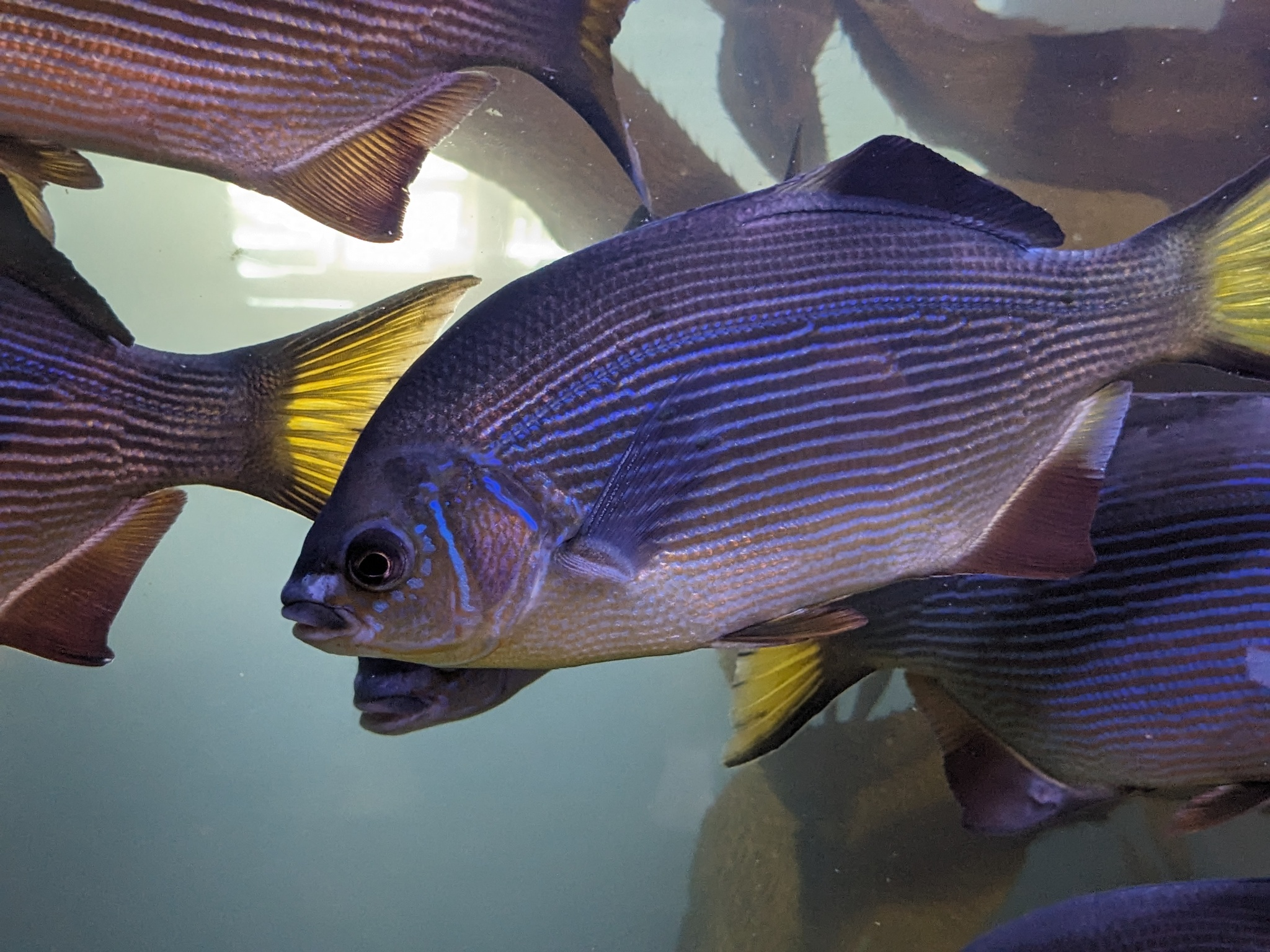
- At the Ucluelet Aquarium

Conservation status
- Least Concern (IUCN 3.1)

Scientific classification
- Kingdom: Animalia
- Phylum: Chordata
- Class: Actinopterygii
- Order: Blenniiformes
- Family: Embiotocidae
- Genus: Embiotoca
- Species: E. lateralis

Binomial name
- Embiotoca lateralis Agassiz, 1854

Synonyms
- List: Ditrema laterale (Agassiz, 1854); Embiotoca lineata Girard, 1854; Embiotoca ornata Girard, 1855; Embiotoca perspicabilis Girard, 1855; Holconotus agassizi Gibbons, 1854; Phanerodon cateralis (Agassiz, 1854) (misspelling); Sema signifer Jordan, 1878; Taeniotoca lateralis (Agassiz, 1854)

= Embiotoca lateralis =

Species of fish

Embiotoca lateralis, commonly known as the striped surfperch or striped seaperch, is a species of surfperch native to the Northeastern Pacific Ocean.

== Distribution ==
The striped surfperch is found from Punta Baja, Central Baja California, to Wrangrell, Southeastern Alaska.

== Habitat ==
It is often found near rocky reefs, eelgrass beds, kelp forests, and underwater structures, including man-made piers. While frequenting shallow waters and intertidal zones, the striped surfperch can be found at depths up to 95 metres (312 ft).

== Description ==
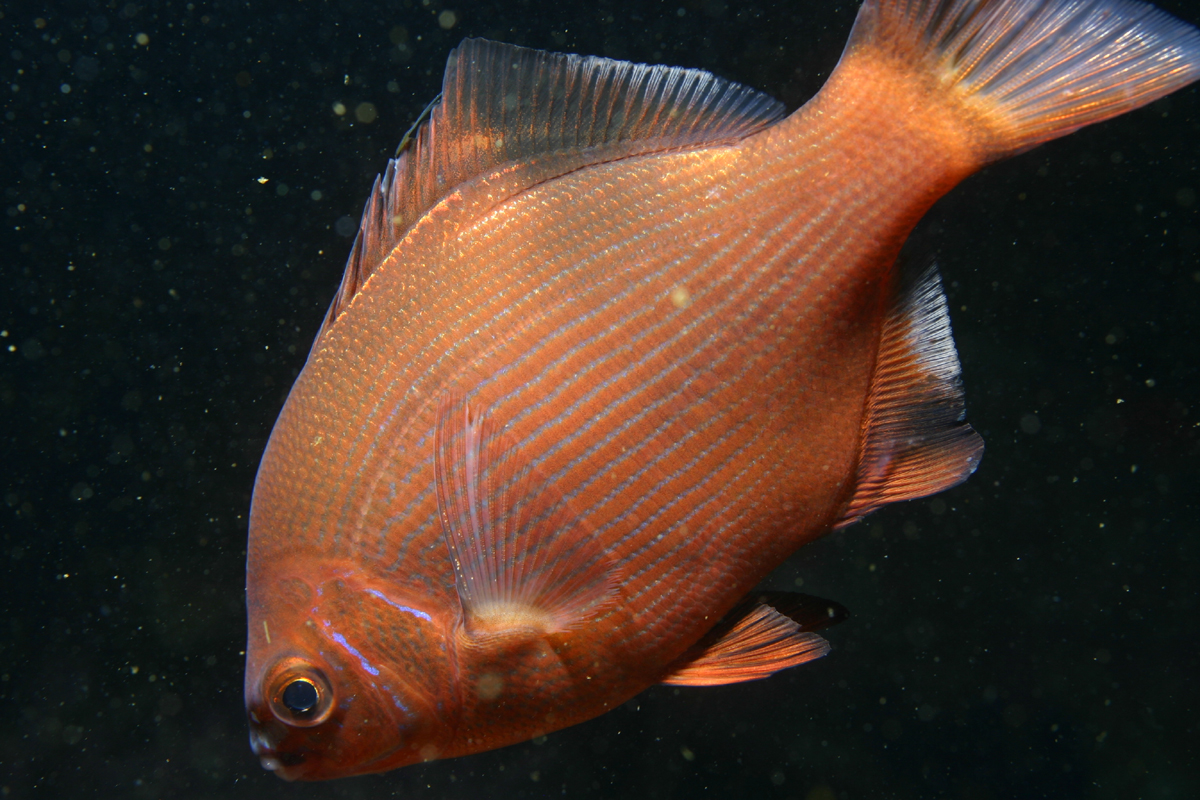
Juvenile

The striped surfperch is characterized by bright blue stripes running lengthwise down the body, which can be bronze, brown-orange, or pink to darker black. It has blue spots on the head and operculum. The fins are often orange to yellow-black, and the anal and soft dorsal fins can possess black bands. They are deep bodied and have a laterally compressed frontal profile. They have small teeth on the mouth.

Individuals reach maximum lengths of 41.5 centimetres (16.3 in) and a maximum weight of 1 kilogram (2.2 lb).

Like other surfperch, the fish is viviparous, giving birth to life offspring. They mature at around 2 years of age, usually being around 22–25 cm (8.7–9.8 in).

== Ecology ==
It is sympatric with its only congener, the black surfperch (E. jacksoni). The two species share a high degree of overlap in their diets of small benthic crustaceans and bryozoans. As a result of interspecific competition, in areas where both species are present, E. lateralis is more often found in shallow algae-covered reefs, while E. jacksoni is more often found in deeper, comparatively food-poor waters.

== Diet ==
The striped surfperch, like its close relative the black surfperch (Embiotoca jacksoni,) often feeds on marine worms, bryozoans, small crustaceans, and molluscs (such as bivalves and gastropods). They have also been observed eating ophiuroids/brittle stars, sea urchins, and fish eggs.

== Fishery ==
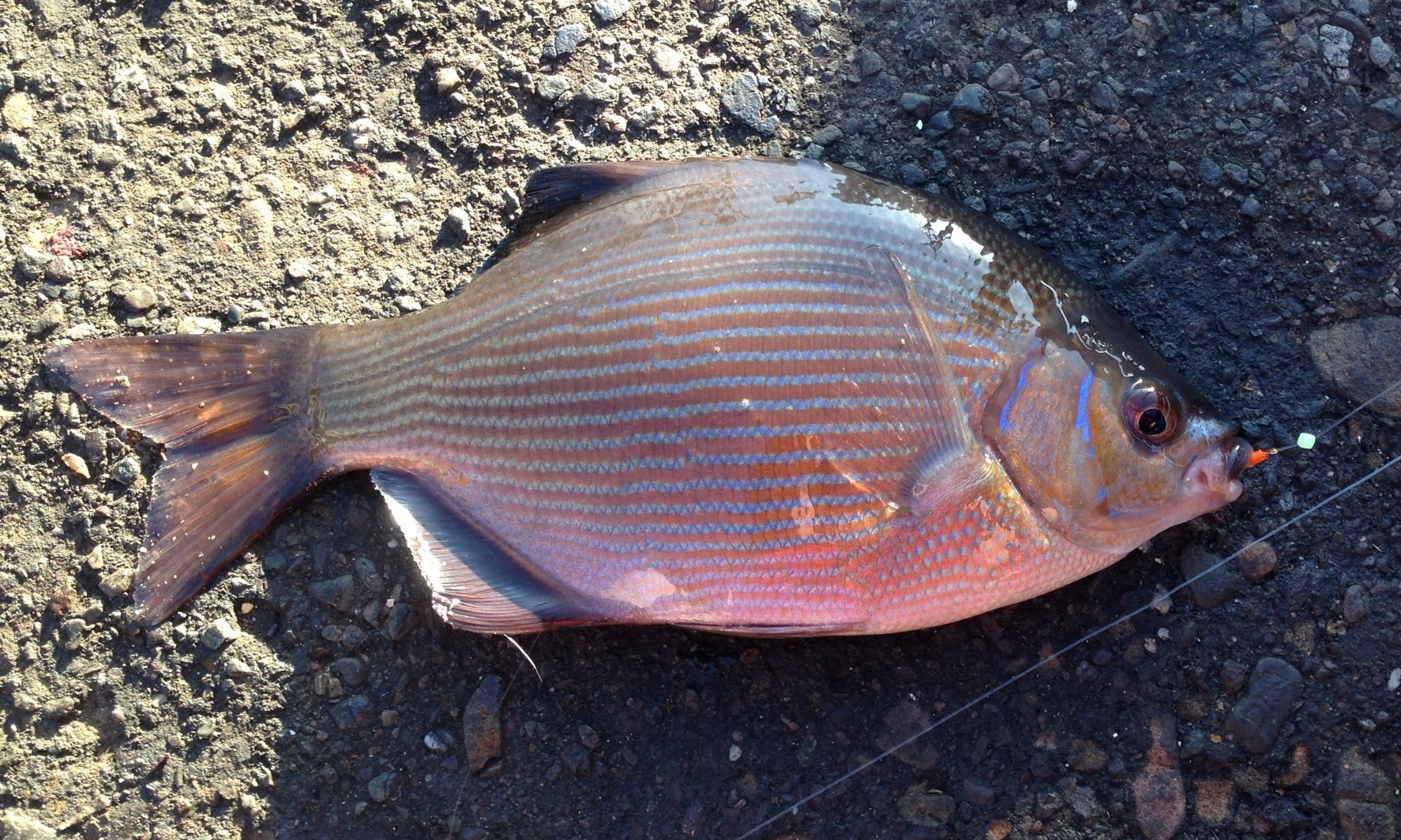
In California

Striped surfperch are a common recreational catch by inshore anglers, especially when targeting rockfish. They may be as much as 10% of recreational catches in north of San Francisco (excluding salmon.) They are known to have a mild taste and flaky meat, but as larger ones are often pregnant, they are thrown back. There is no targeted commercial fishery for the species, but they are taken incidentally on occasion.

== Gallery ==
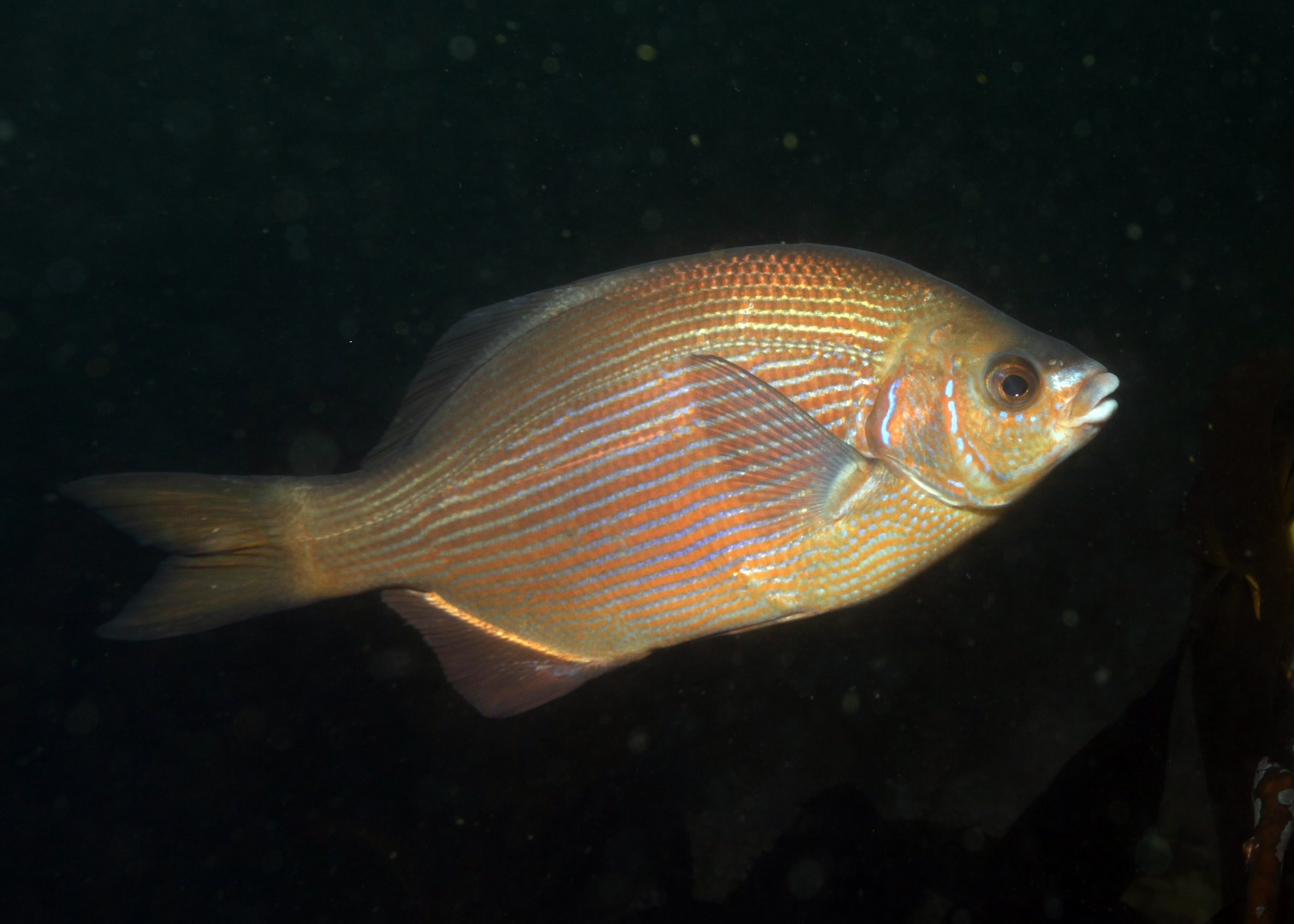
In California

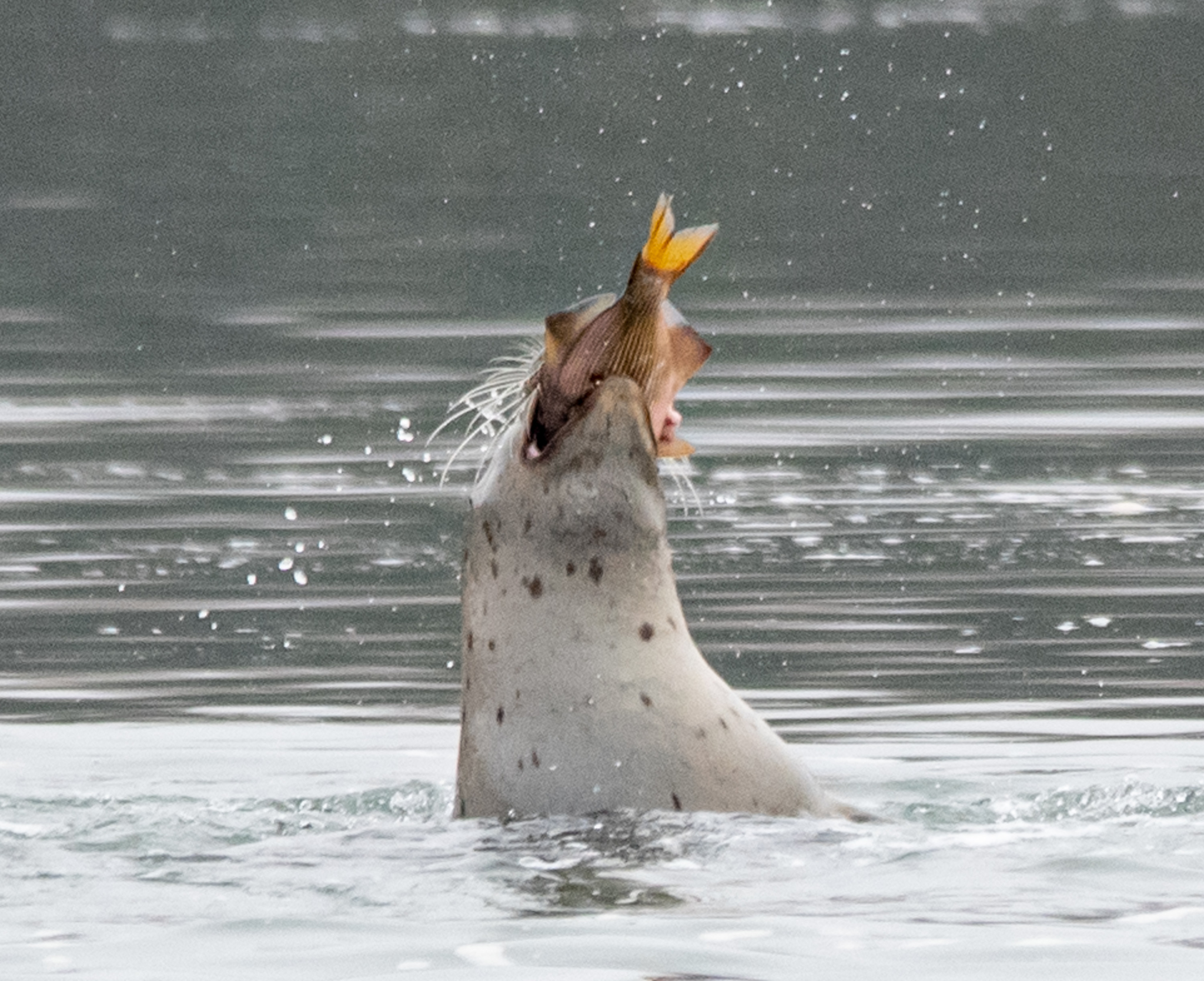
Eaten by a harbour seal

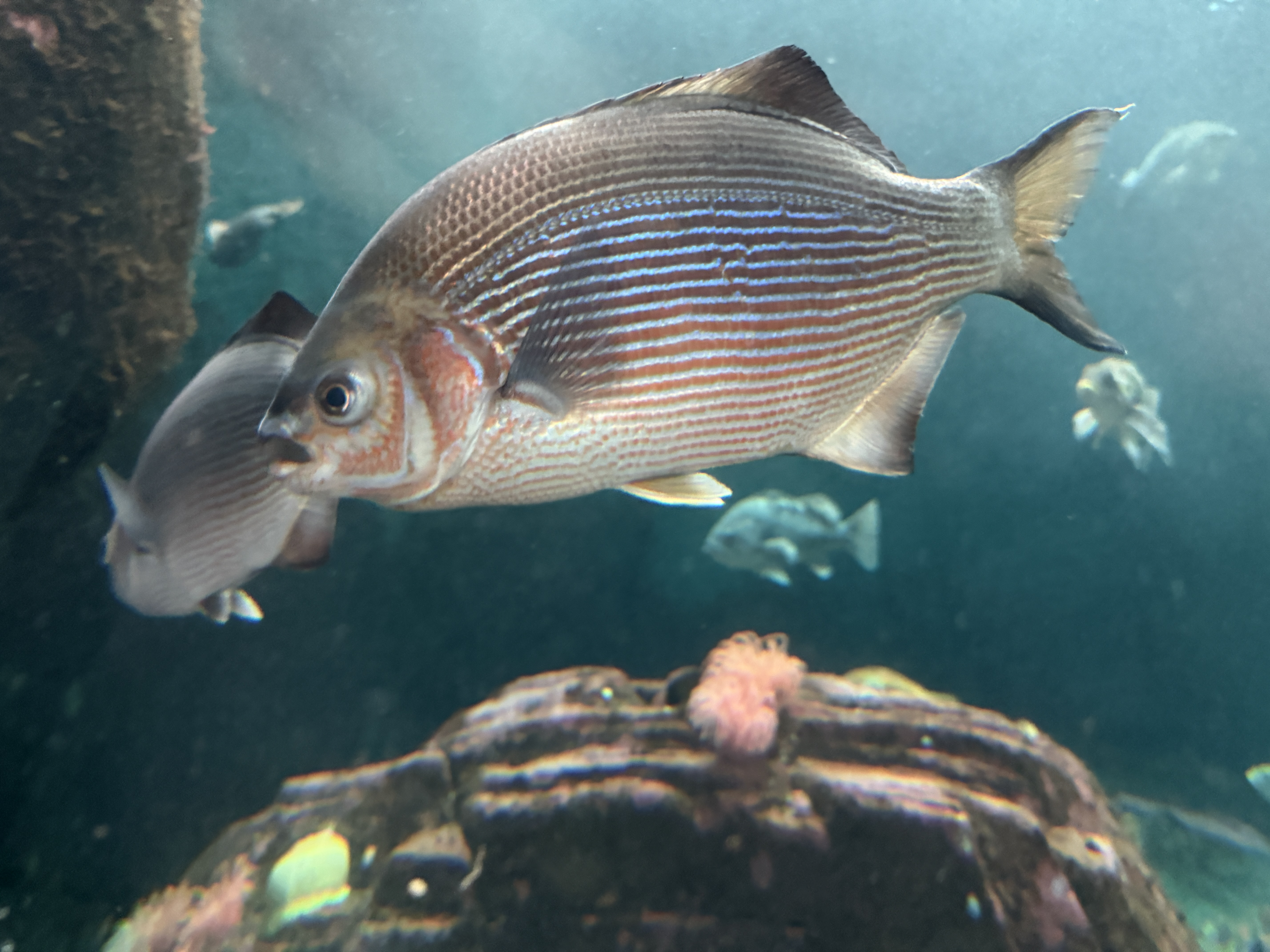
At the Vancouver Aquarium

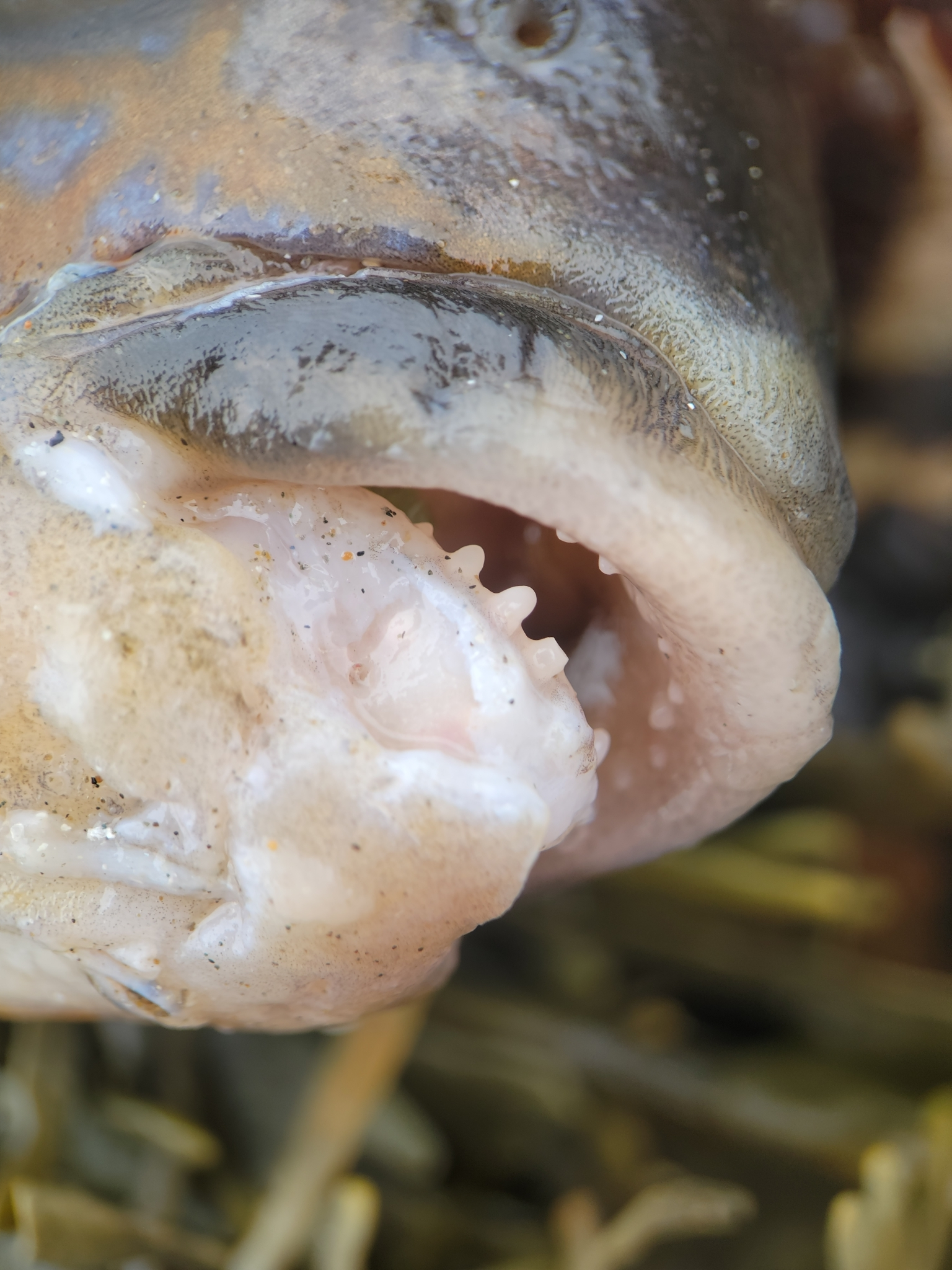
Showing the teeth and fleshy lips

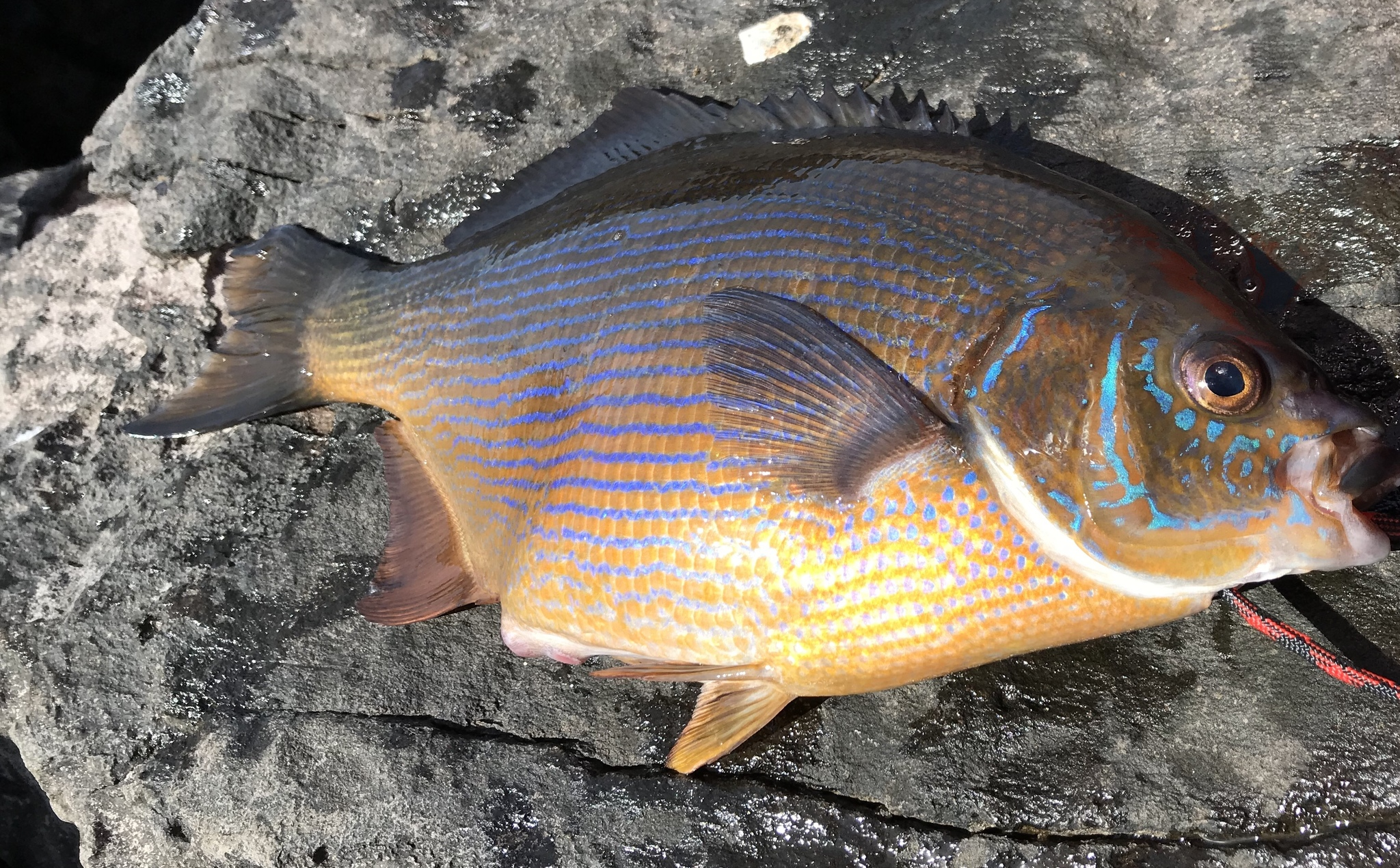
In Oregon

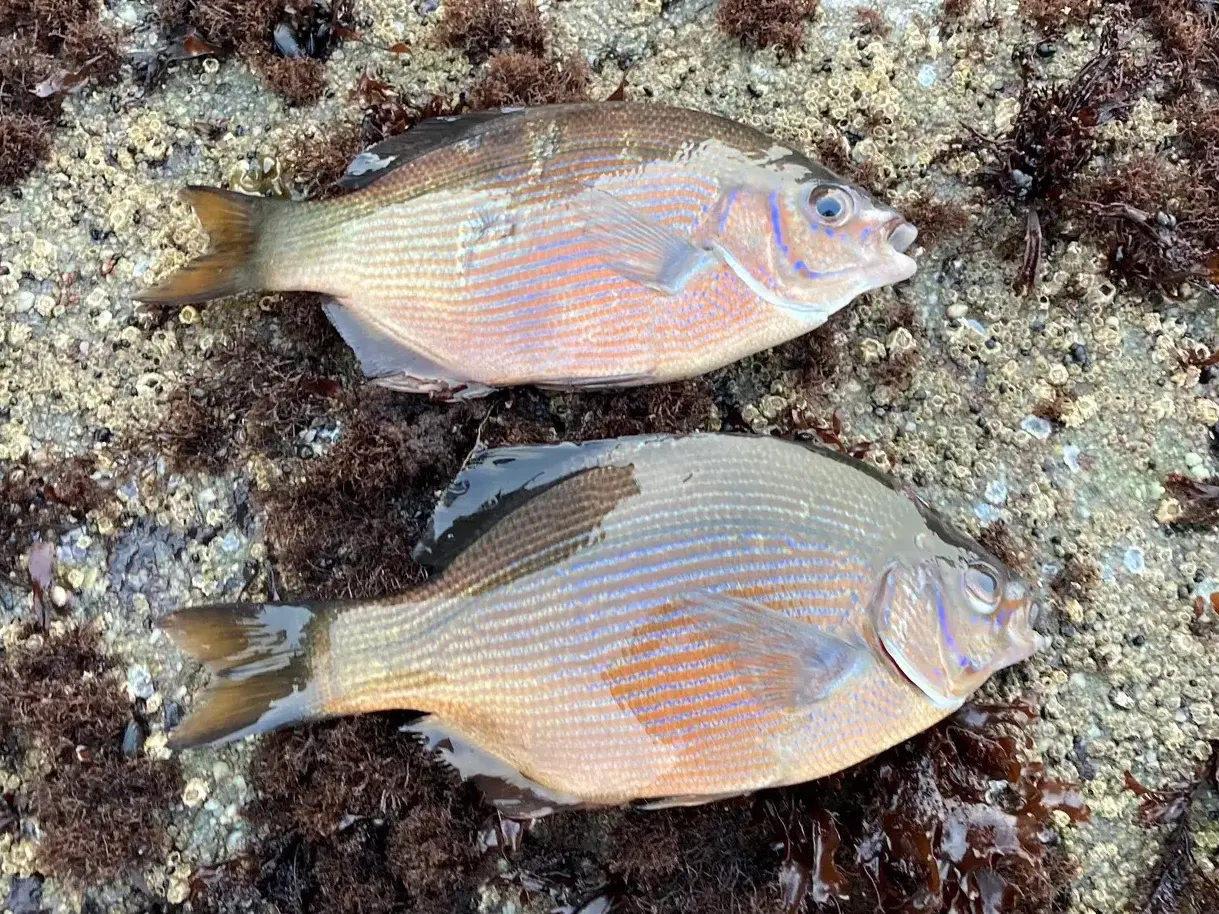
In California
