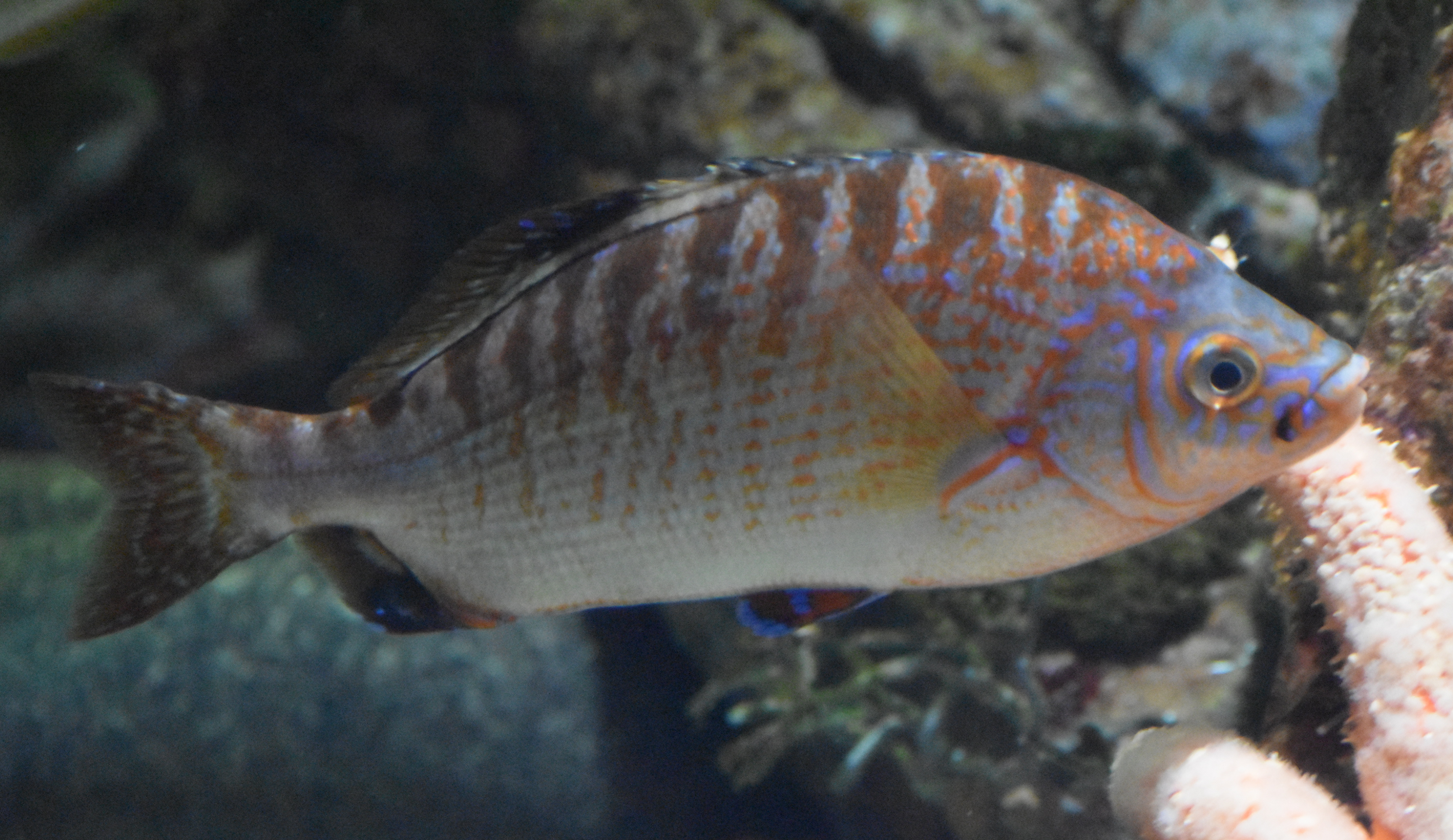

Scientific classification
- Kingdom: Animalia
- Phylum: Chordata
- Class: Actinopterygii
- Order: Blenniiformes
- Family: Embiotocidae
- Genus: Hypsurus; Agassiz, 1861
- Species: H. caryi

Binomial name
- Hypsurus caryi (Agassiz, 1853)

Synonyms
- Embiotoca caryi Agassiz, 1853

= Rainbow surfperch =

Species of fish

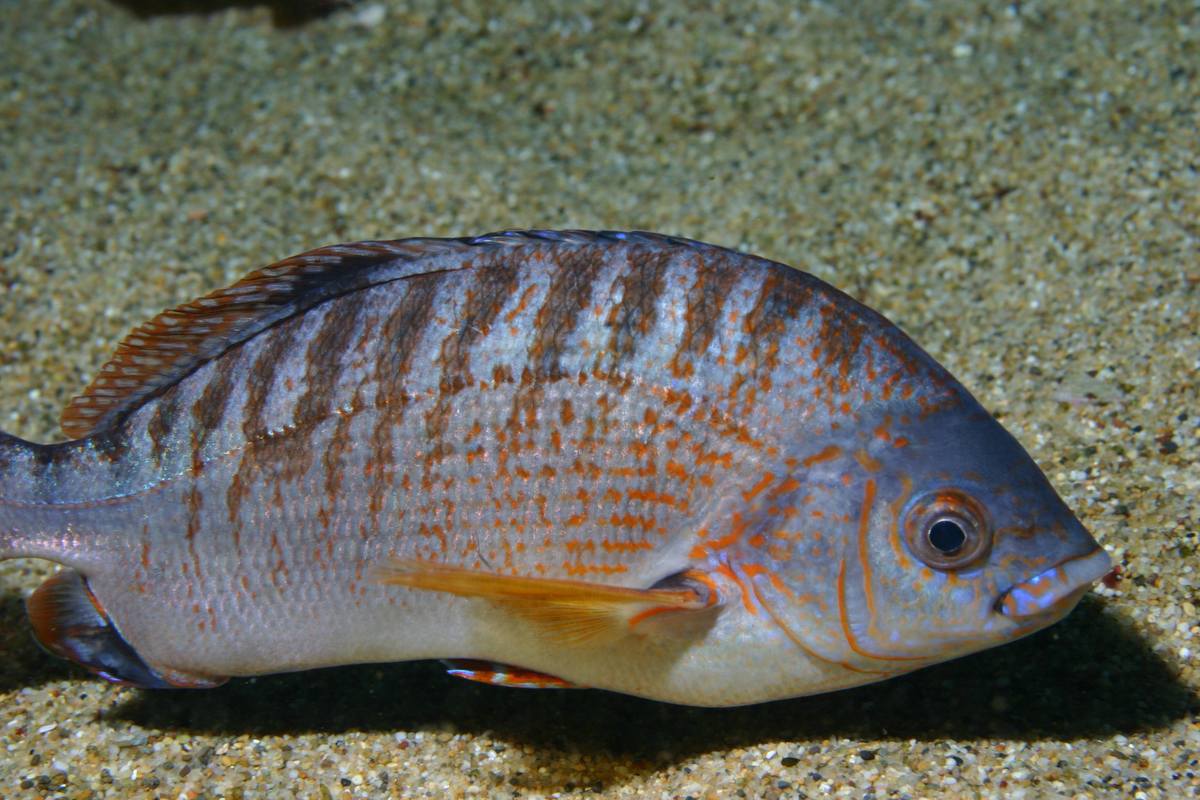
A rainbow surfperch near the seafloor

The rainbow surfperch (Hypsurus caryi), also known as rainbow seaperch, or bugara, is a species of surfperch found in the Eastern Pacific Ocean. It is often regarded as the most colorful of the surfperches.

== Taxonomy and etymology ==
Hypsurus comes from the greek word "hyps" for "high," the latin word "urus" (a kind of ox,) and the greek word "cary," meaning nut, apparently a reference to the fish's shape. The specific name honors Thomas Cary (1824-1888), a business man and amateur naturalist who was also the brother-in-law of Louis Agassiz who procured specimens that confirmed that this species was viviparous.

This species is the only known member of its genus, but has also been placed in the genus Embiotoca.

== Description ==
The rainbow surfperch displays a typical surfperch outline, with a deep body and laterally compressed profile. Rainbow surfperch are one of the most colorful surfperch, having red bands from the top to the side of the body, and a grey, pink, or orange body, with an orange face adorned with blue spots. The fins are yellow to red-orange, and the tips of the first spines, as well as a spot on the soft dorsal fin and the anal fin are black. The pectoral fin is also lightly striped, and the edge is a vibrant blue.

They are sometimes confused with the striped surfperch (Embiotoca lateralis,) as both fish display rainbow coloration and blue dots on the face, but striped surfperch tend to be much darker and less elongated.

This species grows to a maximum length of 30.5 cm (12.0 in) TL.

== Range ==
The rainbow surfperch is found along the Pacific coast of North America from Cape Mendocino, California to Northern Baja California, Mexico.

== Biology and ecology ==
Rainbow surfperch prefers rocky shores and substrate over sandy ones, and is never found in the surf zone, preferring the edges of kelp forests or seagrass beds down to depths of about 40 metres (130 ft), with some recorded as deep as 50 metres (160 ft). This species primarily eats small snails, crustaceans, and polychaete worms, as well as eating algae and small fish. Young fish may also perform a cleaner fish role, eating parasites off larger fish. They have also been known to sift through the sand looking for prey.

Like other surfperch, the species is viviparous, giving birth to live offspring. The fish mate in large aggregations during the fall, and birth nine to 29 offspring that are around 6.8 cm (2.7 in) in shallow or tidal waters after seven to nine months of gestation.

== Relation to humans ==
There is no targeted commercial fishery for the species. They can be a common catch for anglers fishing in rocky areas or near kelp forests. As they are one of the smaller species of surfperch, and also admired for their color, they are often thrown back.

The conservation status of the fish has not been formally evaluated.
