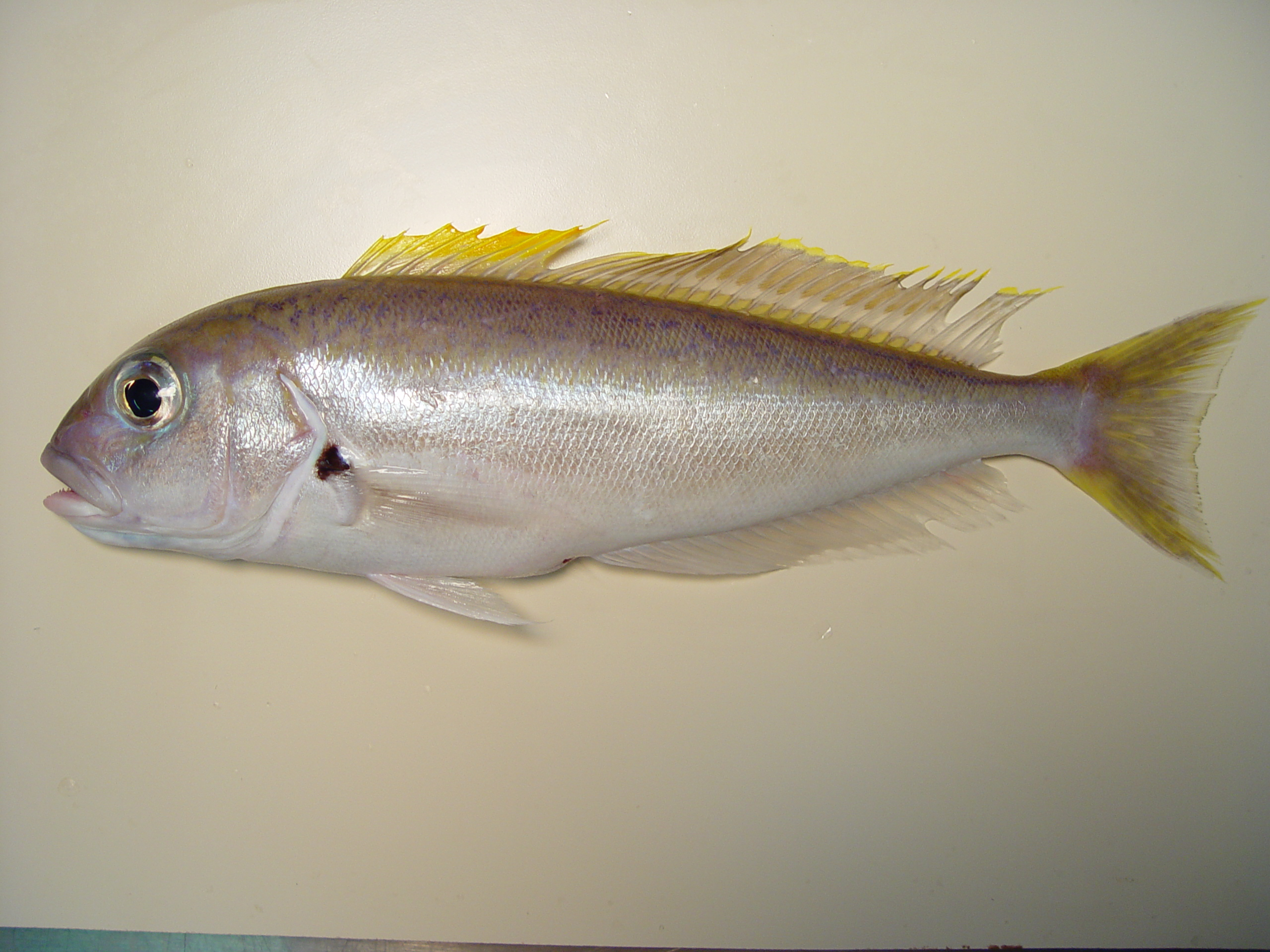

Conservation status
- Least Concern (IUCN 3.1)

Scientific classification
- Kingdom: Animalia
- Phylum: Chordata
- Class: Actinopterygii
- Order: Acanthuriformes
- Family: Latilidae
- Genus: Caulolatilus
- Species: C. cyanops

Binomial name
- Caulolatilus cyanops Poey, 1866

= Caulolatilus cyanops =

Species of fish

Caulolatilus cyanops, the blackline tilefish or ocean whitefish, is a species of marine ray-finned fish, a tilefish belonging to the family Malacanthidae. It is found in the western Atlantic Ocean.

== Description ==
Caulolatilus cyanops has a sturdy, quadrangular body with a relatively deep head which has a rounded profile. There is a fleshy ridge along the centreline of the body in front of the dorsal fin. The gill cover has a short blunt spine and serrations along its vertical margin. It has a body which varies in colour from violet to blue with a dark area on the back which is marked with many lines which form a lattice pattern, in addition there is a dark stripe along the back. The underparts are white. There is a yellow coloured ridge on the nape, silvery cheeks and an angled bluish-green bar which runs from the eye to the upper lip. The membranes of the spinous part of the dorsal fin are orange-yellow, there is a dark blotch above the vase of the pectoral fin while the caudal fin lobes are mainly yellow. They can reach a length of 60 centimetres (24 in) TL though most are around 30 centimetres (12 in). The greatest recorded weight for this species is 11 kilograms (24 lb).

== Distribution ==
Caulolatilus cyanops is native to the western Atlantic Ocean where they are found from North Carolina to the northern coast of South America. Their range extends into the Gulf of Mexico and the Caribbean.

== Habitat and biology ==
Caulolatilus cyanops inhabits the seafloor in areas with muddy or sandy substrates at depths of from 45 to 495 metres (148 to 1,624 ft) though they are usually found between 150 and 250 metres (490 and 820 ft). They prey on invertebrates and smaller fishes. They are usually recorded associating with C. microps and C. chrysops.

== Systematics ==
Caulolatilus cyanops was first formally described in 1866 by the Cuban zoologist Felipe Poey (1799-1891) with the type locality given as Cuba. The specific name cyanops means blue-eye and refers to the stripe between the eye and mouth.

== Utilisation ==
Caulolatilus cyanops is commercially important and is also sought after as a game fish. It is especially important asa quarry for commercial fisheries off Venezuela and Colombia.
