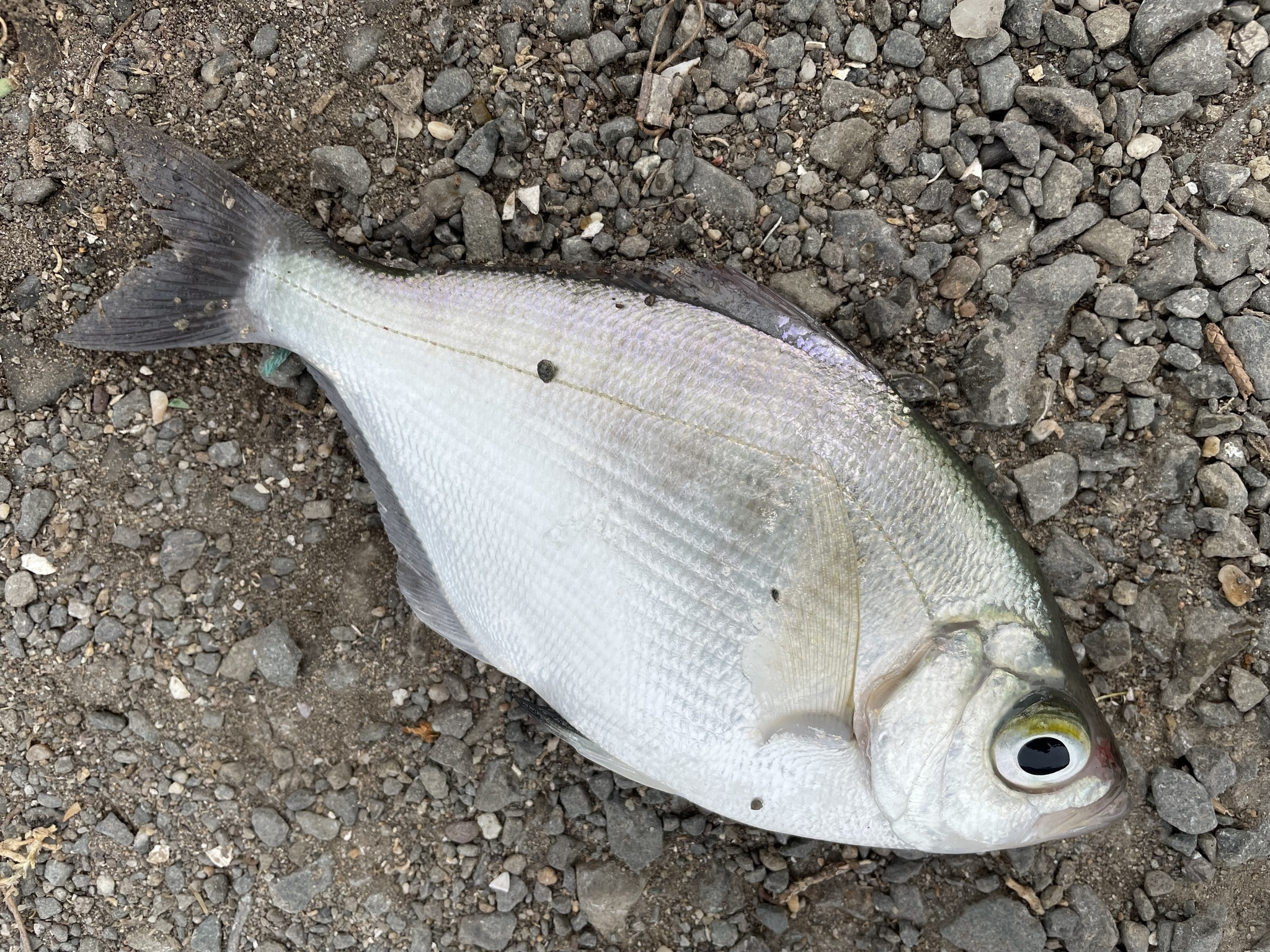

Scientific classification
- Kingdom: Animalia
- Phylum: Chordata
- Class: Actinopterygii
- Order: Blenniiformes
- Family: Embiotocidae
- Genus: Hyperprosopon
- Species: H. argenteum

Binomial name
- Hyperprosopon argenteum (Gibbons, 1854)

Synonyms
- Hyperprosopon argenteus Gibbons, 1854

= Hyperprosopon argenteum =

Walleye Surfperch

Species of fish

Hyperprosopon argenteum, the walleye surfperch, is a species of surfperch native to the Eastern Pacific Ocean. It may also be known as the bigeye perch and chinese pompano. They are one of two species in the genus Hyperprosopon.

== Description ==
The body of the Walleye surfperch is oval and strongly compressed. The head is small and the eyes are large. The mouth is small and slanted upwards. Its normal colouration is silver with faint dusky shading on the back, and may possess broken, vertical bars on its side.

The Walleye surfperch can be distinguished from other surfperch, especially the similar silver surfperch (Hyperprosopon ellipticum), by the distinctive black tips on the pelvic fins, as well as black borders on the tail and anal fins. This species can reach a length of 30.5 cm (12.0 in) in total length, but are often under 26 cm (10 in).

== Range ==
Walleye surfperch are found in the Eastern Pacific Ocean from Vancouver Island, British Columbia, Canada to Central Baja California, Mexico, including Guadalupe Island (off Northern-central Baja California).

== Biology and ecology ==
Walleye surfperch live in the surf zone along sandy beaches, near rocks, and around piers and artificial structure.

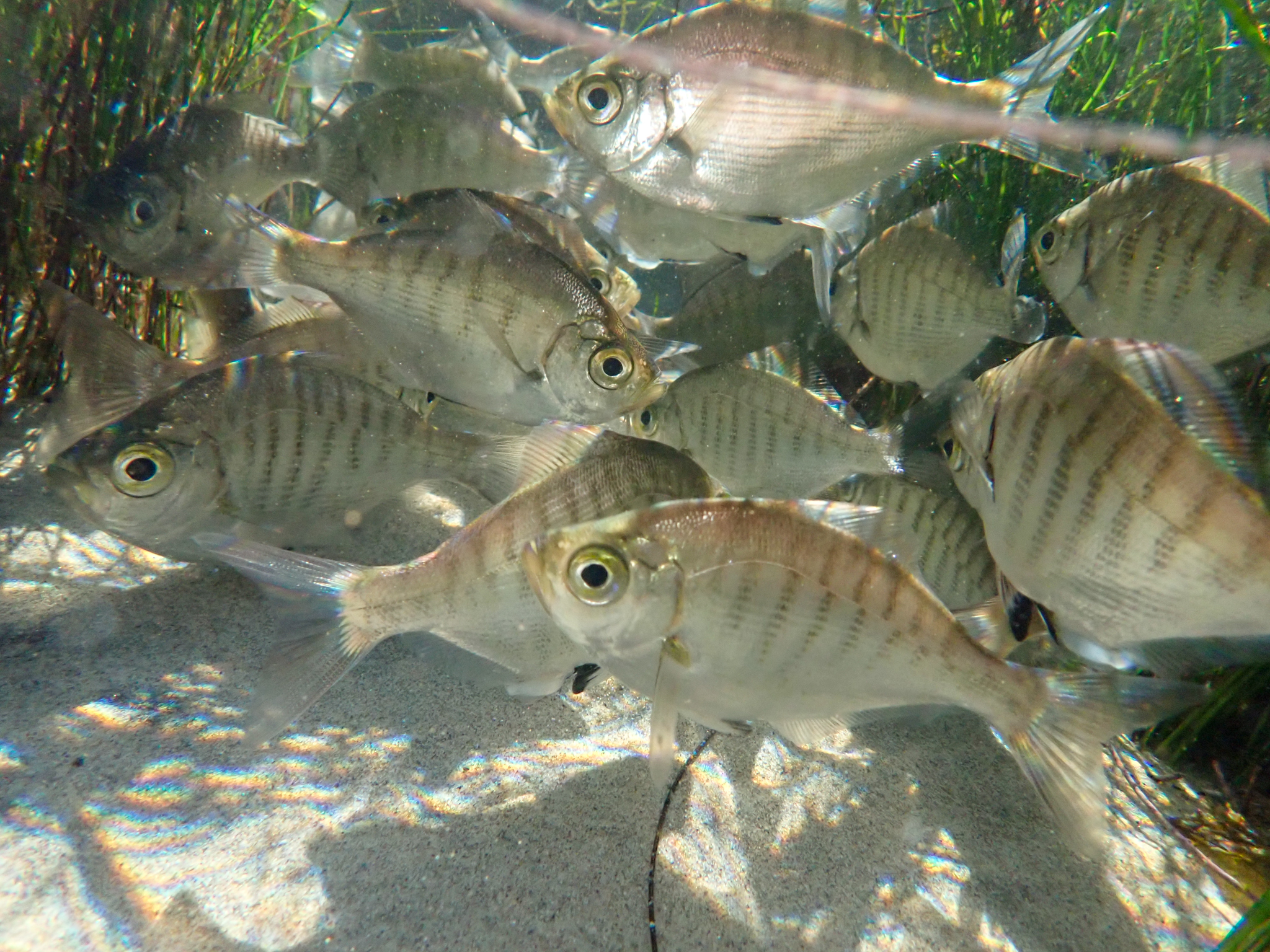
A school of walleye surfperch displaying different levels of barred patterns

Mating takes place in October, November and December when the usual dense schools disperse with the males and females pairing off. The approach of another male is immediately countered by a quick charge from the courting male toward the intruder. They are viviparous, with the females giving birth to live young. Between 1 and 19 young, depending on the size of the mother, are born the following spring. They average a little over 3.8 cm (1.5 in) in length at birth. They reach maturity the following fall and winter; in fact, the largest proportion of the breeding population appears to be young of the year.

Walleyes are probably short-lived as are most other surfperches. A 27 cm (10.5 in) inch walleye was only 6 years old. Walleye surfperch commonly occur in dense schools, sometimes with other species of surfperch.

Due to their large eyes, they are a primarily nocturnal feeder, but can also be caught during the day. They feed on small crustaceans and zooplankton.

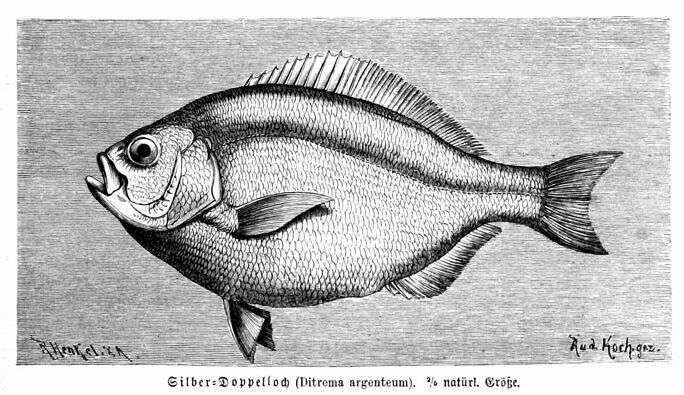
Drawing of H. Argenteum

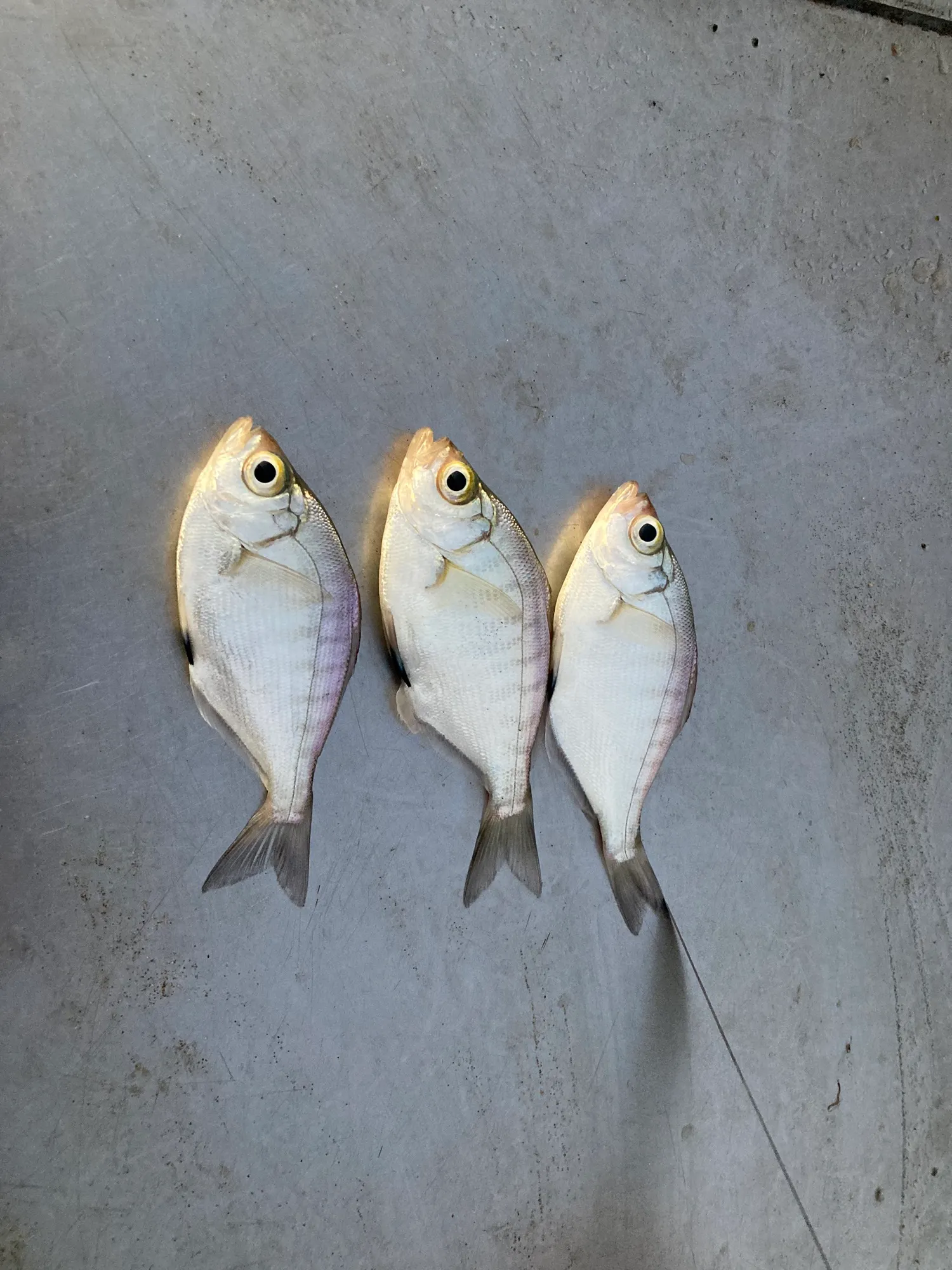
3 walleye surfperch caught at Pacifica Pier, CA

== Relation to humans ==
Walleye surfperch can be plentiful, easy to catch and occur in large numbers in surf, shore and pier catches, and are a favorite of California pier anglers. There is no major commercial market for the species, but are extremely popular in recreational fisheries. When eaten, they are most commonly fried.
