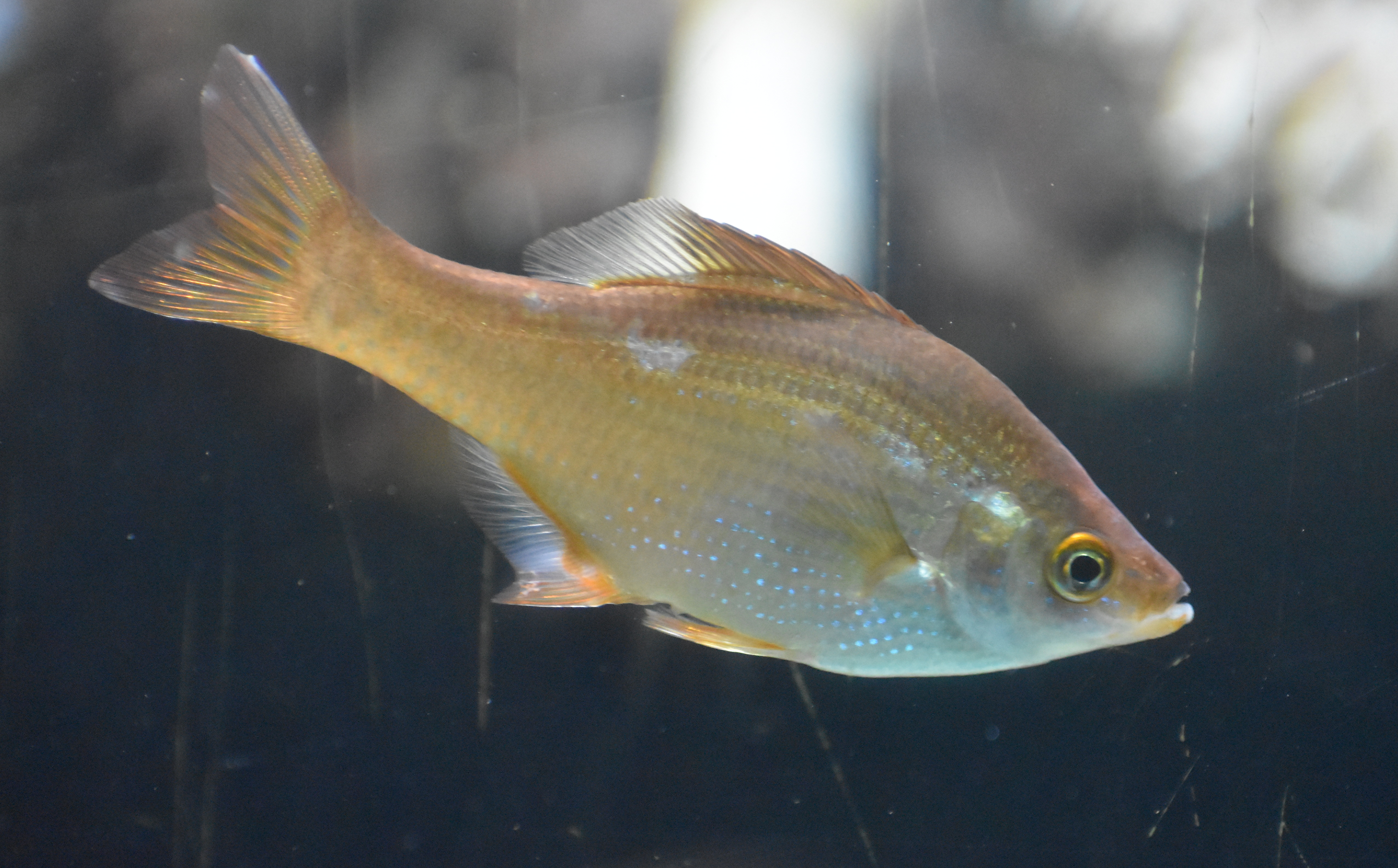

Conservation status
- Data Deficient (IUCN 3.1)

Scientific classification
- Kingdom: Animalia
- Phylum: Chordata
- Class: Actinopterygii
- Order: Blenniiformes
- Family: Embiotocidae
- Genus: Brachyistius
- Species: B. frenatus

Binomial name
- Brachyistius frenatus T. N. Gill, 1862

Synonyms
- Micrometrus frenatus (T. N. Gill, 1862); Ditrema brevipinne Günther, 1862; Brachyistius brevipinnis (Günther, 1862)

= Kelp perch =

Species of fish

Brachyistius frenatus, commonly known as the kelp perch, is a species of surfperch native to the eastern Pacific Ocean from British Columbia, Canada to Baja California, Mexico where it is found in kelp forests down to a depth of about 30 metres (98 ft). This fish is also known to be a cleaner fish. This species can reach a length of 22 centimetres (8.7 in) TL. It can also be found on display at public aquariums.
