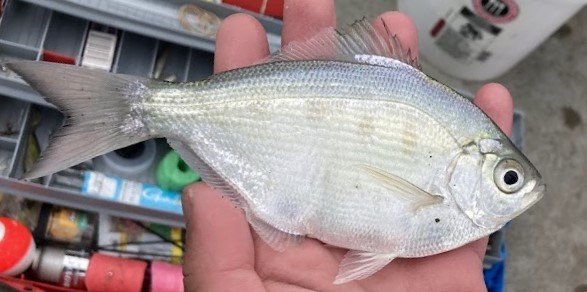

Scientific classification
- Kingdom: Animalia
- Phylum: Chordata
- Class: Actinopterygii
- Order: Blenniiformes
- Family: Embiotocidae
- Genus: Hyperprosopon
- Species: H. ellipticum

Binomial name
- Hyperprosopon ellipticum (Gibbons, 1854)

Synonyms
- Cymatogaster ellipticus Gibbons, 1854

= Silver surfperch =

Species of fish

Hyperprosopon ellipticum, the silver surfperch, is a species of surfperch native to the Eastern Pacific Ocean. They may also be known as mojarra ovalada in Mexico. They are one of two species in the genus Hyperprosopon, and one of six in the subfamily amphistichinae.

== Etymology ==
Hyperprosopon comes from the greek words "hyper" for "above" or "over," and "prosopon" for "face" or "snout," in reference to the upturned mouth of the species in the genus. The specific name ellipticum refers to its elliptical, oval-like body outline.

== Description ==
The body of the Silver surfperch is oval and strongly compressed. The head is small and the mouth is moderately large. The body is silvery with dusky (brownish to gray) coloration on the back, and can have faint dusky bars on the sides. The tail is usually pink with an occasional orange spot on the anal fin. This species can reach a length of 26.5 centimetres (10.4 in) TL, but most are under 20 centimetres (7.9 in). They can weigh up to 0.4 pounds (0.18 kg).

It looks similar to the closely related walleye surfperch (H. argenteum) but lacks the black coloration on its pelvic fins, as well as having smaller eyes and lighter fin colors.

== Range ==
Silver surfperch occur from Rio San Vicente, Northern Baja California, to Schooner Cove, near Tofino, Vancouver Island, in Southern British Columbia, but are more common in their northern regions.

== Biology and ecology ==
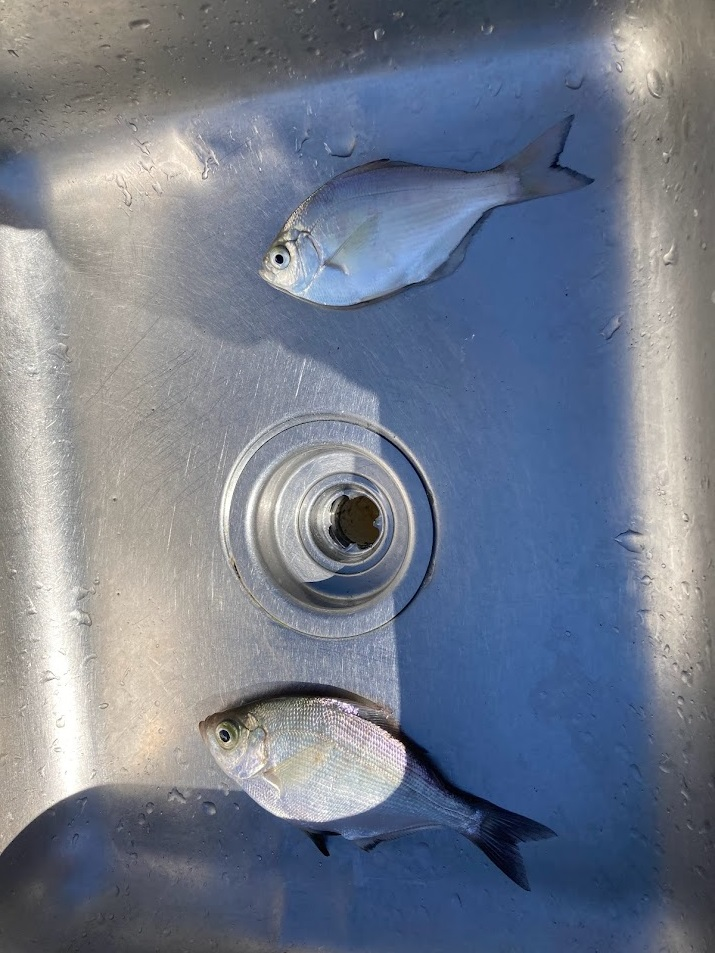
A Silver Surfperch (top) and Walleye Surfperch (bottom), both in the genus Hyperprosopon.

The diet of silver surfperch includes shrimp, small crustaceans like sand crabs, amphipods and algae, as well as small fish. These small surfperch primarily frequent the sandy surf zone although they are also found near shallow rocks, piers, and in bays. They are found at depths from the surface to 110 metres (360 ft). They often school with other species of surfperch.

As with all surfperch, the young are born alive and are relatively large. Mating occurs during the fall and early winter months. The male approaches the female from below; both swim with vents close for 2 or 3 seconds, then separate and repeat the process. Three to 17 young are born the following spring and summer. The silver surfperch is reported to live up to 7 years. Males are typically smaller and grow slower than females.

== Fishing information ==
Silver surfperch rank among the top ten in numbers caught by recreational anglers in central and Northern California, even though the average weight is often less than 0.2 pounds (91 g). They are plentiful, easy to catch, and occur in large numbers in surf, shore and pier catches. Due to their small size, there is no commercial market for the species.

This species is also displayed in public aquariums.
