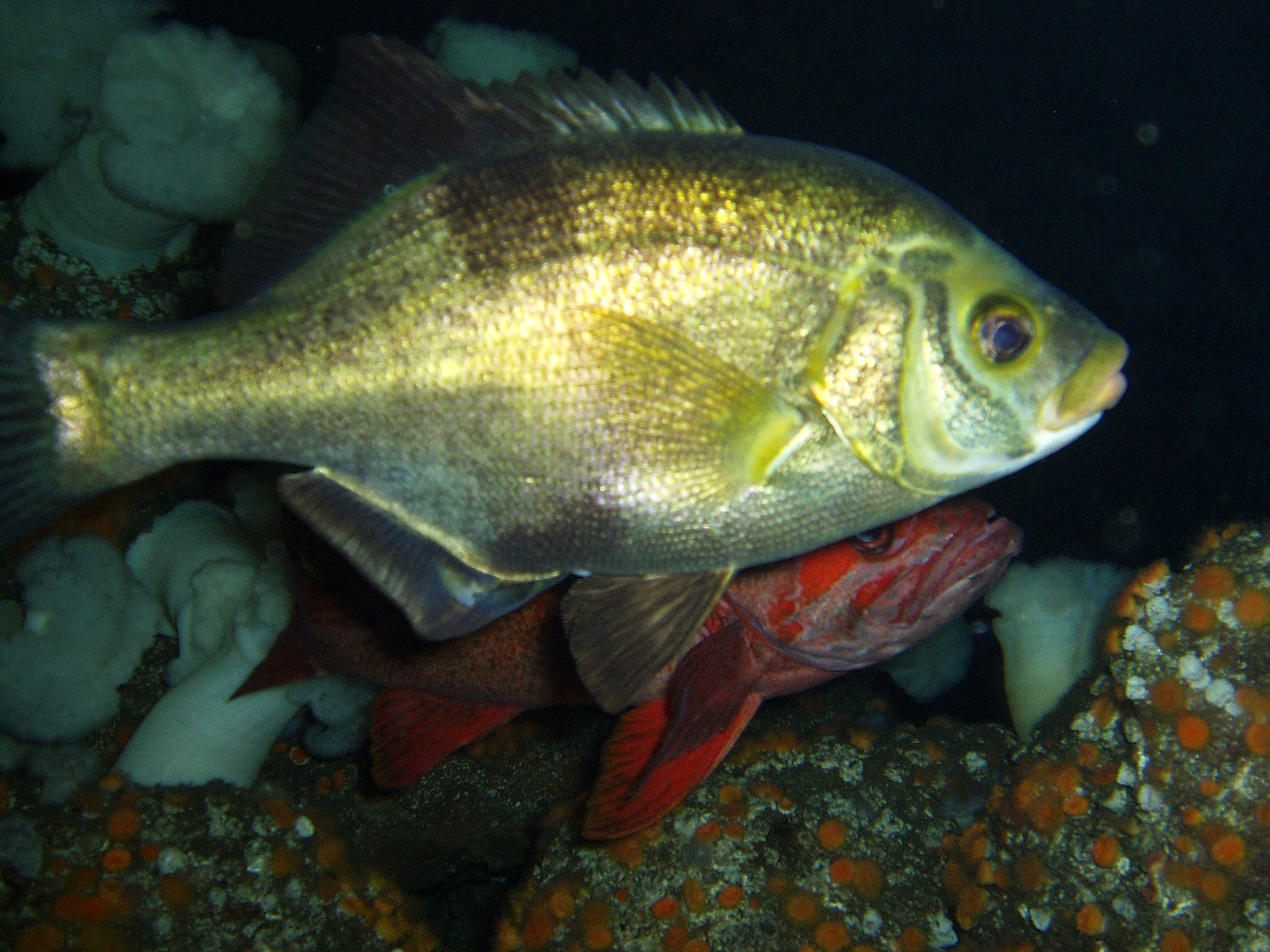

Scientific classification
- Kingdom: Animalia
- Phylum: Chordata
- Class: Actinopterygii
- Order: Blenniiformes
- Family: Embiotocidae
- Genus: Rhacochilus
- Species: R. toxotes

Binomial name
- Rhacochilus toxotes Agassiz, 1854

Synonyms
- Damalichthys toxotes

= Rhacochilus toxotes =

Species of fish

Rhacochilus toxotes, the rubberlip surfperch, is a species of surfperch found in the Eastern Pacific Ocean. They are the largest species of surfperch by weight, and second largest in length.

They are also commonly known as buttermouth perch, liverlip, rubberlip seaperch, as well as porgee and sprat in Mexico.

== Taxonomy and etymology ==
The species was first described in 1854 by Louis Agassiz, a Swiss-American naturalist. The genus name Rhacochilus was derived from the Latin word "Rhakos", meaning "big tear", and the Greek word "Cheilos" meaning "lip." Toxotes was coined due to its resemblance to the archerfish family. They are one of two species in the genus Rhacochilus.

== Description ==
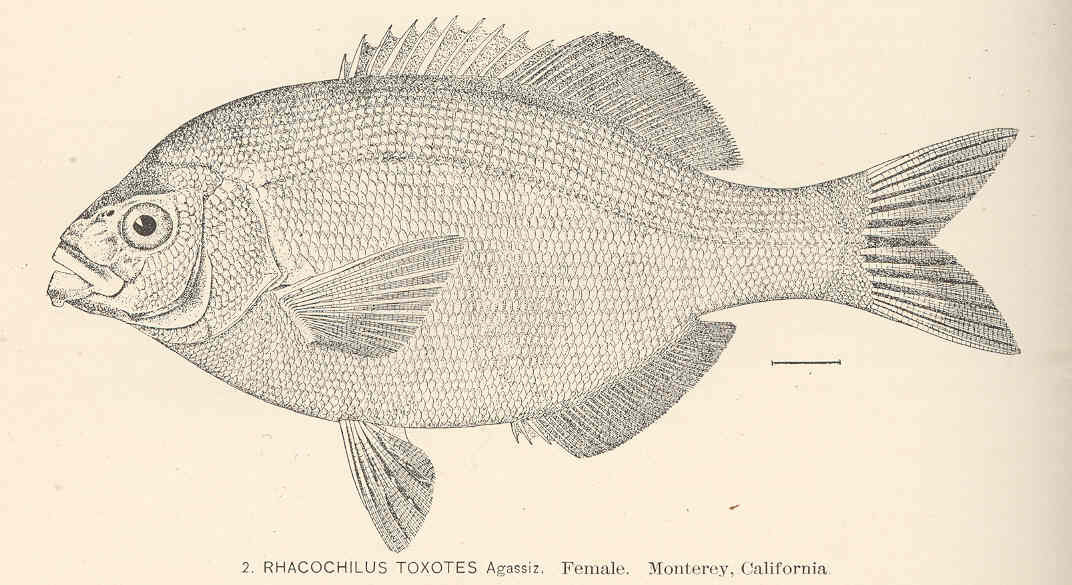
Drawing of Rhacochilus toxotes

Like other surfperch of the family Embiotocidae, it has a laterally compressed profile, and is deep bodied. As the name suggests, rubberlip surfperch are notable for having distinct, large fleshy lips that are either white or pink in color. They can also be identified by a unique black or darkened band on each side of the body that can extend from the dorsal fin to the anal fin (although not all rubberlips possess this). The general coloration of the fish is a brown-brassy color, but can also be closer to white or chrome, and even a green-grey. Juveniles may be more a more pinkish-tan. They have a prominent lateral line and the body is covered with large scales. The pectoral fins are usually the same color as the body, but can also be yellow or grey, and the lower operculum and jaw is white.

To distinguish them from the closely related pile surfperch (Rhacochilus vacca), which also possesses the black band, the first rays of the soft dorsal fin of the pile surfperch are much higher and the lips are less profound. The pile surfperch also has a small white dot at the top of their black band, which the rubberlip lacks.

They are the largest species of surfperch by weight, weighing up to 2.25 kg (5.0 lb), and second largest in length (behind the barred surfperch Amphistichus argenteus) growing to 47 cm (18.5 in) TL.

Like all surfperch, the fish is viviparous, giving birth to live, developed young. On average, they birth 20 developed young that are around 9 cm (3.5 in). Females are fertilized internally by males during the summer, at times of high algal and food abundance. They can live a maximum of 7–10 years of age.

== Habitat and ecology ==
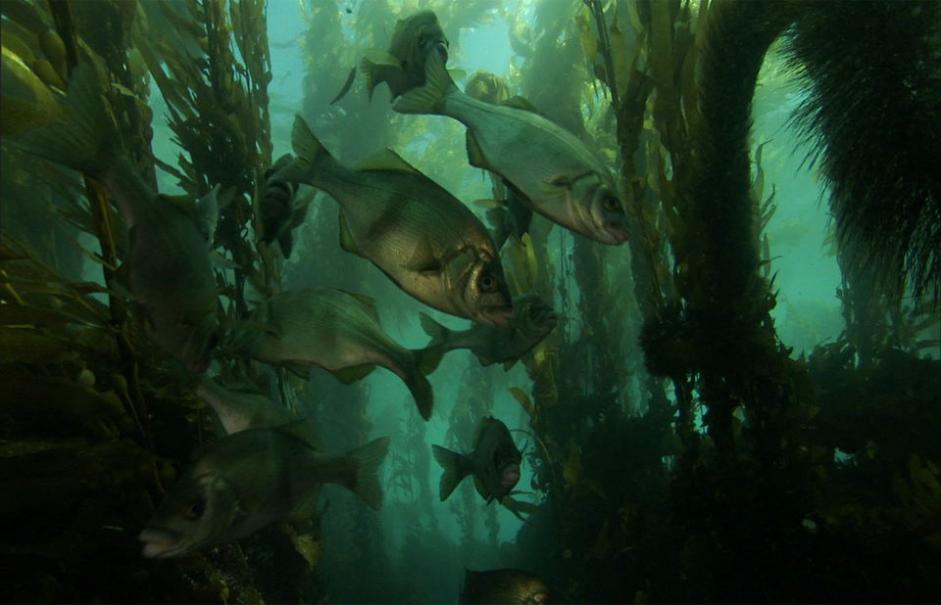
A school of rubberlip surfperch in a kelp forest

Rubberlip surfperch are found from Cabo Thurloe at the tip of the Baja California Sur to Medocino County in Northern California, and can also been seen around Guadalupe Island off Baja California. They are less common north of Monterey Bay.

It is commonly seen near rocky reefs, kelp forests and beds, exposed and protected rocky shores, as well as in bays, tidepools, and near man-made structures like piers. They range from depths of the surf zone to 50 m (160 ft), but have also been seen as deep as 80 m (260 ft), preferring to inhabit rocky areas with abundant aquatic vegetation and prey. They occasionally are observed schooling with other surfperch like the pile surfperch and striped surfperch (Embiotoca lateralis).

Rubberlip are known to feed primarily at night on thin-shelled invertebrates and crustaceans, using their large lips to help sense food while digging through sediment.

== Diet ==
Rubberlip surfperch primarily eat small invertebrates, such as gammarid amphipods, small crabs, and mollusks (bivalves such as mussels, and tiny marine snails). Juveniles also eat marine worms, including polychaetes, while adults can eat larger prey like octopus, shrimp, and larger crabs.

== Fisheries and conservation ==
Being on average relatively large, rubberlips are a prized catch for recreational shore or pier fishermen, especially in California. While having a lot of meat, the flesh has been described as soft with small flakes, but has a generally average taste. There is no significant targeted commercial fishery for the species as they are often found closer to shore, and may on occasion be taken incidentally during fishing operations.

The conservation status of the rubberlip surfperch has not yet been assessed. However, like other surfperch, they are vulnerable to harvest during gestation, as larger fish are often pregnant.
