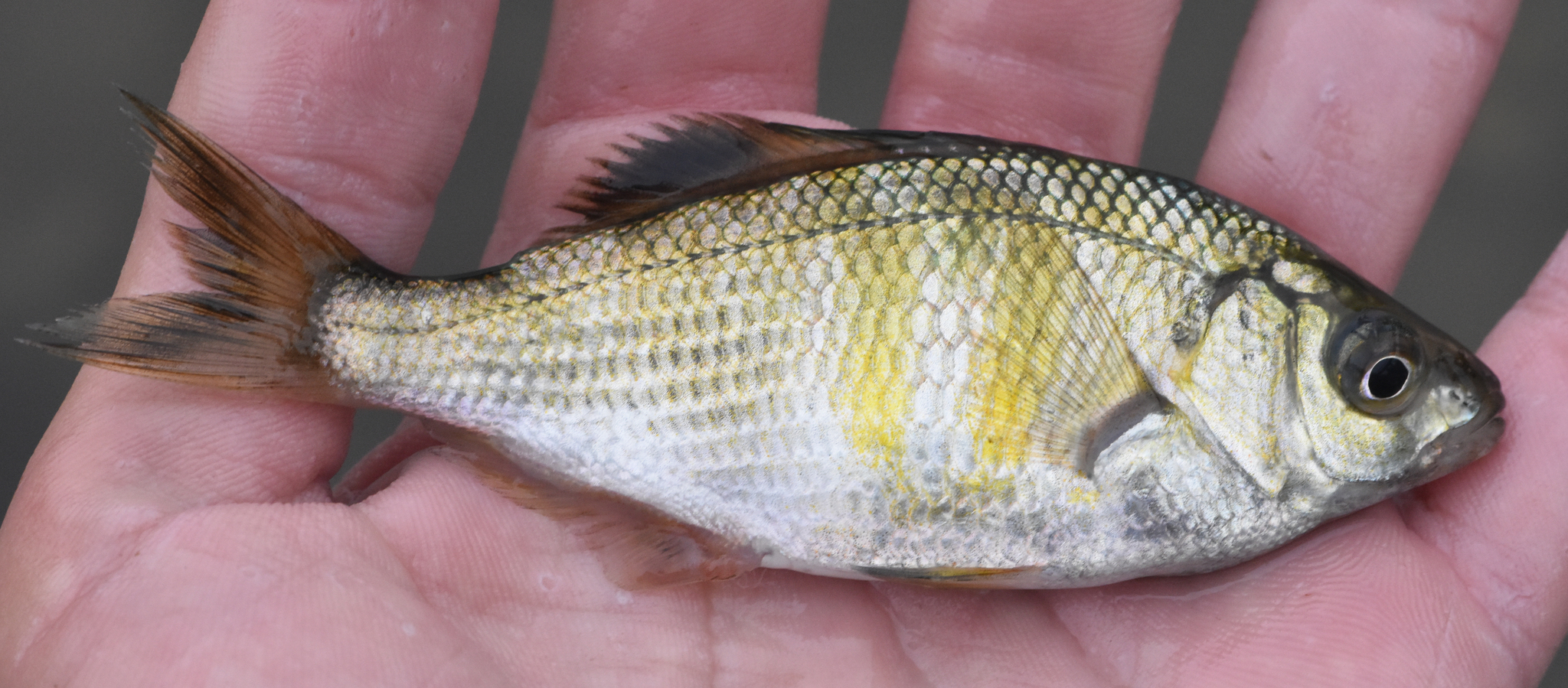
- Male, in British Columbia
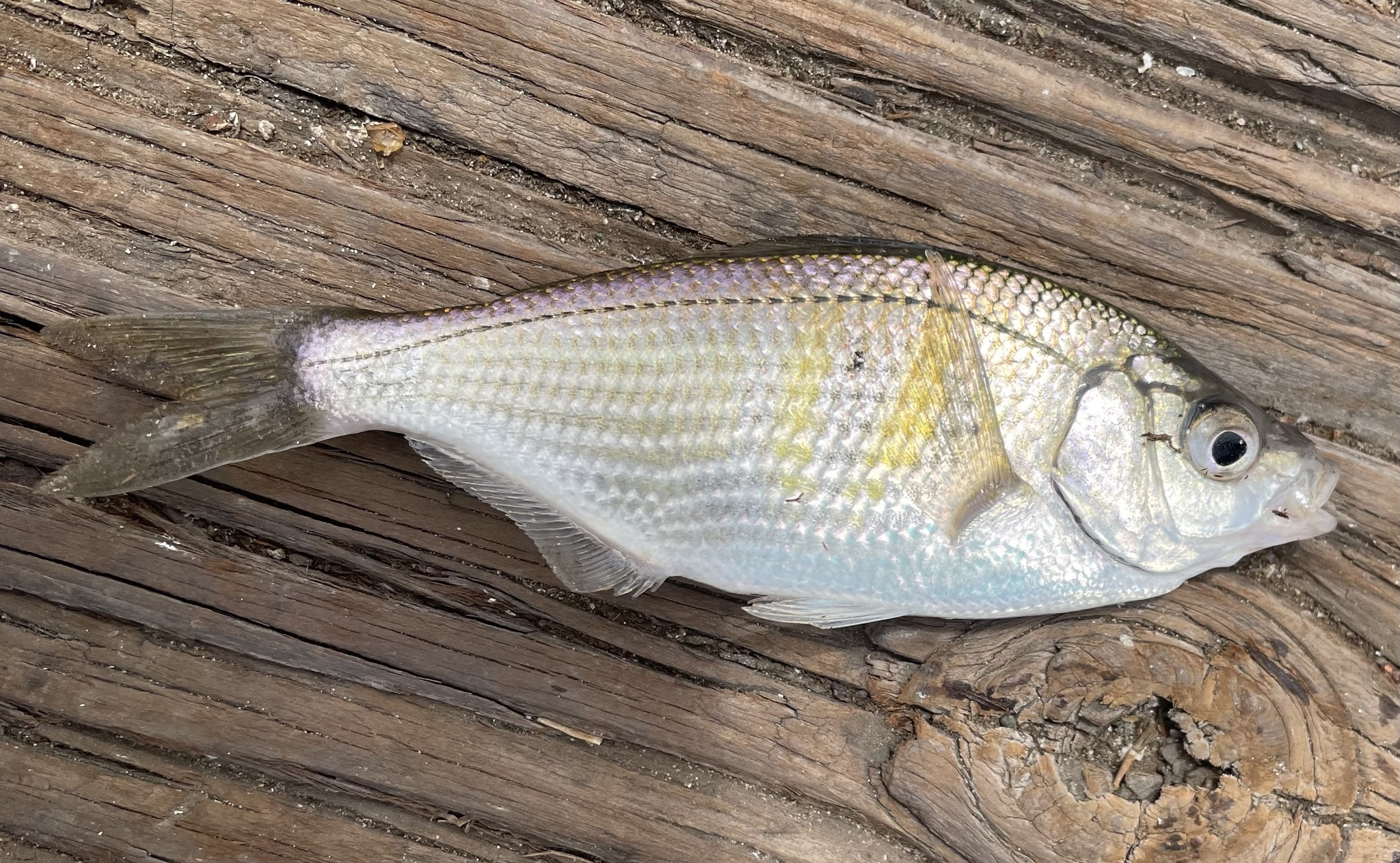
- Female, in California

Conservation status
- Least Concern (IUCN 3.1)

Scientific classification
- Kingdom: Animalia
- Phylum: Chordata
- Class: Actinopterygii
- Division: Teleostei
- Order: Blenniiformes
- Family: Embiotocidae
- Genus: Cymatogaster
- Species: C. aggregata

Binomial name
- Cymatogaster aggregata Gibbons, 1854

Synonyms
- Metrogaster lineolatus Agassiz, 1861; Cymatogaster gracilis Tarp, 1952

= Shiner perch =

Species of fish

The shiner perch (Cymatogaster aggregata) is a common surfperch found in estuaries, lagoons, and coastal streams along the Pacific coast from Alaska to Baja California. It is the sole member of its genus. The shiner perch is also known as seven-eleven and shiner seaperch.

== Distribution ==
Shiner perch range from Punta Baja, Northern Baja California, to Saint John Baptist Bay near Sitka in Southeastern Alaska.

== Habitat ==
It is one of the most common fish in the bays and estuaries of its range, favoring beds of eelgrass, and often accumulating around piers as well. While typically residing in shallow waters, it has been observed at depths up to 120 metres (390 ft). It can also live in brackish waters.

== Description ==
Shiner perch is similar to tule perch; it is deep-bodied with a dusky greenish back and silvery sides that have a pattern combining fine horizontal bars with three broad yellow vertical bars. Breeding males turn almost entirely black, the barred pattern being obscured by dark speckles. Shiner perch is distinguished from tule perch by having fewer dorsal fin spines, just 8–9 vs the 15–19 of the tule perch. The rayed part of the dorsal fin has 18 to 23 rays. The anal fin has 3 spines followed by 22–25 rays.

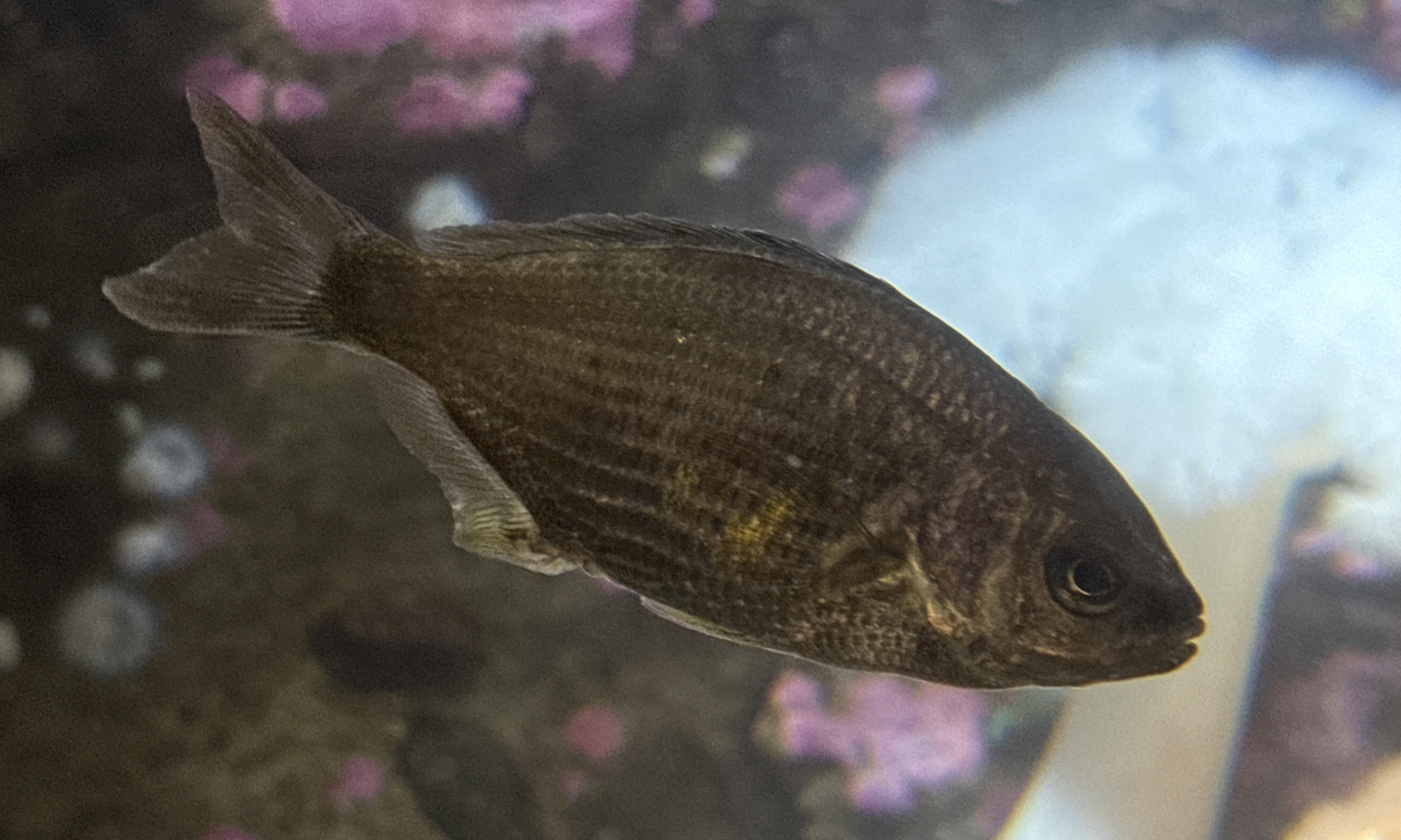
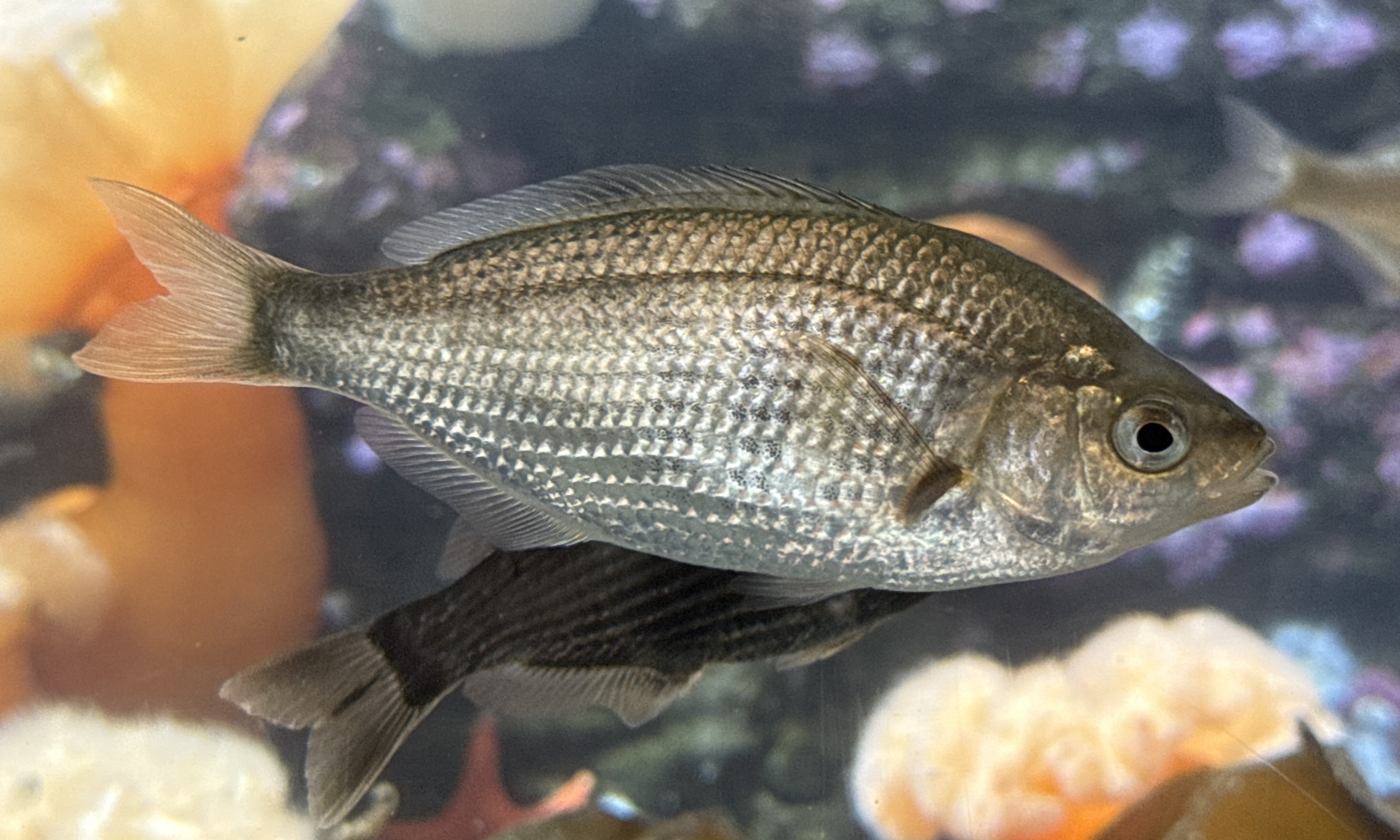
Male in breeding colouration (top and bottom background) and female (bottom), showing differences in the anal fins. At the Vancouver Aquarium.

Shiner perch can reach a maximum length of 21 centimetres (8.3 in), but are most commonly under 10–15 centimetres (3.9–5.9 in) in total length. Shiner perch mature soon after birth, but females often wait until one year of age before spawning. Breeding males can turn almost completely black.

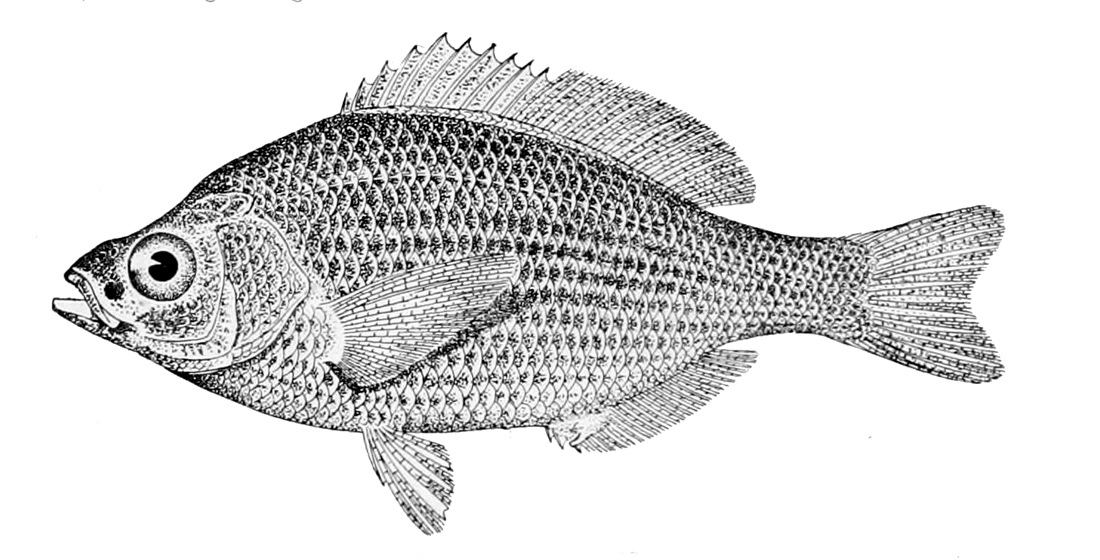
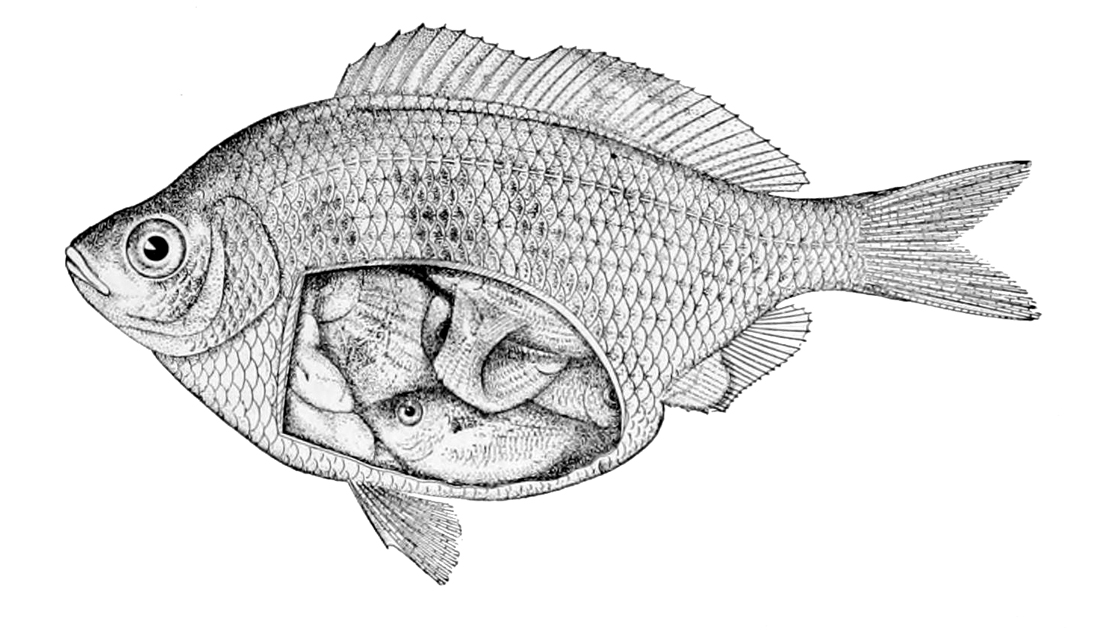
Male in breeding colouration (left), and female pregnant with young (right)

== Diet ==
It primarily feeds on zooplankton such as copepods and gammarid amphipods, but has also been observed to feed on bottom species like small crustaceans, marine worms, and mollusks. It also feeds on fish eggs.

== Fishery ==
Due to its small size, there is a very limited targeted fishery for the shiner perch, and it is usually taken incidentally or for bait. They are one of the most commonly caught fish out of West Coast piers, and are a popular catch for beginner anglers. The shiner perch is often also used in East-Asian and other ethnic dishes, fried whole or dried out.

== Effects of water pollution ==
The Regional Monitoring Program for Water Quality in San Francisco Bay has tested shiner perch tissue for contaminants, and found elevated levels of mercury and PCBs that make it unsafe for human consumption. As a result, the California Office of Environmental Health Hazard Assessment (OEHHA) has issued health advisories, encouraging people to avoid or reduce consumption of shiner perch and several other fish species from the Bay.

== Parasitism ==
It is often found with parasitic isopods such as Elthusa californica, feeding off of them from their opercular cavity of the gill chamber.
