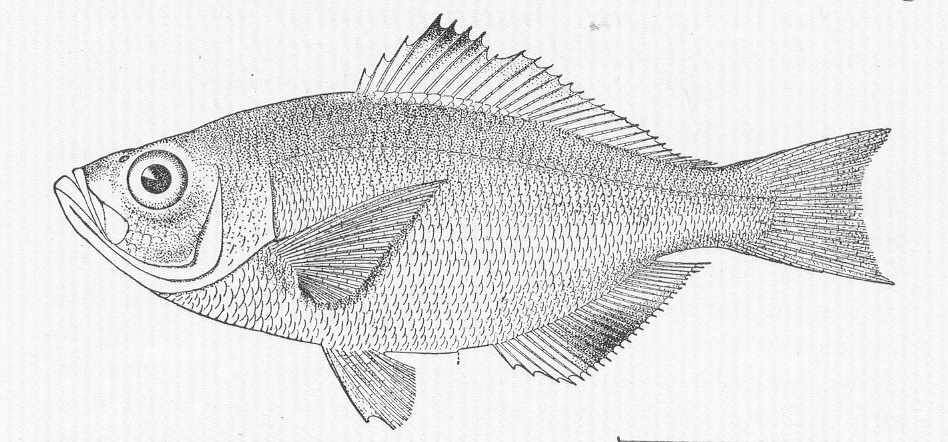

Scientific classification
- Kingdom: Animalia
- Phylum: Chordata
- Class: Actinopterygii
- Order: Blenniiformes
- Family: Embiotocidae
- Genus: Hypocritichthys; Gill, 1862
- Species: H. analis

Binomial name
- Hypocritichthys analis (Agassiz, 1861)

Synonyms
- Hyperprosopon anale Agassiz, 1861

= Spotfin surfperch =

Species of fish

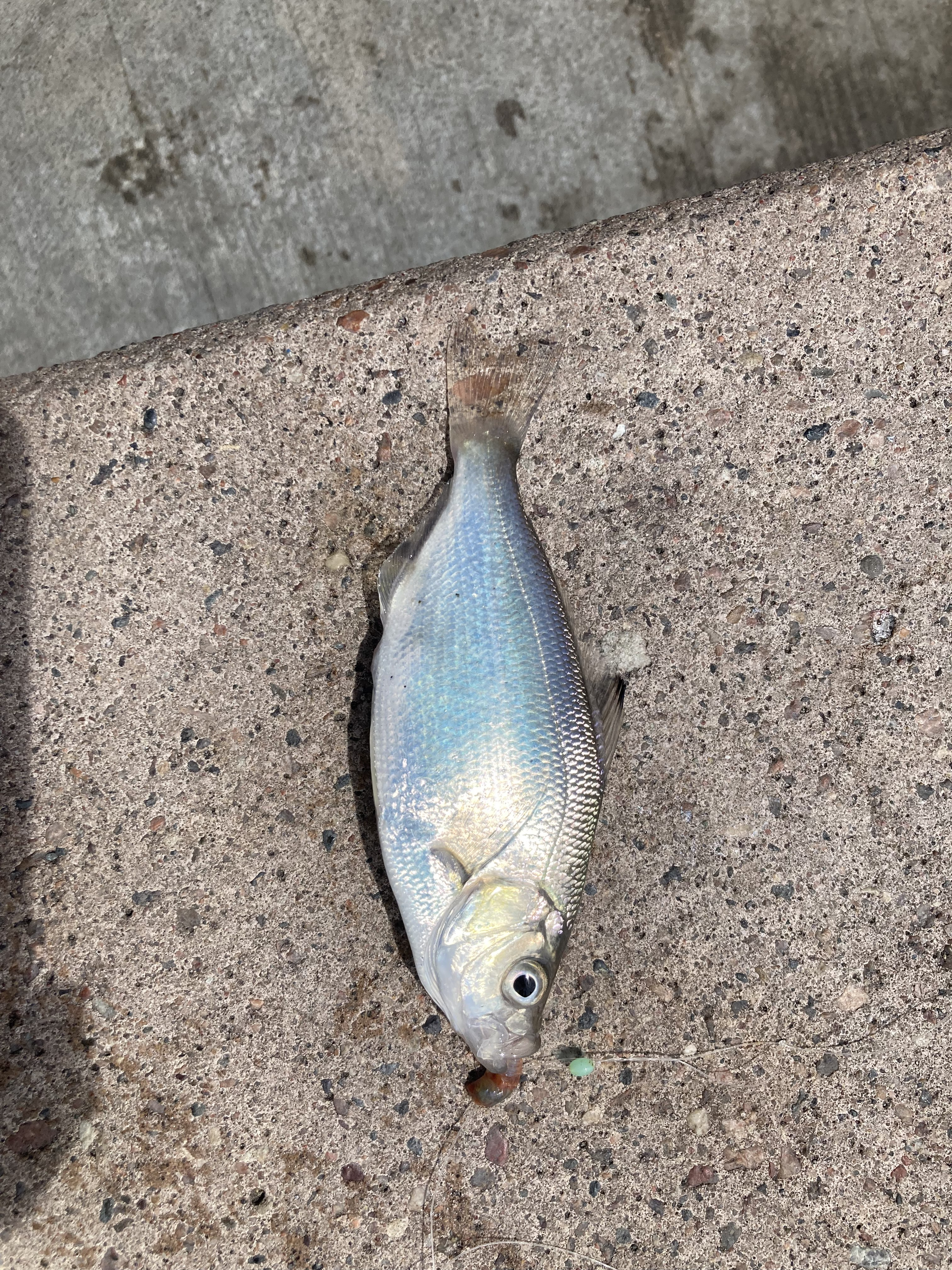
A spotfin surfperch caught at Pacifica Pier in May 2023

The spotfin surfperch (Hypocritichthys analis) is a species of ray-finned fish from the surfperch family Embiotocidae. In Mexico they may be referred to as mojarra aletimanchada.

== Taxonomy ==
The spotfin surfperch was previously placed in the genus Hyperprosopon as Hyperprosopon anale until it was placed in its own monotypic genus in 2018. Still, it resides in the subfamily Amphistichinae along with Hyperprosopon and Amphisticus.

== Description ==
The spotfin surfperch is a relatively small species of surfperch, reaching a total length of 20 cm (7.9 in), although are more common around 14 cm (5.5 in).

The body is relatively elongated, especially compared to species in the related Hyperprosopon. The mouth is small and slightly upturned. The body is silvery, with a more dusky back that can be purpleish.The dorsal fin has 8 spines and 13 to 15 rays, while the anal fin has three spines and 21-22 soft rays.

Notably, it is identified by the distinctive dark blotches at the front of the dorsal and middle of the anal fin, which is the namesake of the species.

== Range ==
It occurs along the western coast of North America from Oregon to Baja California, but are most common around central California.

== Biology and ecology ==
Spotfin surfperch are often found with other species of surfperch in the subfamily Amphistichinae in sandy zones with breaking waves. The spotfin can be found as deep as 101 m (331 ft), but is more common in shallow nearshore areas.

Spotfin surfperch are viviparous, with the juveniles being fertilized and developing inside the mother. The young are birthed between June and August fully formed and able to swim. The amount of young birthed depends on the size and age of the female. Males may grow slower than females.

They feed primarily on small crustaceans and zooplankton.
