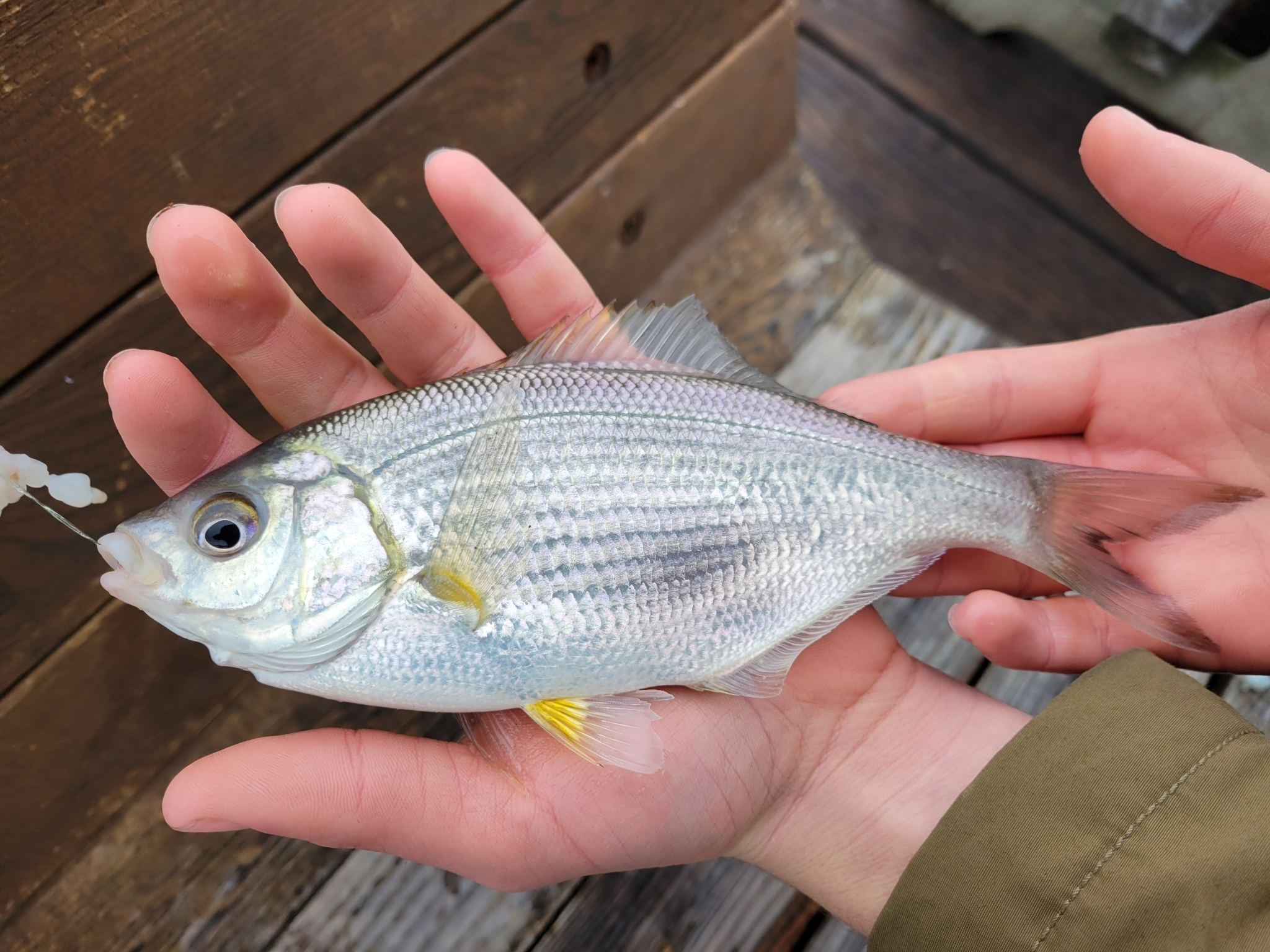
- Phanerodon furcatus

Scientific classification
- Domain: Eukaryota
- Kingdom: Animalia
- Phylum: Chordata
- Class: Actinopterygii
- Order: Blenniiformes
- Family: Embiotocidae
- Genus: Phanerodon; Girard, 1854

Type species
- Phanerodon furcatus Girard, 1854

= Phanerodon =

Genus of fishes

Phanerodon is a genus of surfperches native to the eastern Pacific Ocean.

== Species ==
There are currently three recognized species in this genus:

- Phanerodon atripes (D. S. Jordan & C. H. Gilbert, 1880) – sharpnose surfperch
- Phanerodon furcatus Girard, 1854 – white surfperch
- Phanerodon vacca (Girard, 1855) – pile perch
