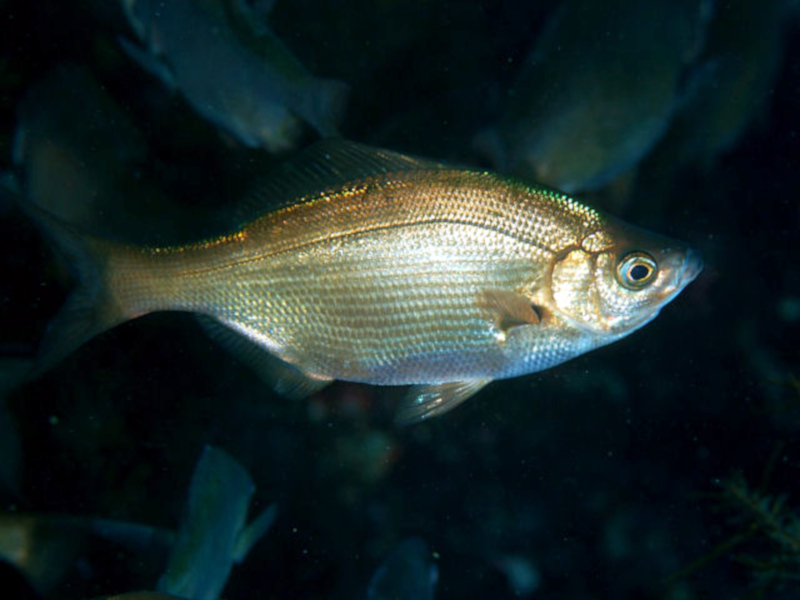

Scientific classification
- Kingdom: Animalia
- Phylum: Chordata
- Class: Actinopterygii
- Division: Teleostei
- Order: Blenniiformes
- Family: Embiotocidae
- Genus: Neoditrema; Steindachner, 1883
- Species: N. ransonnetii

Binomial name
- Neoditrema ransonnetii Steindachner, 1883

= Neoditrema =

Species of fish

Neoditrema ransonnetii is a species of surfperch native to the Pacific coasts of Korea and Japan. This species grows to a length of 13 centimetres (5.1 in) FL. This species is the only known member of its genus. The specific name honours the Austrian diplomat, painter, lithographer, biologist and explorer Eugen von Ransonnet-Villez (1838–1926), who obtained the type specimens in Japan.
