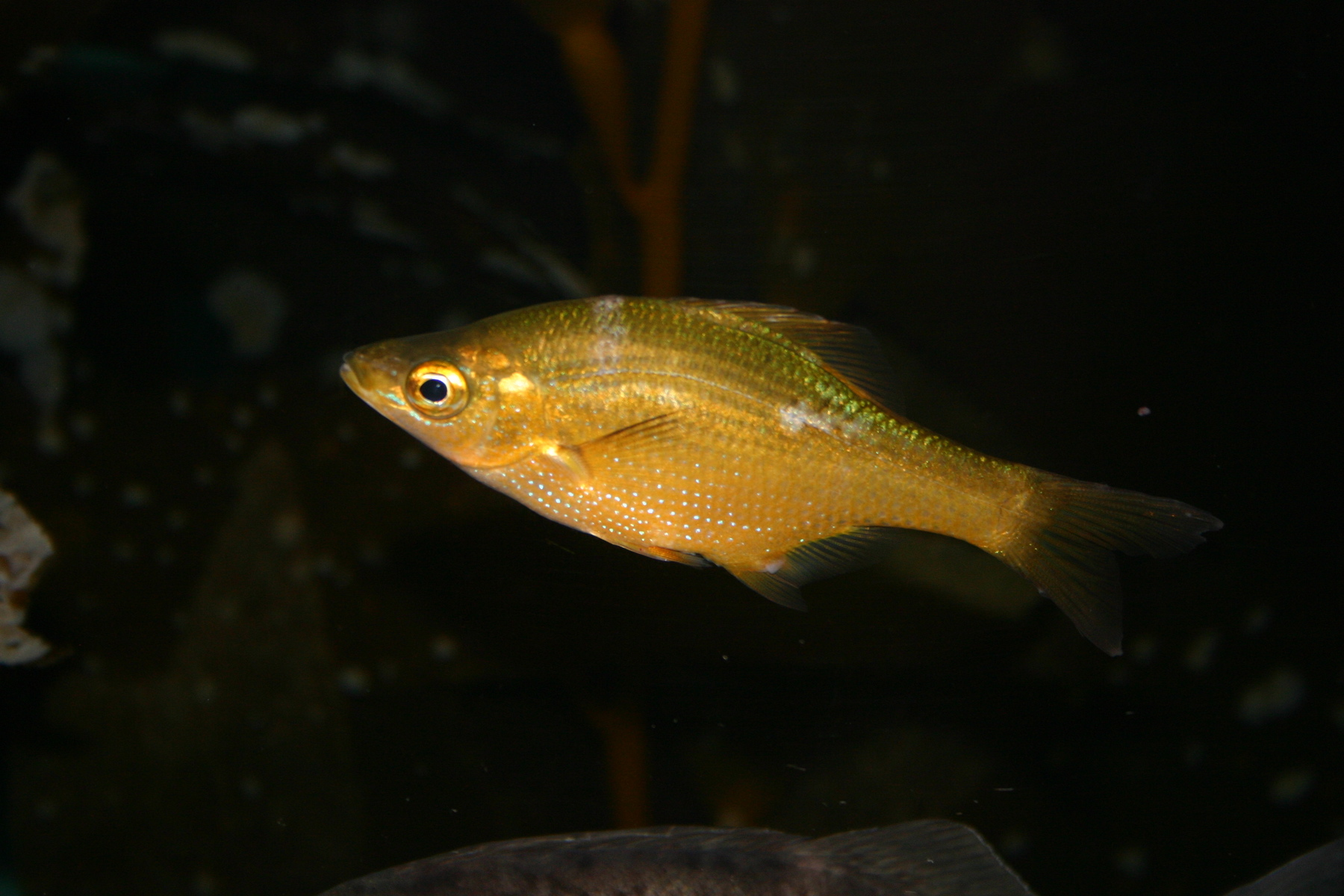
- Brachyistius frenatus

Scientific classification
- Domain: Eukaryota
- Kingdom: Animalia
- Phylum: Chordata
- Class: Actinopterygii
- Clade: Ovalentaria
- Order: Blenniiformes
- Family: Embiotocidae
- Genus: Brachyistius; T. N. Gill, 1862

Type species
- Brachyistius frenatus T. N. Gill, 1862

= Brachyistius =

Genus of fishes

Brachyistius is a genus of surfperches native to the eastern Pacific Ocean.

== Species ==
There are currently two recognized species in this genus:

- Brachyistius aletes (Tarp, 1952)
- Brachyistius frenatus T. N. Gill, 1862 (Kelp perch)
