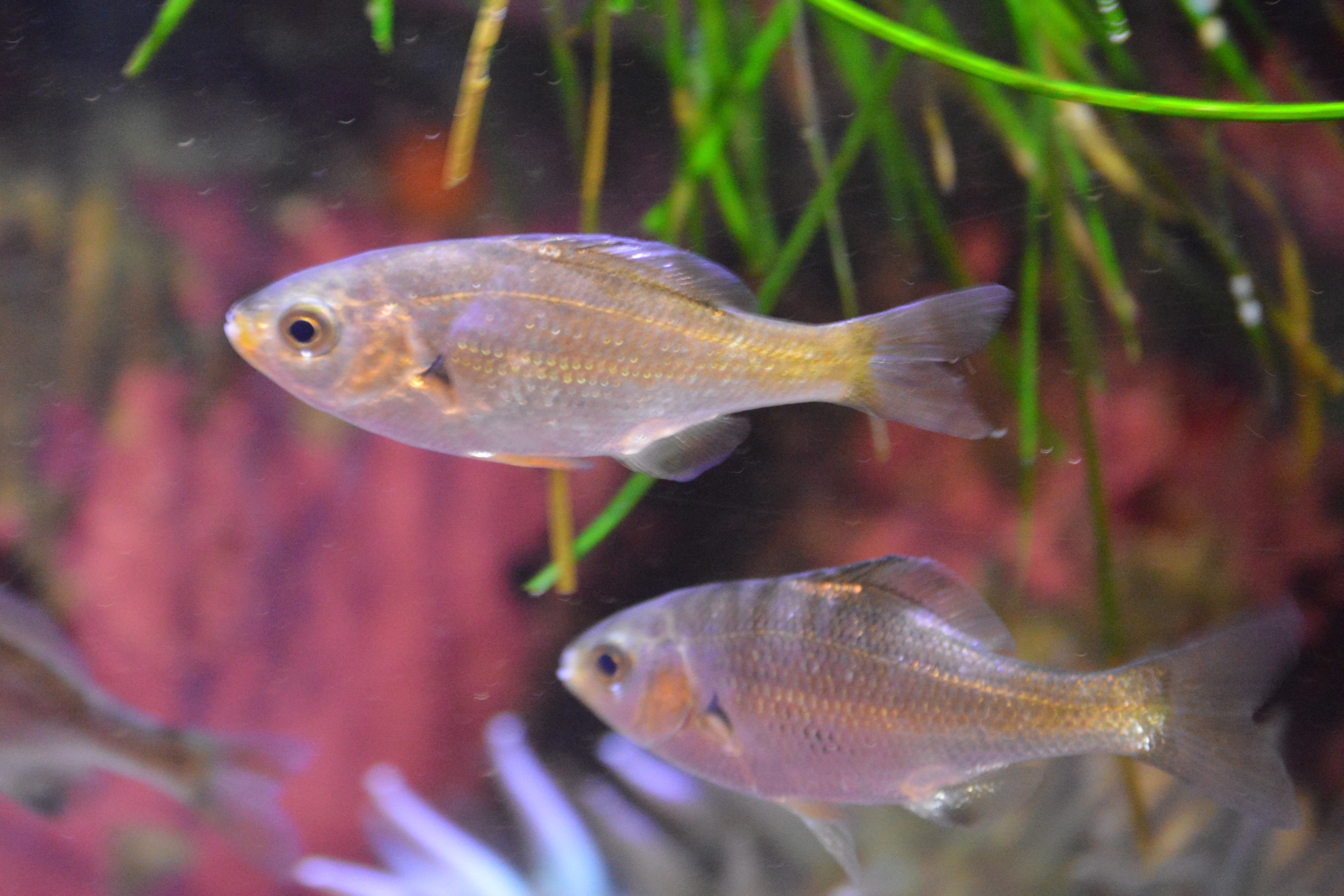
- M. aurora
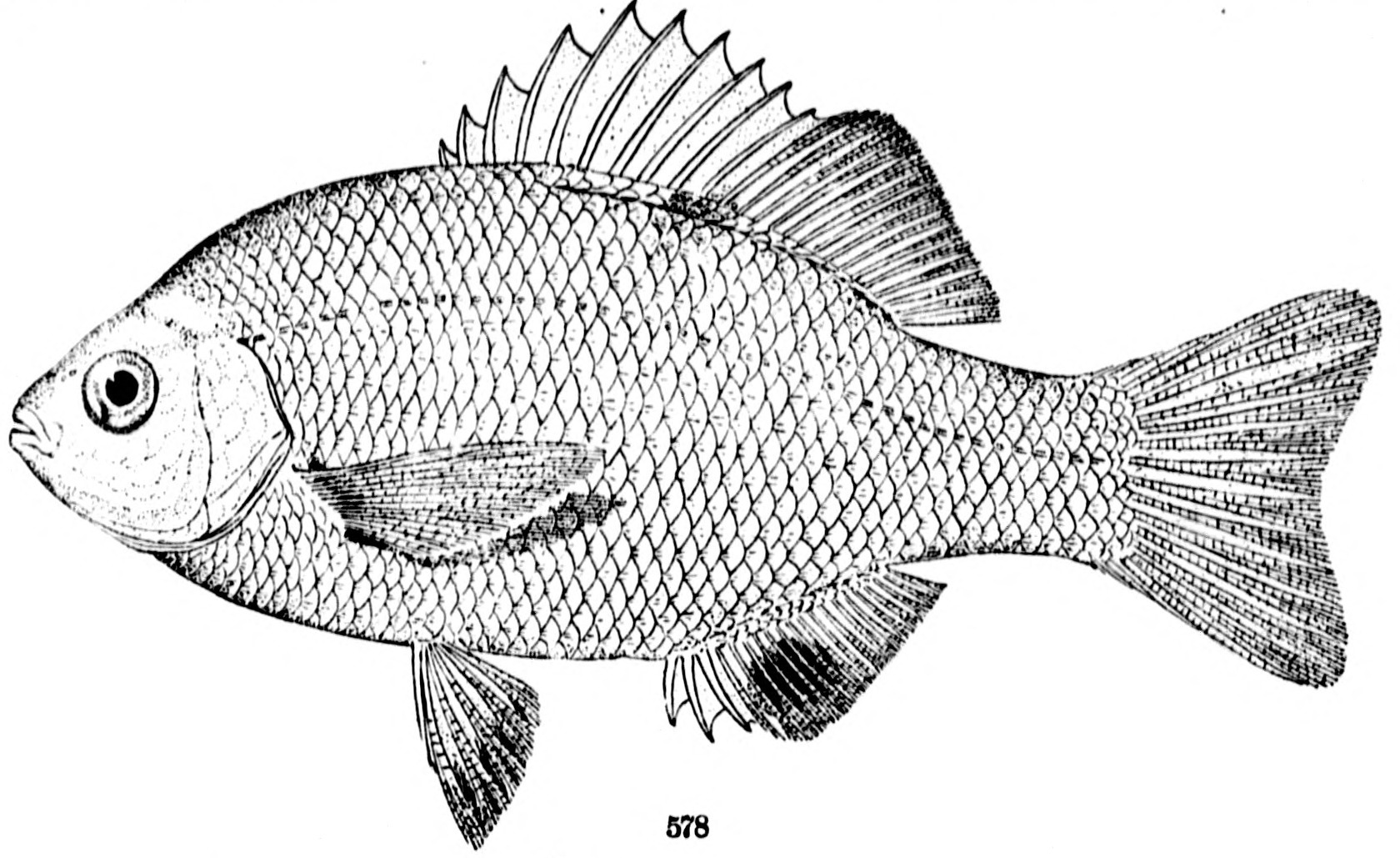
- M. minimus

Scientific classification
- Kingdom: Animalia
- Phylum: Chordata
- Class: Actinopterygii
- Order: Blenniiformes
- Family: Embiotocidae
- Genus: Micrometrus; Gibbons, 1854

Type species
- Cymatogaster minimus Gibbons, 1854

= Micrometrus =

Genus of fishes

Micrometrus is a genus of surfperches native to the eastern Pacific Ocean.

== Species ==
There are currently two recognized species in this genus:

- Micrometrus aurora (D. S. Jordan & C. H. Gilbert, 1880) (Reef perch)
- Micrometrus minimus (Gibbons, 1854) (Dwarf perch)
