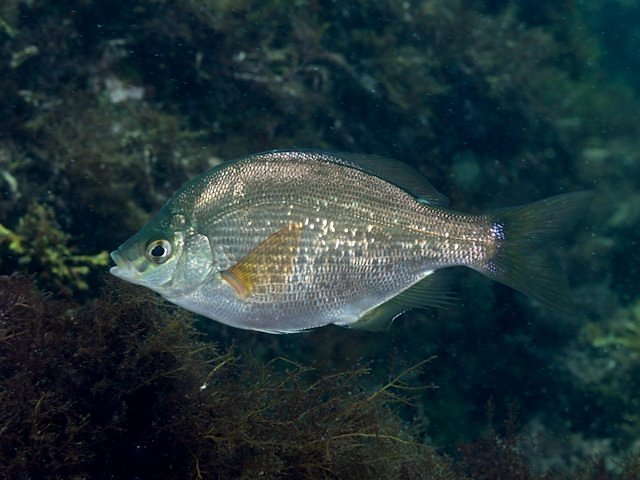
- Ditrema temminckii

Scientific classification
- Kingdom: Animalia
- Phylum: Chordata
- Class: Actinopterygii
- Clade: Ovalentaria
- Order: Blenniiformes
- Family: Embiotocidae
- Genus: Ditrema; Temminck & Schlegel, 1844

Type species
- Ditrema temminckii Bleeker, 1853

= Ditrema =

Genus of fishes

Ditrema is a genus of surfperches native to the northwestern Pacific Ocean.

== Species ==
There are currently three recognized species in this genus:

- Ditrema jordani V. Franz, 1910
- Ditrema temminckii Bleeker, 1853
  - Ditrema temminckii pacificum Katafuchi & Nakabo, 2007
  - Ditrema temminckii temminckii Bleeker, 1853
- Ditrema viride Ōshima, 1940
