= Pink surfperch =

Conservation status
- Least Concern (IUCN 3.1)

Scientific classification
- Kingdom: Animalia
- Phylum: Chordata
- Class: Actinopterygii
- Order: Blenniiformes
- Family: Embiotocidae
- Genus: Zalembius; Jordan & Evermann, 1896
- Species: Z. rosaceus

Binomial name
- Zalembius rosaceus (D. S. Jordan & C. H. Gilbert, 1880)

Species of fish

The pink surfperch (Zalembius rosaceus), or pink seaperch, is a species of surfperch native to the eastern Pacific Ocean from Point Delgada, California, United States to southern Baja California. It is also present in the Gulf of California. This species is an offshore member of the surfperch family (the Embiotocidae), and occurs at depths of from 8 to 229 metres (26 to 751 ft). The Pink surfperch grows to a length of 20 centimetres (7.9 in) TL. It is the only known member of its genus.
