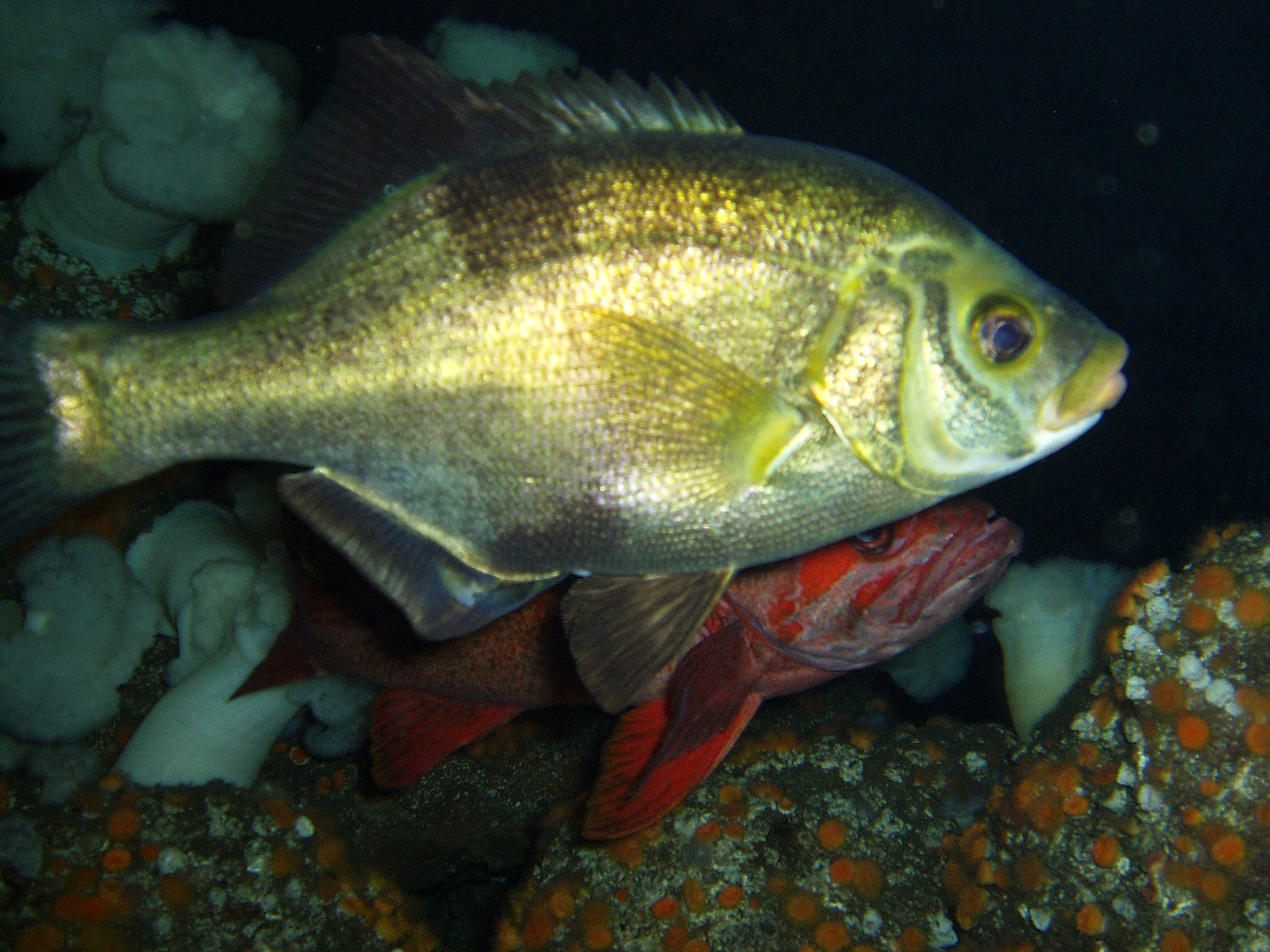
- Rhacochilus toxotes
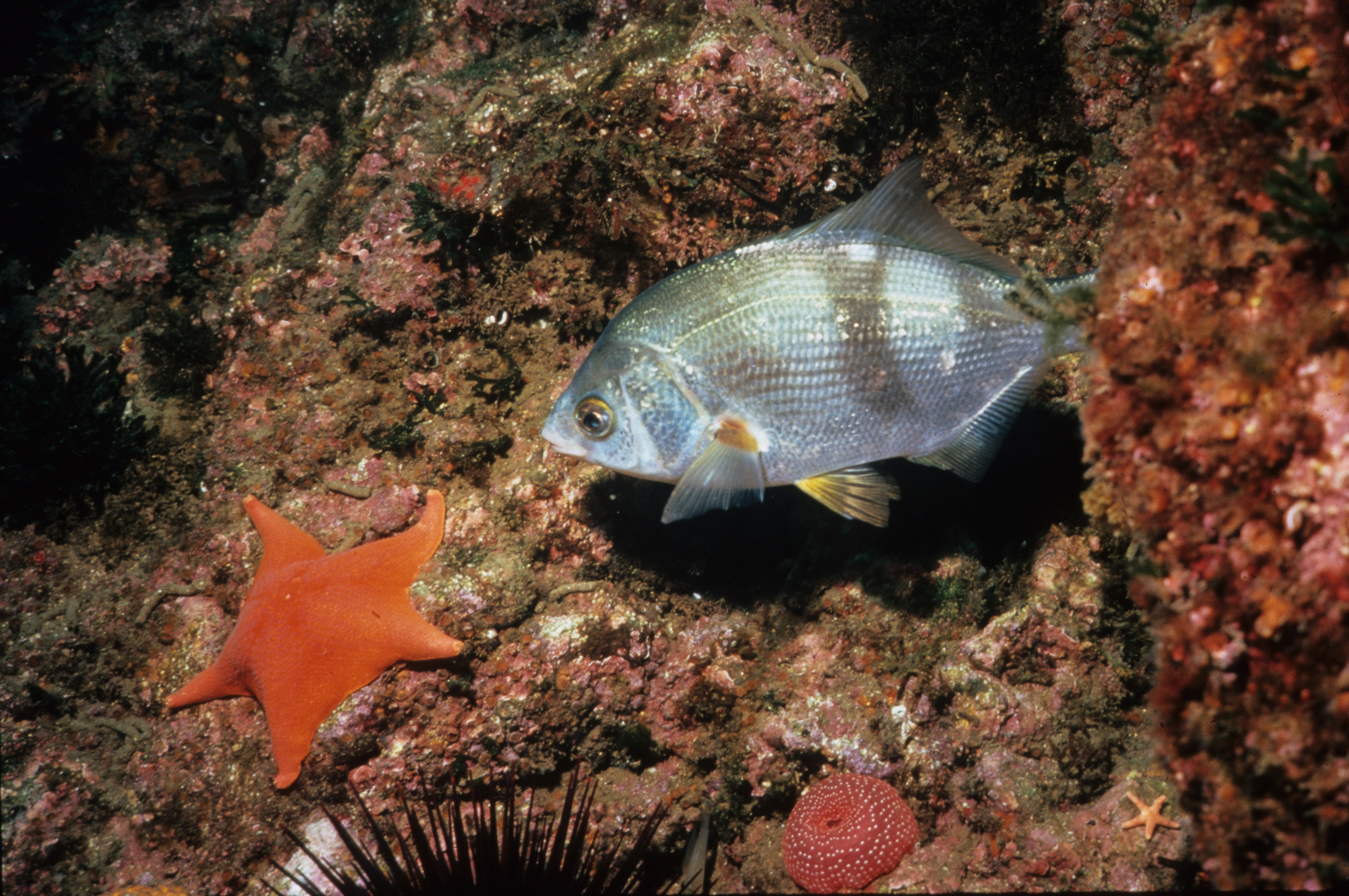
- Rhacochilus vacca

Scientific classification
- Kingdom: Animalia
- Phylum: Chordata
- Class: Actinopterygii
- Order: Blenniiformes
- Family: Embiotocidae
- Genus: Rhacochilus; Agassiz, 1854

Type species
- Rhacochilus toxotes Agassiz, 1854

= Rhacochilus =

Genus of fishes

Rhacochilus is a genus of surfperches native to the eastern Pacific Ocean.

== Species ==
There are currently two recognized species in this genus:

- Rhacochilus toxotes Agassiz, 1854 (Rubberlip surfperch)
- Rhacochilus vacca (Girard, 1855) (Pile perch)
