= Eriquius =

Eriquius Temporal range: Upper Miocene

Scientific classification
- Kingdom: Animalia
- Phylum: Chordata
- Class: Actinopterygii
- Order: Blenniiformes
- Family: Embiotocidae
- Genus: †Eriquius; Jordan, 1924
- Species: †E. plectrodes

Binomial name
- †Eriquius plectrodes Jordan, 1924

Extinct genus of fishes

Eriquius is an extinct genus of prehistoric surfperch that lived along the coast of western North America during the Upper Miocene subepoch. It contains a single species, E. plectrodes from the Tortonian-aged diatomite beds of the Monterey Formation in California, US.

It is the only known fossil genus of the Embiotocidae in the fossil record, alongside the much younger freshwater species Damalichthys saratogensis. It has also been suggested that it may belong to the butterfish instead, but most recent studies have retained it as a surfperch. It has been suggested that the time period during which it occurred was one of great diversification for the surfperches.

== See also ==
- Prehistoric fish
- List of prehistoric bony fish
