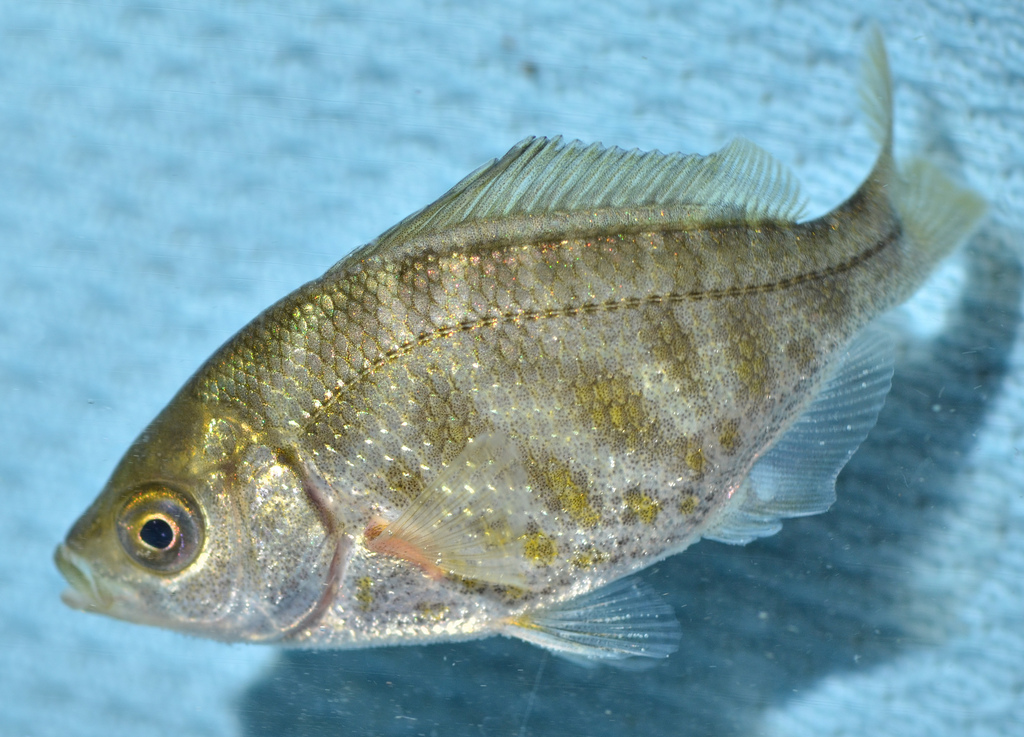
- Hysterocarpus traskii pomo

Conservation status
- Least Concern (IUCN 3.1)

Scientific classification
- Kingdom: Animalia
- Phylum: Chordata
- Class: Actinopterygii
- Division: Teleostei
- Order: Blenniiformes
- Family: Embiotocidae
- Genus: Hysterocarpus; Gibbons, 1854
- Species: H. traskii

Binomial name
- Hysterocarpus traskii Gibbons, 1854

Synonyms
- Hysterocarpus traski Gibbons, 1854

= Tule perch =

Species of fish

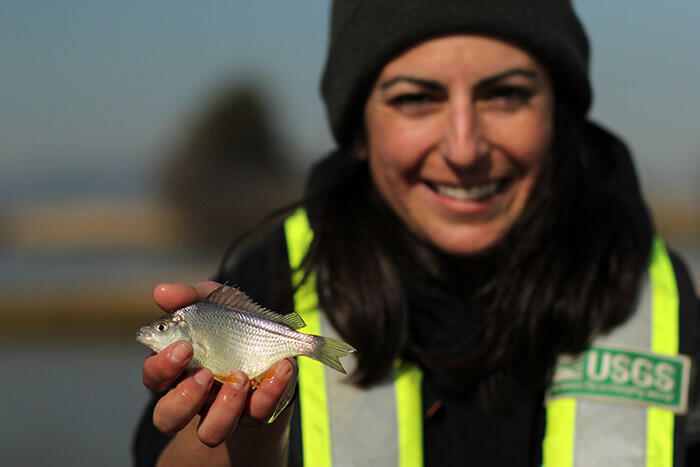
The California native tule perch grows to around 15 cm in standard length, with some growing up to 22 cm in standard length.

The tule perch (Hysterocarpus traskii) is a surfperch (Embiotocidae) native to the rivers and estuaries of central California. It is the sole member of its genus, and the only freshwater surfperch. It has three subspecies: the Russian River tule perch (H. t. pomo), the Clear Lake tule perch (H. t. lagunae), and the Sacramento tule perch (H.t. traskii).

== Anatomy ==
One distinguishing characteristic is a pronounced hump (referred to as a nuchal concavity) located in front of the dorsal fin, which is more pronounced in adults than juveniles. They have a terminal mouth that allows them to effectively feed on small invertebrates in the midwater column and on bottom substrates.

The tule perch has a contrasting coloration on its back (dorsal side) that looks blueish or purple, while the belly (ventral side) looks more whitish or yellow. The barring pattern varies with patterns of broad-barred, un-barred, and narrow-barred. The dorsal fin has 15 to 19 spines and 9 to 15 rays. There are 3 spines on the anal fin and 20 to 26 rays, with the pectoral fin having 17 to 19 rays. There are 38-43 scales along the lateral line.

The juveniles are more streamlined and thinner than the adults, along with having proportionately larger eyes. The juveniles are usually found in larger groups and tend to stay in areas with vegetative cover. In contrast, the adults tend to hunt and swim in smaller groups and will venture out to areas without protective cover.

The tule perch is similar to the shiner perch (Cymatogaster aggregata) in its appearance and the two species may be confused with one another. Both species are found in estuaries, but the shiner perch has three yellowish vertical bars, whereas the tule perch tends to have darker and less distinct barring.

The Sacramento Perch (Archoplites interruptus) is another species that may be confused with the tule perch because both species are found in similar California habitats and have similar body types. However, the Sacramento perch is larger and has more of a green-purple color. The Sacramento perch also lacks the distinct hump between the head and dorsal fin, which is a key distinguishing feature of the tule perch.

== Habitat ==
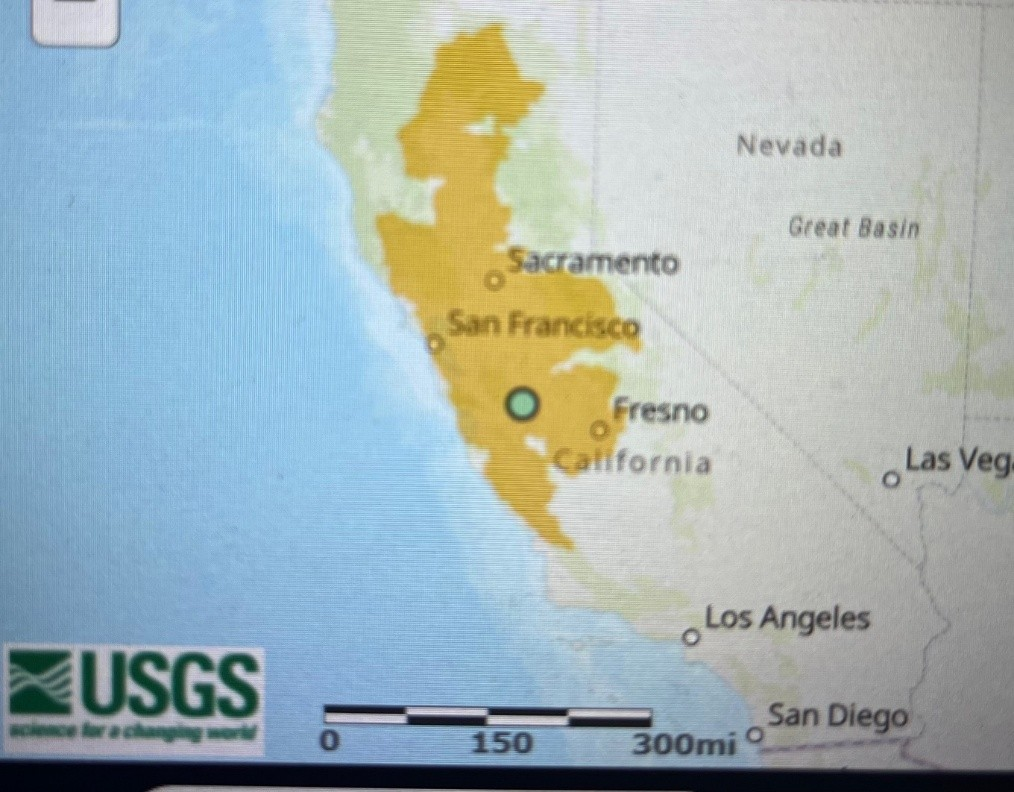
Tule perch (Hysterocarpus traskii) distribution in California as of 2025.

Tule perch live in streams, rivers, lakes, and estuaries of northern and central California. In general, they are found in cold, oxygenated water below 22 °C and are rarely seen in waters that exceed 25 °C. A 1990 study showed that the tule perch has limited tolerance and ability to adapt to changing oxygen and temperature conditions. However, they can tolerate high levels of salinity and have been seen in waters with salinity at levels of 30 ppt. They commonly share habitats with other native fishes and form schools or shoals.

Tule perch search for food along the bottom of streams and rivers where they eat invertebrates, zooplankton, and plants. They also favor lake floors that are composed of sand and gravel and will travel into the deeper parts of lakes. One passive mark and recapture study showed that tule perch spent more of their time in intertidal channels, except during the spring breeding season. Generally, as the quality and quantity of habitat has decreased, the abundance of tule perch has been negatively impacted.

Tule perch are categorized into three subspecies. A 1981 study demonstrated that tule perch populations in three different California drainages were significantly distinct. The three subspecies of Hysterocarpus traskii are: Hysterocarpus traskii lagunae (found in the Clear Lake drainage), the Hysterocarpus traskii pomo (found in the Russian River drainage), and Hysterocarpus traskii traskii (found in the Sacramento-San Joaquin River drainage.)

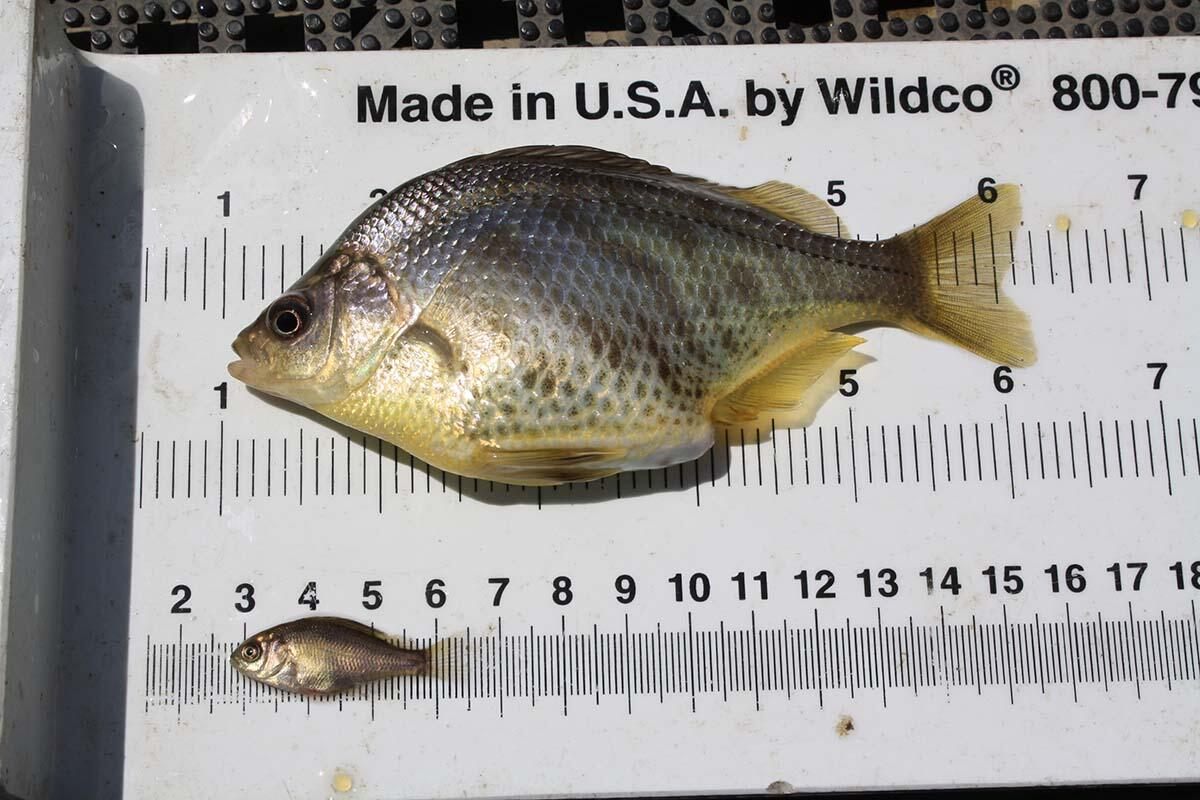
Adult female tule perch with her recently born baby. Both fish were collected in 2011 on Liberty Island, a tidally flooded habitat in the Sacramento-San Joaquin Delta.

== Life cycle ==
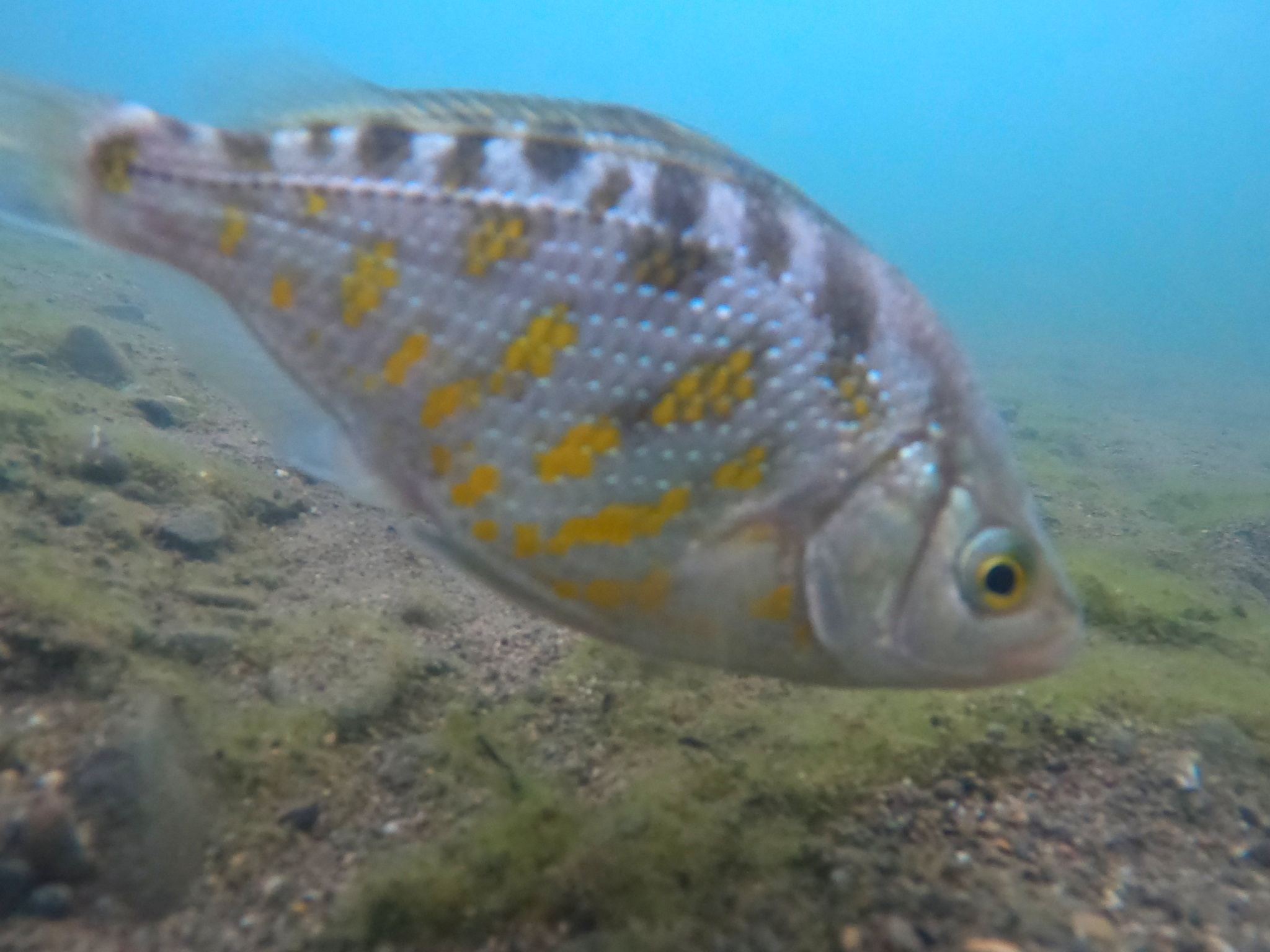
H. t. pomo

The unique tule perch is the only native, freshwater California fish species that reproduces through viviparity. The females give birth annually to between 10 and 60 live young that are fully formed and miniature versions of the adult. The number of offspring produced varies based on the size of the mother and the environment. Larger females tend to have more babies. Females living in more variable environments produce more young, while females living in more stable environments produce fewer numbers of young. After the live, free-swimming offspring are born in May or June, the juveniles stay together in clusters in areas with vegetative cover.

Tule perch grow rapidly during the first year of life. Some of their main food sources include aquatic insects, crabs, shrimp, clams, and chironomid midges. As they become adults, they expand their range and defend their territory during the breeding season, which typically runs July through September. The females often breed with many different males during this period. A 2013 study found that multiple paternity occurred 92% of the time, with mate encounter rate serving as a significant factor that affects multiple mating. Males inject sperm into the females with their modified anal spine.

The females use fertilization delay, so that the injected sperm from the male is stored inside her body, with fertilization not occurring until January. The babies develop in a uterus-like pouch inside the ovary and get their nourishment from the mother's bodily fluids. Most of the baby's growth occurs in the last two months of gestation. When the delayed fertilization process is included, gestation can last up to 9 months. The young are born between 3–5 cm long. Some tule perch can live up to 8 years, but most don't live beyond 5 years.

The three subspecies of tule perch reach sexual maturity at different times.

- The Russian River tule perch (Hysterocarpus traskii pomo) becomes sexually mature during its first year and generally has a shorter lifespan of between 3–4 years.
- The Hysterocarpus traskii traskii (found in the Sacramento-San Joaquin River drainage) reaches sexual maturity at the end of its first year, with most living up to 5 years. A 2020 study showed that Hysterocarpus traskii traskii have sexual dimorphism, with the females appearing more narrow through the caudal peduncle and also exhibiting anal fins located more posteriorly than the males. While there was no difference in the standard length between the males and females, the males tended to be significantly heavier than the females.
- The Clear Lake tule perch (Hysterocarpus traskii lagunae) become sexually mature during their second or third year, and tend to live a total of 6–7 years, which is the longest of the three subspecies.

== Importance to humans ==
Anglers fish for tule perch in the Russian River, San Luis Reservoir, and Suisun Marsh. Native American archaeological records show that tule perch were culturally significant, with tule perch remains being identified in what is now Contra Costa County, San Joaquin County, Merced County, Kings County, Kern County, and San Luis Obispo County. As climate change leads to warmer waters, tule perch may struggle to adapt, since they have a low critical thermal maxima (or a minimal ability to respond to changes in environmental temperatures) with their lowest critical thermal maxima recorded at 30 °C. However, of the 23 species of surfperches that make up the Embiotocidae family, tule perch have the highest fecundity, which is beneficial for adapting to highly seasonal freshwater environments.

== Conservation status ==
Each of the three tule perch subspecies has a different conservation status:

- The Russian River tule perch was listed as a species of Special Concern in 1995 by the California Department of Fish and Wildlife. Since they require vegetative cover and can't tolerate turbid conditions, they are susceptible to changes in flows, which can lead to high mortality rates. Other factors that contribute to low abundance numbers include limited distribution, short life span, and degradation of the Russian River water quality and aquatic habitat. The Warm Spring Dam and Coyote Valley Dam control the flows into the Russian River, which has led to increasing turbidity and decreased water quality. There is a need for a consistent monitoring program to determine the current population trends of the Russian River tule perch.
- The Clear Lake subspecies (confined to Clear Lake and to Upper and Lower Blue lakes in Lake County) was listed as a species of High Concern in 2015 by California Department of Fish and Wildlife. Although there are no precise abundance estimates, the California Department of Fish and Wildlife reports that populations have declined. A study that examined a late Prehistoric Pomo archaeological site near Clear Lake showed that tule perch historically made up one of the highest numbers of identifiable remains.
- • The Sacramento-San Joaquin River subspecies is found in a variety of habitats, including the primary rivers, tributary streams, tidally influenced sloughs, and impoundments. The International Union for Conservation of Nature (IUCN) lists the subspecies conservation status as “Least Concern." However, California Department of Fish and Wildlife reports that declines in populations have been linked to factors including habitat alteration, poor water quality, chemicals, and competition with introduced fish; reduced abundance has also been linked to predation.

== Historical background ==
The formal description of the tule perch was first read by W. P. Gibbons at a meeting of the California Academy of Natural Sciences on May 15, 1854, and then published in the San Francisco newspaper The Daily Placer Times and Transcript on May 18, making it a rare case of a new species being published in a newspaper rather than book or scientific journal. Gibbons chose the genus name Hysterocarpus "womb-fruit" referring to the livebearing common to all surfperches. The specific name honours John B. Trask (1824–1879), a friend of William P. Gibbons. Trask was a physician and amateur geologist, and a founding member of the California Academy of Sciences.
