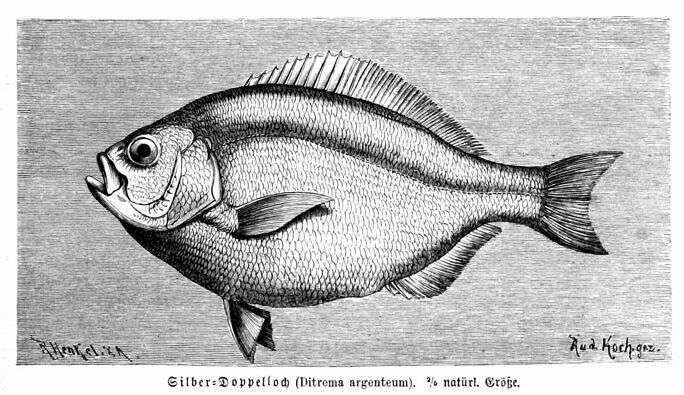
- Hyperprosopon argenteum

Scientific classification
- Kingdom: Animalia
- Phylum: Chordata
- Class: Actinopterygii
- Clade: Ovalentaria
- Order: Blenniiformes
- Family: Embiotocidae
- Genus: Hyperprosopon; Gibbons, 1854

Type species
- Hyperprosopon argenteus Gibbons, 1854

= Hyperprosopon =

Genus of fishes

Hyperprosopon is a genus of surfperches native to the eastern Pacific Ocean. This genus is part of the subfamily Amphistichinae, containing six total species.

== Species ==
There are currently two recognized species in this genus:

- Hyperprosopon argenteum Gibbons, 1854 (Walleye surfperch)
- Hyperprosopon ellipticum Gibbons, 1854 (Silver surfperch)
