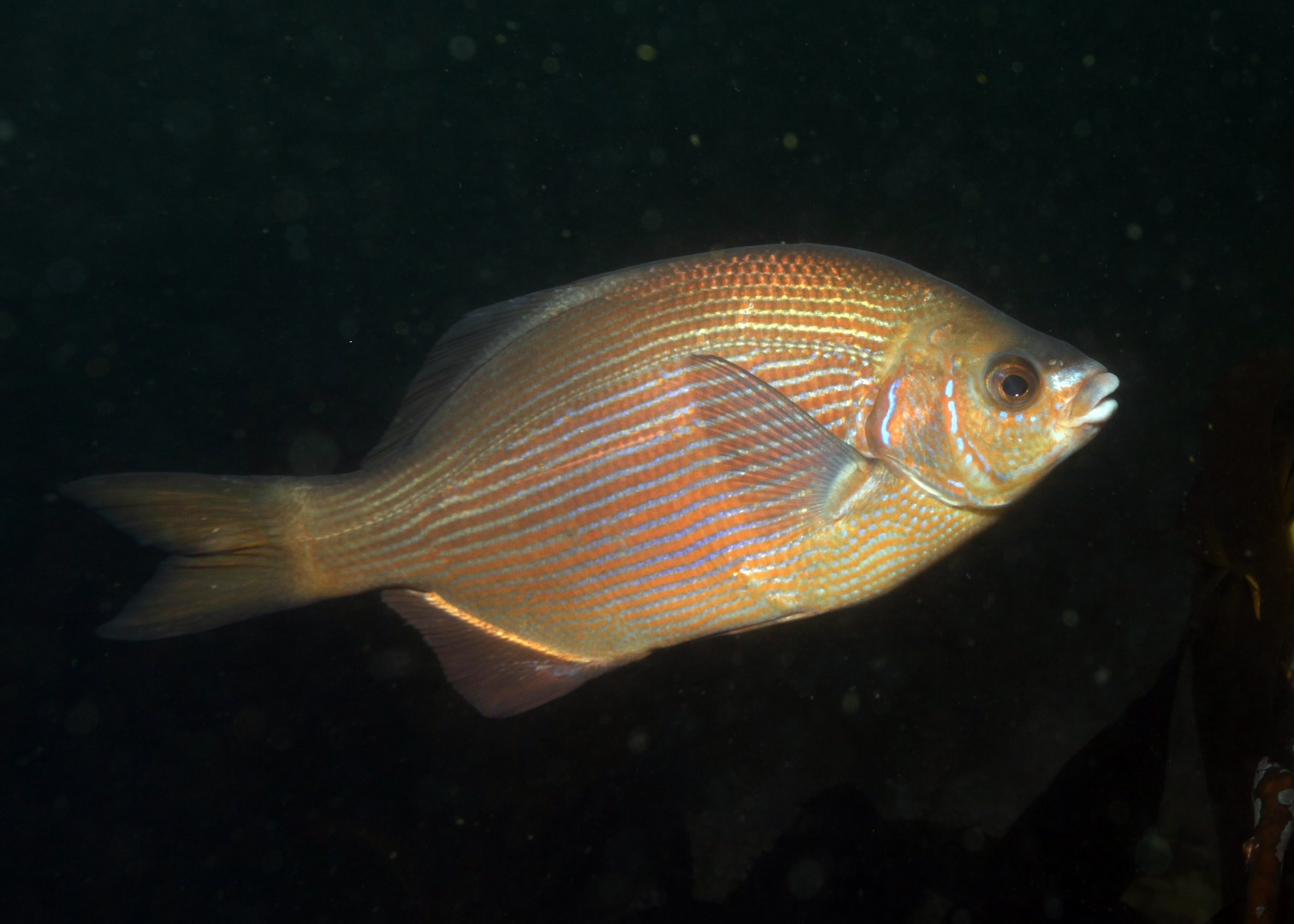
- Striped surfperch (Embiotoca lateralis)

Scientific classification
- Kingdom: Animalia
- Phylum: Chordata
- Class: Actinopterygii
- Order: Blenniiformes
- Family: Embiotocidae; Agassiz, 1853

Genera
- Amphistichus; Brachyistius; Cymatogaster; Ditrema; Embiotoca; Hyperprosopon; Hypocritichthys; Hypsurus; Hysterocarpus; Micrometrus; Neoditrema; Phanerodon; Rhacochilus; Zalembius; †Eriquius

= Surfperch =

Surfperch Temporal range: Late Miocene–present

Family of ray-finned fishes

The surfperches are a family of viviparous ray-finned fishes, the Embiotocidae. Most species are marine, inhabiting coastal waters from Baja California to Alaska, with a few found in Asian Pacific coasts. The only freshwater species, the tule perch (Hysterocarpus traski), is endemic to California, United States.

== Etymology ==
From Greek embios meaning 'persistent' and tokos meaning 'birth', alluding to the viviparous reproduction exhibited by embiotocids.

== Fossil record ==
Fossil embiotocids have been found in California, including Eriquius plectrodes from the Late Miocene and the much younger Damalichthys saratogensis.

== Description ==
Surfperches are characterized by deep, laterally compressed bodies and a scaled ridge along the base of the dorsal fin. In all species, males can be visibly distinguished from females by the presence of the distinct reproductive organ on the anal fin.

== Reproduction ==
Surfperches are viviparous, an uncommon trait among marine fishes. Eggs are internally fertilized, and females carry developing embryos for several months. Embryos develop inside the ovary, and are initially nourished by the yolk and surrounding ovarian fluid. Embryos have highly vascular dorsal and anal fins which lay against the vascular ovarian wall, absorbing nutrients and oxygen directly from the mother’s blood supply. Females give live birth to fully formed young instead of laying eggs.

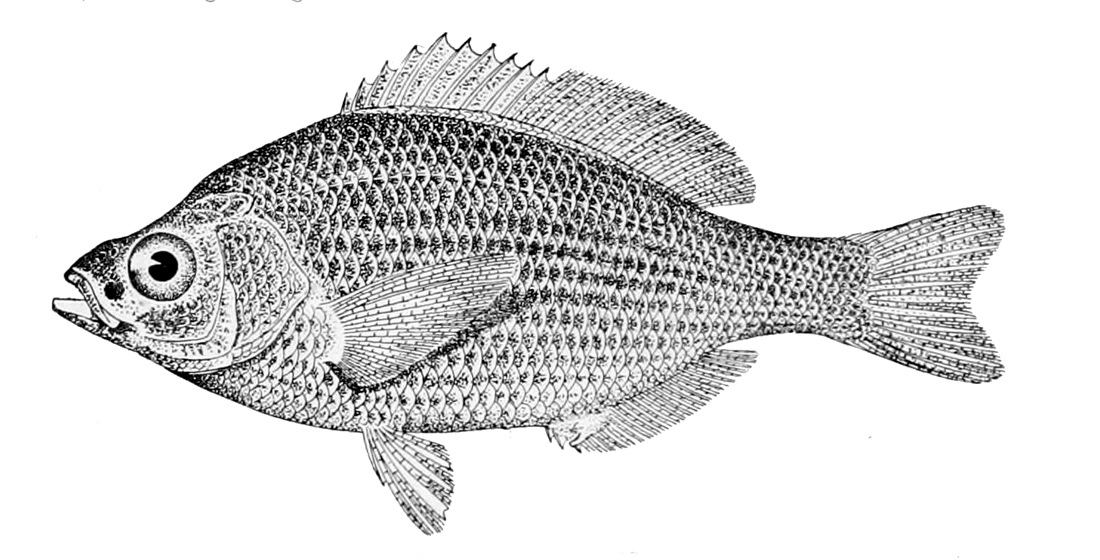
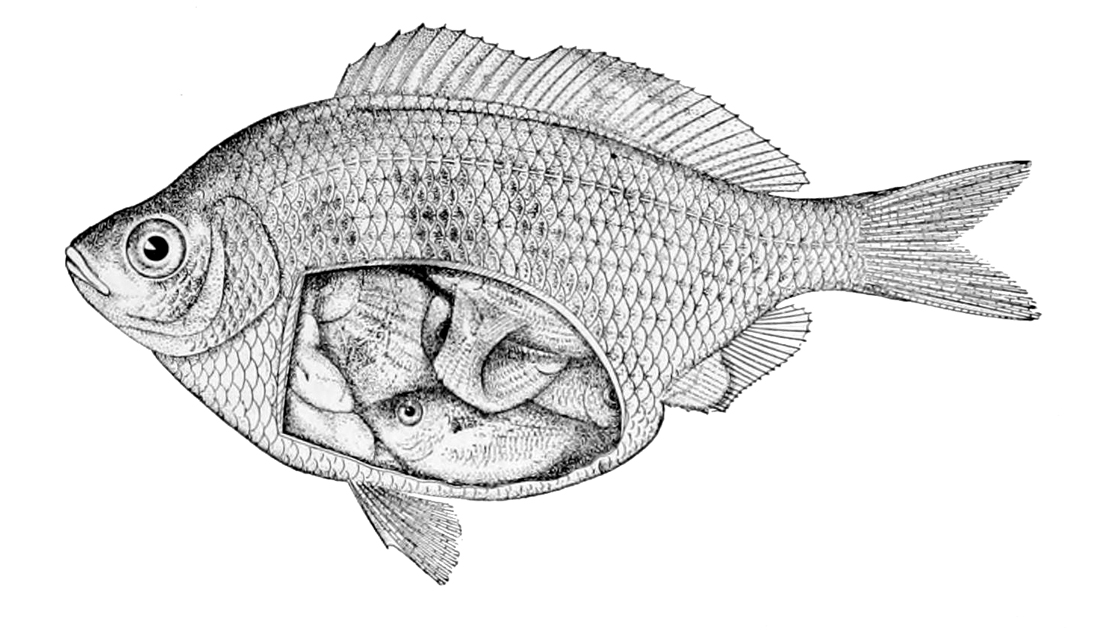
Shiner perch (Cymatogaster aggregata): Male in breeding colouration (left), and female pregnant with young (right)

== Biology ==
=== Feeding ===
Diet varies with species and location. For example, the pile surfperch (Rhacochilus vacca) specializes on hard-shelled mollusks and crustaceans, while the striped surfperch (Embiotoca lateralis) consumes mainly amphipods and bryozoans.

== See also ==
- List of fish families
