= List of mammals of Oregon =

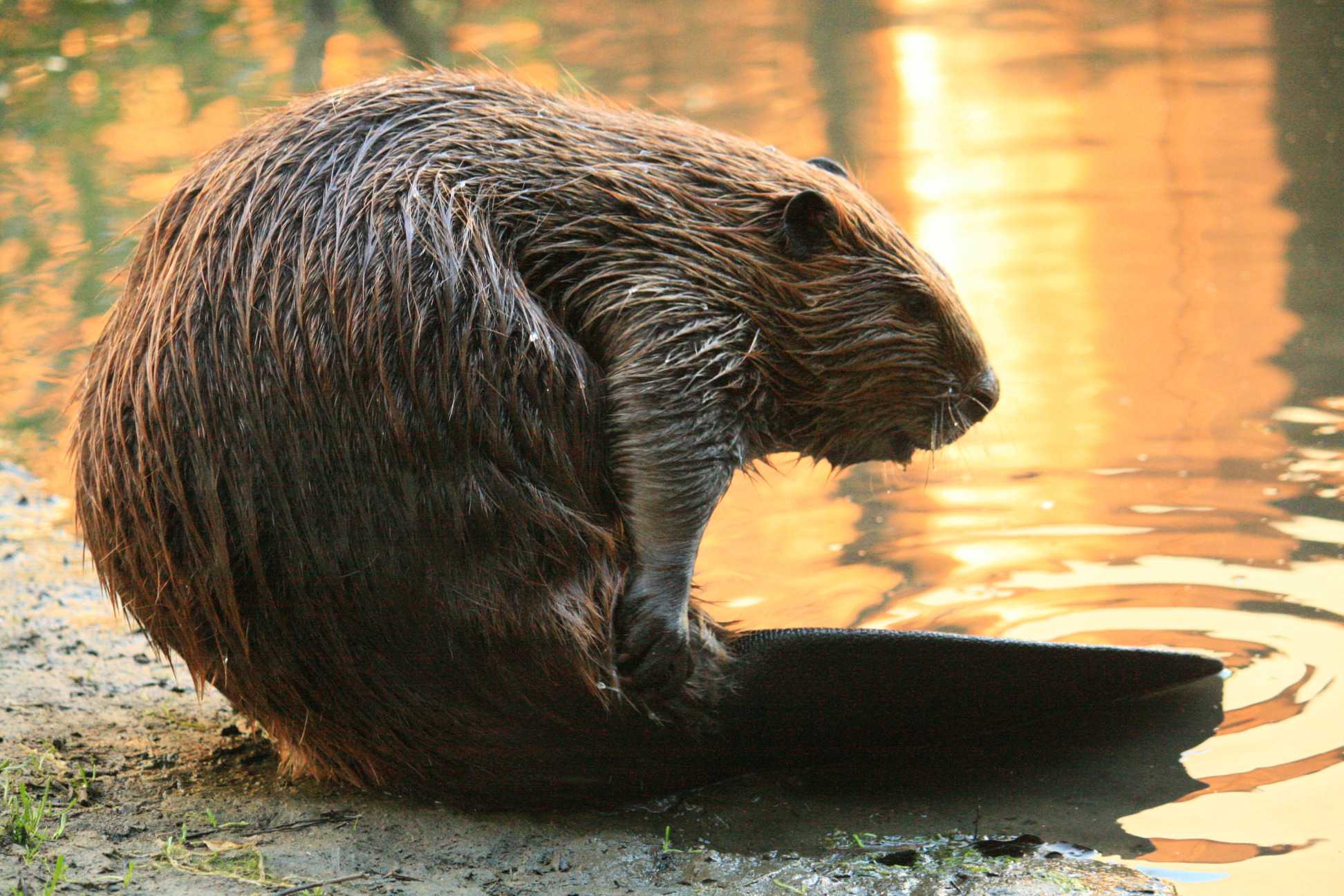
The North American beaver is the state mammal of Oregon.

This list of mammals of Oregon includes all wild mammal species living in or recently extirpated from the U.S. state of Oregon or its coastal shores. This list includes all species from the lists published by the American Society of Mammalogists or found in the comprehensive text Land Mammals of Oregon published in 1998. Rare instances where these lists disagree are noted. Species are grouped by order and then listed in sortable tables by family. Subspecies present in the region are discussed in the notes. The IUCN Red List status for each species is presented. Images presented are from Oregon or adjacent states, as possible. Species found only in captivity are not listed.

== Oregon mammals by order ==
Table has not been updated for threatened species, thus all are listed "n/a".

Order	Members	Species	Threatened species
Artiodactyla	Even-toed ungulates	7	n/a
Carnivora	Carnivorans	24	n/a
Cetacea	Whales, dolphins and porpoises	6	n/a
Chiroptera	Bats	15	n/a
Didelphimorphia	Common opossums	1	n/a
Lagomorpha	Hares, rabbits and pikas	8	n/a
Rodentia	Rodents	63	n/a
Soricomorpha	Shrews, moles and solenodons	15	n/a
Total		139	n/a

== Conservation statuses ==
Species are classified in nine groups, set through criteria such as rate of decline, population size, area of geographic distribution, degree of population and distribution fragmentation. The tables below reclassified results before 1994 to reflect the current rating system.

Low vulnerability

Least concern
Near threatened

Threatened

Vulnerable

Endangered

Critically endangered

Extinct

Extinct in the wild
Extinct

Insufficient data

Data deficient
Not evaluated

== Terrestrial mammals ==
=== Carnivora ===
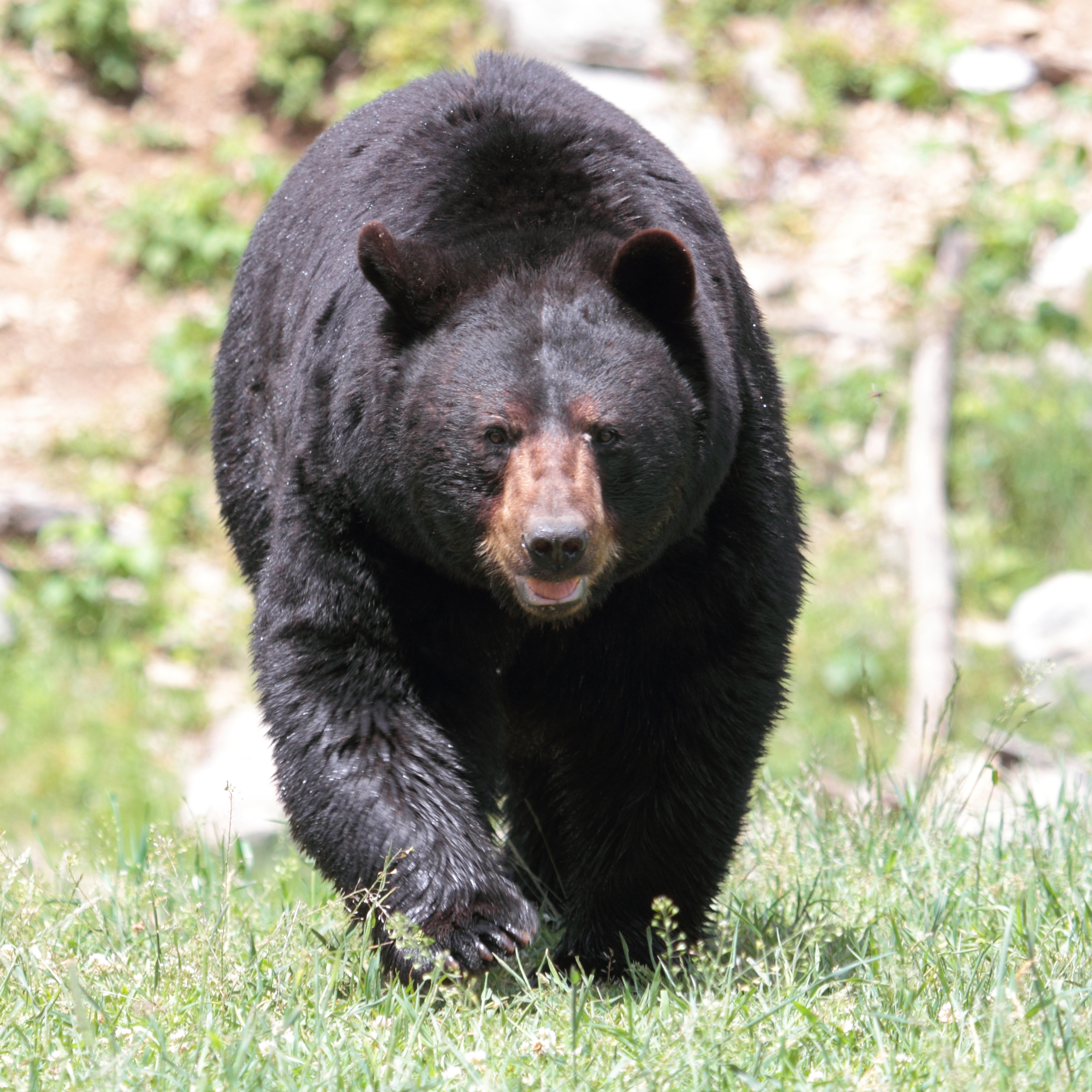
Between 25,000 and 30,000 black bears reside in Oregon.

Carnivora (/kɑːrˈnɪvərə/ or /ˌkɑːrnɪˈvɔːrə/; from Latin carō (stem carn-) "flesh", + vorāre "to devour") is one of the most diverse of the mammalian orders. The gray wolf has recolonized Oregon especially in the northeast and is included in the list below. The grizzly bear was extirpated from the state in approximately 1940. Since it is included in Land Mammals of Oregon, it is included in the list below.

Common name	Scientific name authority	Family	Distribution and notes	Red List
Coyote	Canis latrans (Say, 1823)	Canidae	Intermediate size between foxes and wolf; albinos have been documented in state; two of nineteen geographic races are known in the state.	
Gray wolf	Canis lupus (Linnaeus, 1758)	Canidae	Resettled in the state. Gray wolves in Oregon represent northwestern wolves (Canis lupus occidentalis) which migrated from neighboring Idaho; as of the end of 2013, there were a minimum 64 individuals with 4 breeding pairs. Protected under the state Endangered Species Act and under the federal ESA west of highways. The first confirmed wolf in the state since 1947 was OR-7 (pictured), also known as Journey.	
Gray fox	Urocyon cinereoargenteus (Schreber, 1775)	Canidae	Found throughout the state; grizzle gray coloring; tail has black stripe on dorsal aspect; nocturnal and crepuscular; tree climber for resting, foraging or escape from predators (unique among North American canids)	
Kit fox	Vulpes macrotis (Merriam, 1888)	Canidae	Southeast region of state; smallest canid in North America; brownish-gray dorsum, lightening through buff to white on abdomen; large ears; tip of tail is black.	
Red fox	Vulpes vulpes (Linnaeus, 1758)	Canidae	Found throughout state; red phase individuals are more predominant than silver or crossed; populations increased as wolf populations declined; subspecies Sierra Nevada red fox (Vulpes vulpes necator) observed on Mt Hood and Crater Lake in or after 2010.	
Black bear	Ursus americanus (Pallas, 1780)	Ursidae		
Grizzly bear	Ursus arctos (Linnaeus, 1758)	Ursidae	Extirpated; historically, they were broadly distributed throughout state except for arid eastern reaches. The last grizzly was killed in Oregon in 1931, according to some authorities.	
Wolverine	Gulo gulo	Mustelidae	Extirpated; occasional vagrants appear from neighboring states.	
Pacific marten	Martes caurina (Merriam, 1890)	Mustelidae		
American ermine	Mustela richardsonii	Mustelidae		
Long-tailed weasel	Neogale frenata	Mustelidae		
American mink	Neogale vison	Mustelidae		
Fisher	Pekania pennanti (Erxleben, 1777)	Mustelidae	Reintroduced; protected in Oregon.	
American badger	Taxidea taxus	Mustelidae	More common in sagebrush deserts in eastern Oregon.	
Sea otter	Enhydra lutris	Mustelidae	Extirpated; the last native sea otter in Oregon was killed in the early 20th century. In 1970 and 1971, 95 sea otters were reintroduced from Amchitka Island, Alaska, to the southern Oregon coast. However, the attempt failed and otters soon disappeared. Occasional sightings are most likely wanderers from neighboring states.	
North American river otter	Lontra canadensis	Mustelidae		
Striped skunk	Mephitis mephitis	Mephitidae		
Western spotted skunk	Spilogale gracilis	Mephitidae		
Northern fur seal	Callorhinus ursinus	Otariidae		
California sea lion	Zalophus californianus	Otariidae		
Steller sea lion	Eumetopias jubatus	Otariidae		
Harbor seal	Phoca vitulina	Phocidae		
Northern elephant seal	Mirounga angustirostris	Phocidae		
Ring-tailed cat	Bassariscus astutus	Procyonidae		
Raccoon	Procyon lotor	Procyonidae		
Canada lynx	Lynx canadensis	Felidae	Extirpated; historically ranged through the Willamette Valley, the Cascade range, Steens Mountain, the Stinkingwater Mountains, the Blue Mountains and the Wallowa Mountains. Under federal ESA protection since 2000 with critical habitat areas defined. Occasional sightings keep happening in Northeastern Oregon in high elevation areas	
Bobcat	Lynx rufus	Felidae		
Mountain lion	Puma concolor	Felidae		

=== Chiroptera ===
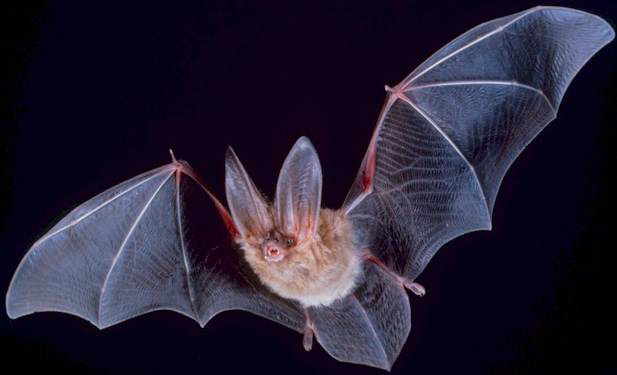
Bridges are constructed in Oregon with an eye towards protection of Townsend's big-eared bats and other wildlife species.

Common name	Scientific name authority	Family	Distribution and notes	Red List
Big brown bat	Eptesicus fuscus	Vespertilionidae		
Western pipistrelle or canyon bat	Pipistrellius hesperus	Vespertilionidae	Smallest bat in Oregon.	
Western red bat	Lasiurus blossevillii	Vespertilionidae		
Hoary bat	Lasiurus cinereus	Vespertilionidae		
Townsend's big-eared bat	Corynorhinus townsendii	Vespertilionidae		
Spotted bat	Euderma maculatum	Vespertilionidae		
Pallid bat	Antrozous pallidus	Vespertilionidae	Typically found in desert regions, semi-arid.	
Silver-haired bat	Lasionycteris noctivagans	Vespertilionidae		
Californian myotis	Myotis californicus	Vespertilionidae		
Western small-footed bat	Myotis ciliolabrum	Vespertilionidae		
Little brown myotis	Myotis lucifugus	Vespertilionidae		
Dark-nosed small-footed myotis	Myotis melanorhinus	Vespertilionidae		
Fringed myotis	Myotis thysanodes	Vespertilionidae		
Long-legged myotis	Myotis volans	Vespertilionidae		
Yuma myotis	Myotis yumanensis	Vespertilionidae		
Brazilian/Mexican free-tailed bat	Tadarida brasiliensis	Molossidae		

=== Rodentia ===
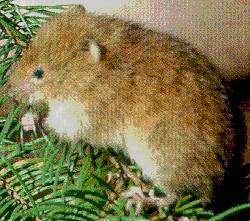
The North Oregon Coast population of red tree voles are candidates for protection under the Endangered Species Act.

The North Oregon Coast population of red tree voles (Arborimus longicaudus) are candidates for protection under the Endangered Species Act.

Common name	Scientific name authority	Family	Distribution and notes	Red List
Mountain beaver	Aplodontia rufa	Aplodontidae		
North American beaver	Castor canadensis	Castoridae		
Common porcupine	Erethizon dorsatum	Erethizontidae		
Nutria	Myocastor coypus	Myocastoridae	Introduced.	
Long-tailed vole	Microtus longicaudus	Cricetidae		
Montane vole	Microtus montanus	Cricetidae		
Creeping vole	Microtus oregoni	Cricetidae		
North American water vole	Microtus richardsoni	Cricetidae		
Townsend's vole	Microtus townsendii	Cricetidae		
Bushy-tailed woodrat	Neotoma cinerea	Cricetidae		
Dusky-footed woodrat	Neotoma fuscipes	Cricetidae		
Desert woodrat	Neotoma lepida	Cricetidae		
Common muskrat	Ondatra zibethicus	Cricetidae		
Northern grasshopper mouse	Onychomys leucogaster	Cricetidae		
White-footed vole	Arborimus albipes	Cricetidae		
Red tree vole	Arborimus longicaudus	Cricetidae		
Western red-backed vole	Clethrionomys californicus	Cricetidae		
Southern red-backed vole	Myodes gapperi	Cricetidae		
Sagebrush vole	Lemmiscus curtatus	Cricetidae		
California vole	Microtus californicus	Cricetidae		
Gray-tailed vole	Microtus canicaudus	Cricetidae		
Brush deermouse	Peromyscus boylii	Cricetidae		
Canyon deermouse	Peromyscus crinitus	Cricetidae		
Western deermouse	Peromyscus sonoriensis	Cricetidae		
Piñon deermouse	Peromyscus truei	Cricetidae		
Western heather vole	Phenacomys intermedius	Cricetidae		
Western harvest mouse	Reithrodontomys megalotis	Cricetidae		
Botta's pocket gopher	Thomomys bottae	Geomyidae		
Northern pocket gopher	Thomomys talpoides	Geomyidae		
Mazama pocket gopher	Thomomys mazama	Geomyidae		
Townsend's pocket gopher	Thomomys townsendii	Geomyidae		
Camas pocket gopher	Thomomys bulbivorus	Geomyidae		
California kangaroo rat	Dipodomys californicus	Heteromyidae		
Yellow-pine chipmunk	Tamias amoenus	Sciuridae		
Least chipmunk	Tamias minimus	Sciuridae		
North American red squirrel	Tamiasciurus hudsonicus	Sciuridae		
Belding's ground squirrel	Urocitellus beldingi	Sciuridae		
Merriam's ground squirrel	Urocitellus canus	Sciuridae		
Columbian ground squirrel	Urocitellus columbianus	Sciuridae		
Wyoming ground squirrel	Urocitellus elegans	Sciuridae		
Chisel-toothed kangaroo rat	Dipodomys microps	Heteromyidae		
Ord's kangaroo rat	Dipodomys ordii	Heteromyidae		
Dark kangaroo mouse	Microdipodops megacephalus	Heteromyidae		
Little pocket mouse	Perognathus longimembris	Heteromyidae		
Great Basin pocket mouse	Perognathus parvus	Heteromyidae		
House mouse	Mus musculus	Muridae	Not native	
Brown rat	Rattus norvegicus	Muridae	Not native	
Black rat	Rattus rattus	Muridae	Not native	
Golden-mantled ground squirrel	Callospermophilus lateralis	Sciuridae		
Douglas squirrel	Tamiasciurus douglasii	Sciuridae		
Northern flying squirrel	Glaucomys sabrinus	Sciuridae		
Humboldt's flying squirrel	Glaucomys oregonensis	Sciuridae		
Yellow-bellied marmot	Marmota flaviventris	Sciuridae		

=== Artiodactyla ===
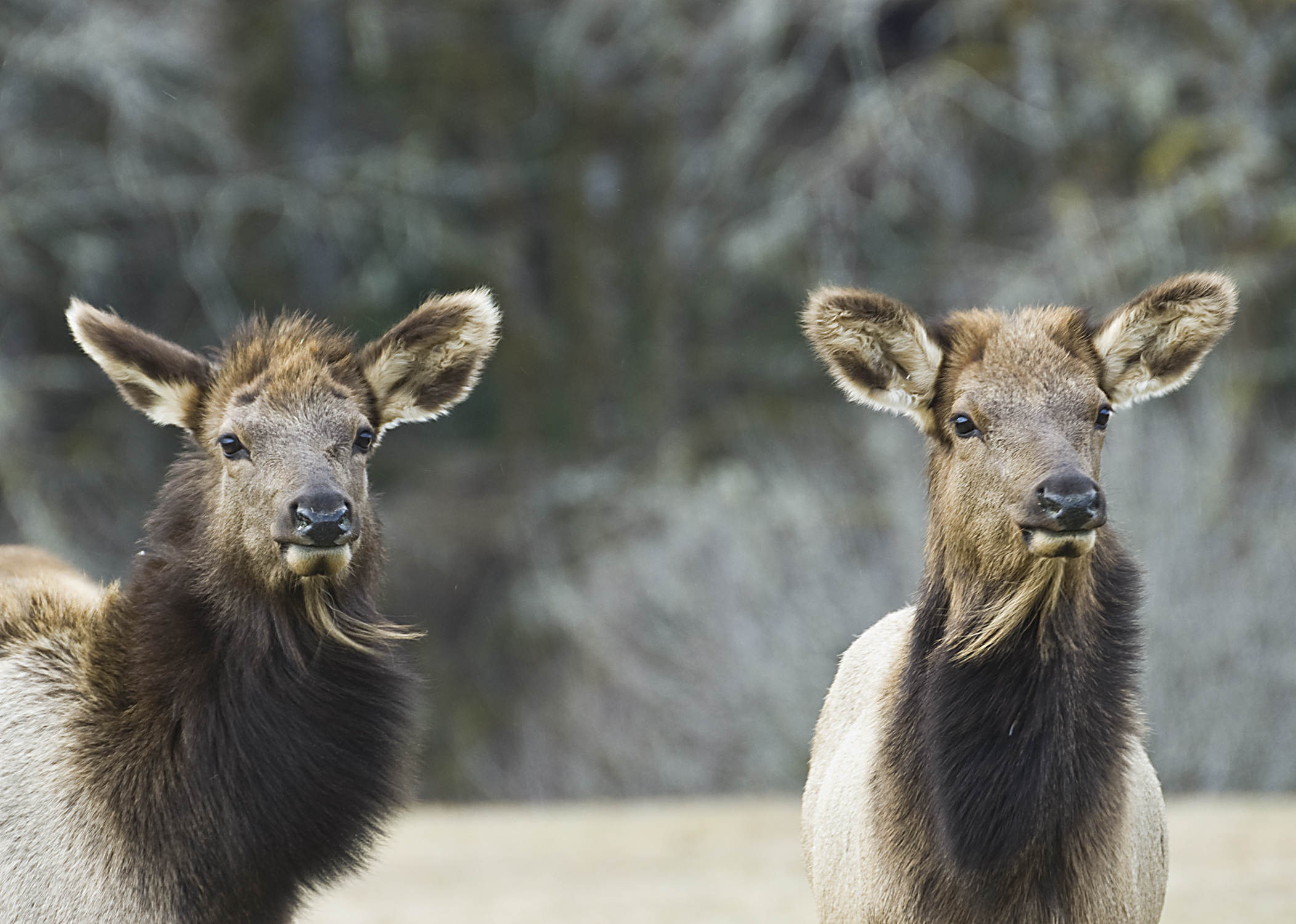
Elk calves at the Jewell Meadows Wildlife Area

Common name	Scientific name authority	Family	Distribution and notes	Red List
Pronghorn	Antilocapra americana	Antilocapridae	The Oregon pronghorn subspecies (A. a. oregona Bailey) has been described, but taxonomic status may be in question. Found in sagebrush steppe in eastern regions of state. Fastest mammal on the continent: top speeds of 50 mph (80 km/h) (Image taken in Catlow Valley, Oregon)	
American bison	Bison bison	Bovidae	Historically native to eastern and central Oregon. Extirpated by the early to mid-19th century. Feral herd living in Wallowa	
Bighorn sheep	Ovis canadensis	Bovidae	Historically native to much of eastern Oregon, but then became extinct in the state until reintroductions, recently to the Mutton Mountains, Cottonwood Canyon State Park and near the John Day Fossil Beds in the 21st century; bighorn sheep now live in herds scattered across eastern Oregon.	
Mountain goat	Oreamnos americanus	Bovidae	Historically native to the northern Oregon Cascades and the Wallowa and Blue mountains until extinction in the state in the 19th or 20th century; reintroduced to the Wallowa and Elkhorn mountains starting in the 20th century, and recently introduced to Mount Jefferson in 2010 and 2012.	
Elk	Cervus canadensis	Cervidae	Common throughout state	
Mule deer	Odocoileus hemionus	Cervidae	Common throughout	
White-tailed deer	Odocoileus virginianus	Cervidae	Common throughout	
Moose	Alces alces	Cervidae	Northeastern reaches, Wallowa County, small population of the subspecies Shiras moose (A. a. shirasi); largest extant species in deer family; herbivorous.	

=== Eulipotyphla ===
Common name	Scientific name authority	Family	Distribution and notes	Red List
Baird's shrew	Sorex bairdii	Soricidae	Endemic to northwestern Oregon; two subspecies described, see main article page; dwells among conifers.	
Marsh shrew	Sorex bendirii	Soricidae		
Masked shrew	Sorex cinereus	Soricidae	Disputed. On ASM list but not in Verts.	
Merriam's shrew	Sorex merriami	Soricidae		
Dusky shrew	Sorex monticolus	Soricidae		
Pacific shrew	Sorex pacificus	Soricidae		
American water shrew	Sorex palustris	Soricidae		
Preble's shrew	Sorex preblei	Soricidae		
Fog shrew	Sorex sonomae	Soricidae		
Trowbridge's shrew	Sorex trowbridgii	Soricidae		
Vagrant shrew	Sorex vagrans	Soricidae		
Shrew mole	Neurotrichus gibbsii	Talpidae		
Broad-footed mole	Scapanus latimanus	Talpidae		
Coast mole	Scapanus orarius	Talpidae		
Townsend's mole	Scapanus townsendii	Talpidae		

=== Lagomorpha ===
The order Lagomorpha consists of two living families: the Leporidae (hares and rabbits) and the Ochotonidae (pikas). The name of the order is derived from the Greek lagos (λαγός, "hare") and morphē (μορφή, "form"). There are eight species in Oregon.

Common name	Scientific name authority	Family	Distribution and notes	Red List
American pika	Ochotona princeps (Richardson, 1828)	Ochotonidae	Columbia River Gorge, western Cascades; common herbivore; lives in rocky areas/talus habitat near vegetation, meadows; lava flows, woodcuts, disturbed habitat.	
Pygmy rabbit	Brachylagus idahoensis (Merriam, 1891)	Leporidae	Southern Oregon, endangered in Washington; resides among dense sagebrush; rarely daytime; mostly active dawn/dusk (crepuscular); burrow dwellings; walks/scurries.	
Snowshoe hare	Lepus americanus	Leporidae	Northern coast, south-central, and eastern reaches; shelters daytime; vegetation/groundcover; active crepuscular and at night; marshes, forests, dense vegetation habitats. Lepus americanus oregonus subspecies described (Orr)	
Black-tailed jackrabbit	Lepus californicus	Leporidae	Southwestern Oregon; agricultural fields, grazing areas/pastures, sagebrush, prairies, deserts; rests in shady ground depressions daytime; active night/crepuscular; lighter markings in summer.	
White-tailed jackrabbit	Lepus townsendii	Leporidae	Eastern/central; fields, grasslands, meadows; sometimes sagebrush flats; primary activity nights; characteristic zigzag pattern with rapid bursts and leaps when pursued.	
Eastern cottontail	Sylvilagus floridanus	Leporidae	Eastern slopes of the Willamette Valley and the Cascades; near forests, agricultural sites, prairies, wet lowlands, margins of hardwood forests; most common of genus in state; sleeps days, under vegetation; crepuscular to nocturnal.	
Mountain cottontail	Sylvilagus nuttallii	Leporidae	East of the Cascades; near rivers/streams, rockier areas; found near spruce and ponderosa pine forests, some sagebrush flats; crepuscular; may climbs trees; eats cheatgrass.	
Brush rabbit	Sylvilagus bachmani	Leporidae	Verts, page 131	

=== Didelphimorphia ===
There is only one species from the order Didelphimorphia in the state.

Common name	Scientific name authority	Family	Distribution and notes	Red List
Virginia opossum	Didelphis virginiana (Kerr, 1792)	Didelphidae	Introduced early 1900s; adverse impacts on native bird populations from nest disturbances and egg consumption.	

== Marine mammals ==
=== Cetacea ===
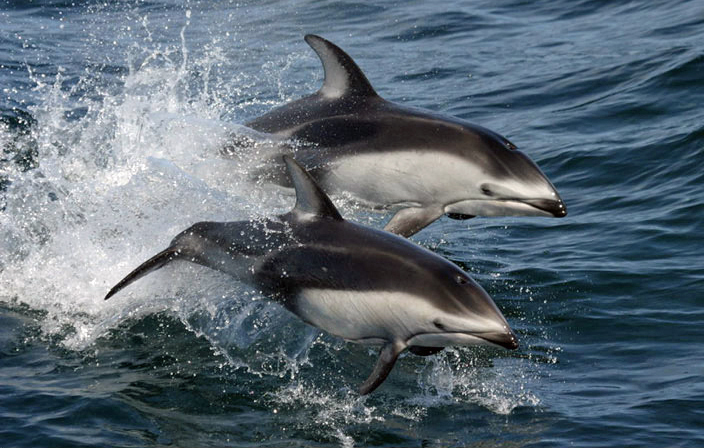
Pacific white-sided dolphins are found along the Oregon Coast.

Common name	Scientific name authority	Family	Distribution and notes	Red List
Common minke whale	Balaenoptera acutorostrata	Balaenopteridae		
Sei whale	Balaenoptera borealis	Balaenopteridae		
Blue whale	Balaenoptera musculus	Balaenopteridae		
Fin whale	Balaenoptera physalus	Balaenopteridae		
Humpback whale	Megaptera novaeangliae	Balaenopteridae		
Gray whale	Eschrichtius robustus	Eschrichtiidae		
Short-beaked common dolphin	Delphinus delphis	Delphinidae		
Short-finned pilot whale	Globicephala macrorhynchus	Delphinidae		
Risso's dolphin	Grampus griseus	Delphinidae		
Pacific white-sided dolphin	Lagernorhynchus obliquidens	Delphinidae		
Northern right whale dolphin	Lissodelphis borealis	Delphinidae		
Killer whale	Orcinus orca	Delphinidae		
False killer whale	Pseudorca crassidens	Delphinidae		
Striped dolphin	Stenella coeruleoalba	Delphinidae		
Harbor porpoise	Phocoena phocoena	Phocoenidae		
Dall's porpoise	Phocoenoides dalli	Phocoenidae		
Sperm whale	Physeter macrocephalus	Physeteridae		
Pygmy sperm whale	Kogia breviceps	Kogiidae		
Dwarf sperm whale	Kogia sima	Kogiidae		
Baird's beaked whale	Berardius bairdii	Ziphiidae		
Hubbs' beaked whale	Mesoplodon carlhubbsi	Ziphiidae		
Stejneger's beaked whale	Mesoplodon stejnegeri	Ziphiidae		
Cuvier's beaked whale	Ziphius cavirostris	Ziphiidae		

== See also ==
- Fauna of Oregon
- List of prehistoric mammals
- Lists of mammals by region
- Mammal classification
- List of mammals described in the 2000s

== Bibliography ==
- Verts, B. J.; Carraway, Leslie N. (1998). Land Mammals of Oregon. University of California Press. ISBN 978-0-520-21199-5.
- Maser, Chris (1998). Mammals of the Pacific Northwest: From the Coast to the High Cascades. Oregon State University Press. ISBN 978-0-87071-438-2.
