= Fauna of Oregon =

Animals present in the State of Oregon

The fauna of the state of Oregon includes a wide array of species.

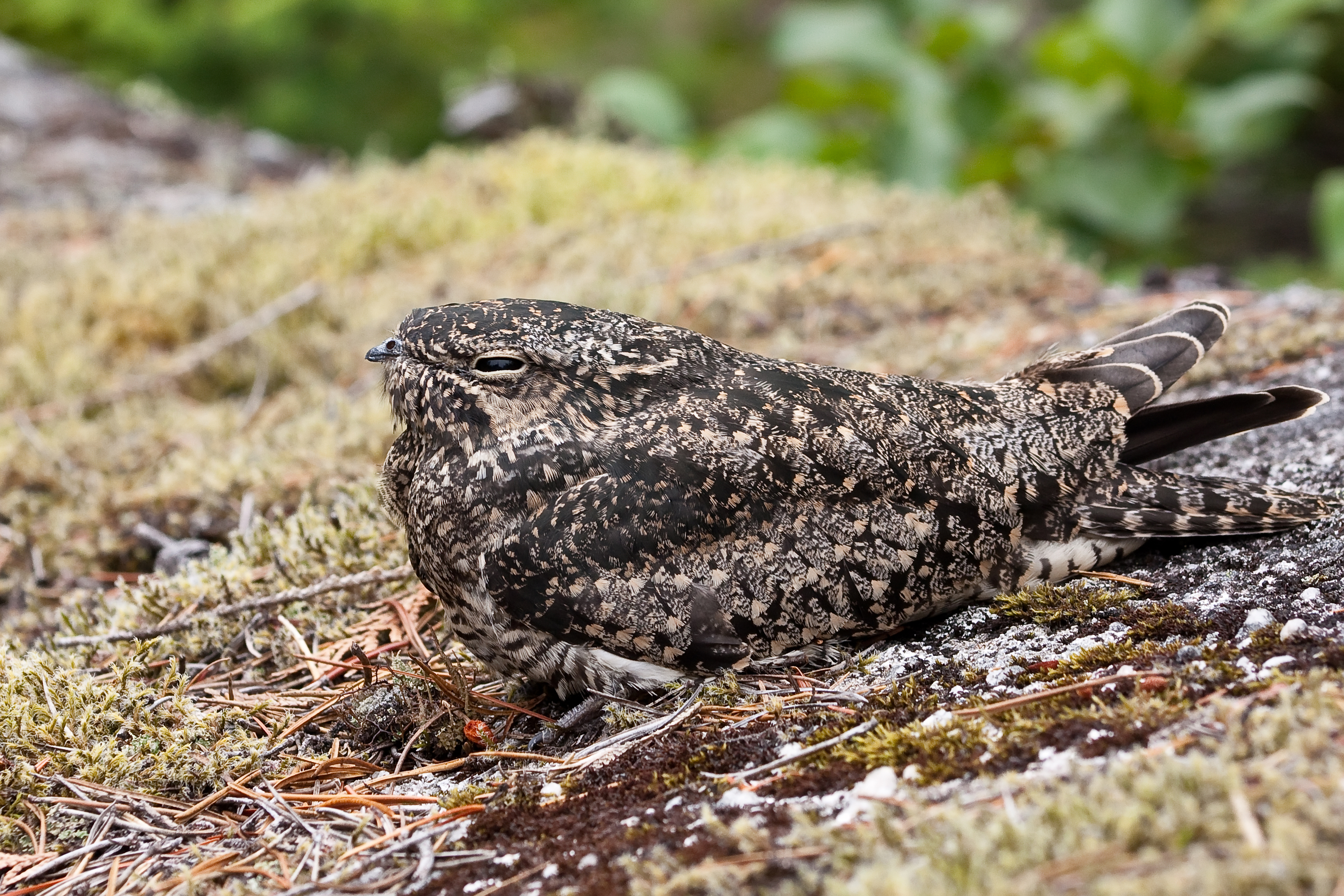
The common nighthawk is one of more than 50 species of birds seen in the John Day Fossil Beds National Monument.

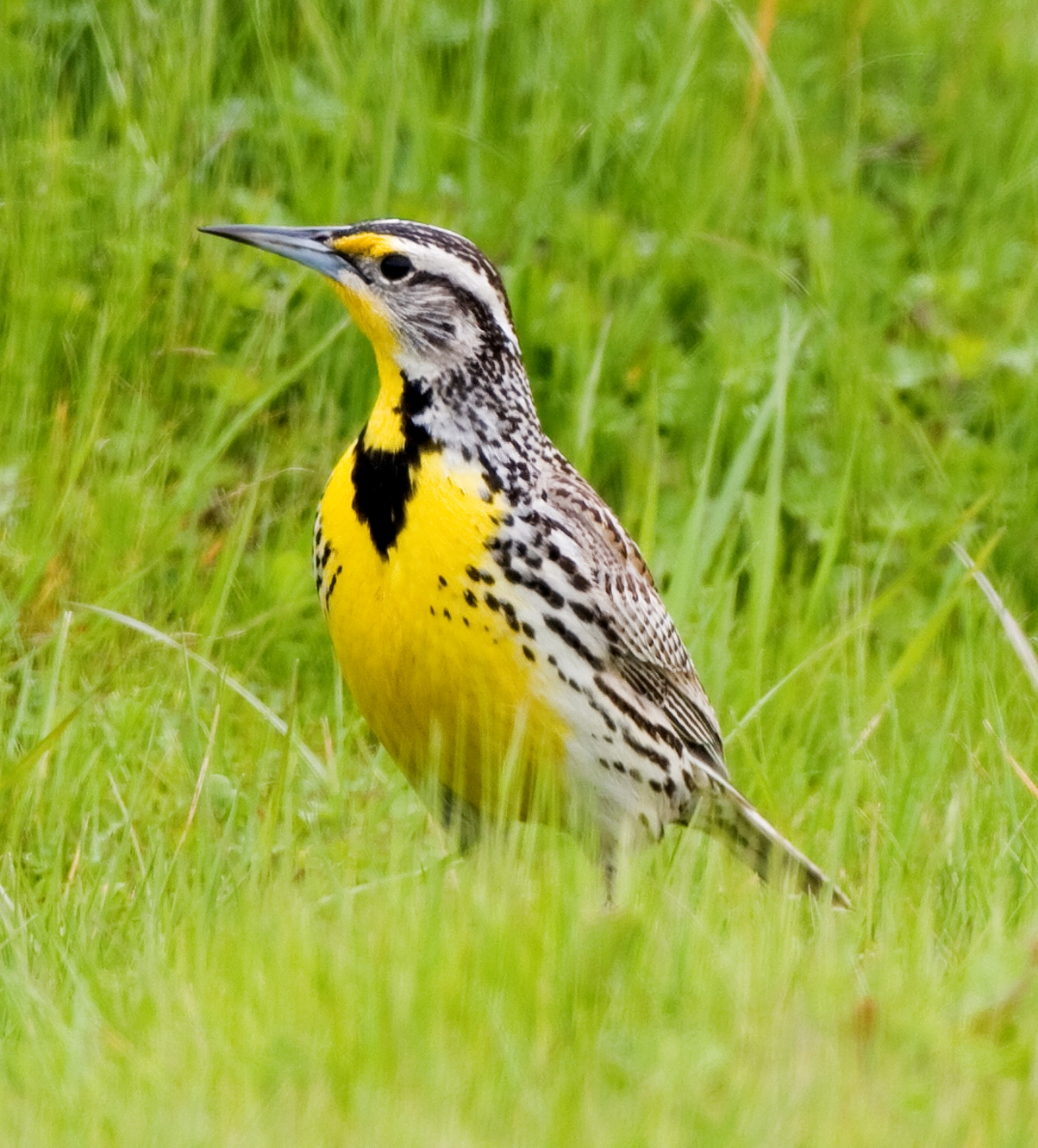
The western meadowlark is Oregon's state bird.

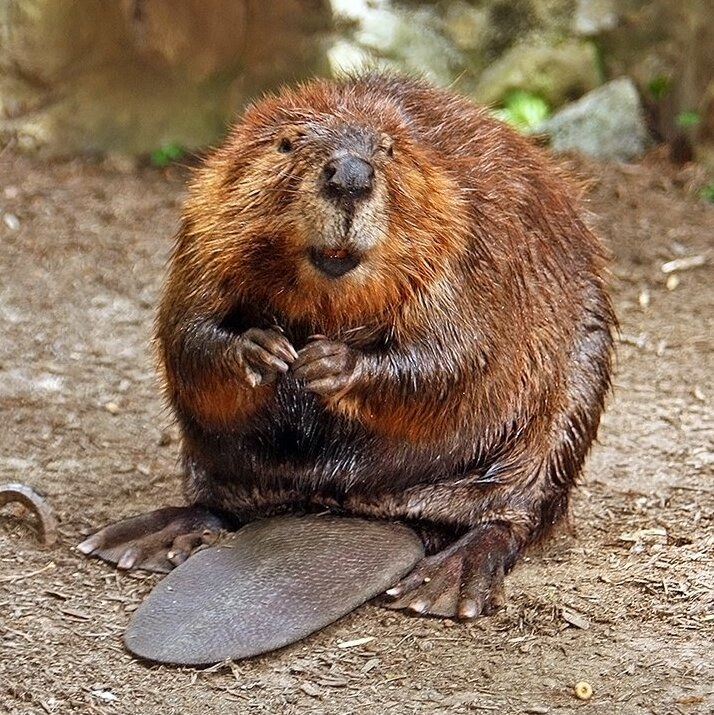
The North American beaver is Oregon's state mammal.

One way of presenting the fauna of Oregon is classification by lifezone. Oregon is a vastly diverse state in terms of topography and climate. Five of the seven recognized lifezones are identified in Oregon.

== Mammals ==
Although there are variable reports, some sources report that there are four species of mammals found exclusively in Oregon: the Baird's shrew, the Pacific shrew, the camas pocket gopher, and the red tree vole (North Oregon Coast "distinct population segment"). However, other sources list the red tree vole as present in northern California. According to the Oregon State University libraries Oregon Wildlife Explorer website, one hundred thirty-six mammals have been described, exclusive of marine mammals. Most of these are smaller creatures weighing under one kilogram, active primarily at night, with a tendency towards more inconspicuous ways of life. Some of the larger, more iconic, carnivorous species have been driven from the region. Others are present, but in lesser numbers.

The American Society of Mammalogists provides a more exhaustive listing of species. Grizzly bears are no longer listed. In 2011, it reported that 12 Canada lynx remain.

=== Elk ===
Elk were heavily hunted in Oregon in the 1800s leading to their extirpation from all but the most inaccessible parts of the Blue Mountains. Legal hunting officially ended in 1909. In 1912 fifteen elk were imported from Wyoming to re-establish huntable herds. The first elk hunting season post re-establishment was in 1933.

=== Gray wolf ===
The gray wolf was extirpated from Oregon in 1947 and returned in 1999 when wolves from Idaho began to move into the state. The gray wolf populations has been increasing in recent years and is monitored by the Oregon Department of Fish and Wildlife. The first confirmed wolf sighting in western Oregon since 1947, known as Journey or OR-7, was born in April, 2009 and OR-7 became the first wolf in modern times to move to California.

== See also ==
- List of fauna of Oregon
- List of mammals of Oregon
- List of birds of Oregon
- List of butterflies of Oregon
- List of amphibians and reptiles of Oregon
- John Day Fossil Beds National Monument § Fauna
- List of ecoregions in Oregon
