= List of fauna of Oregon =

This is a list of species of fauna (animals) that have been observed in the U.S. state of Oregon.

== Amphibians ==
=== Caudata ===
- Oregon slender salamander

== Reptiles ==
=== Serpentes ===
- California mountain kingsnake - Native to Oregon
- Common garter snake - Native to Oregon.
- Gopher snake - Native to Oregon
- Ground snake - Owyhee River
- Night snake - Native to Oregon
- Northwestern garter snake - Native to Oregon
- Pacific rattlesnake- Native to Oregon
- Racer - Native to Oregon
- Ringneck snake - Native to Oregon
- Rubber boa - Native to Oregon
- Sharptail snake - Native to Oregon
- Striped whipsnake - Native to Oregon
- Western rattlesnake - Found in Eastern Oregon
- Western terrestrial garter snake - Native to Oregon

=== Testudines ===
- Snapping turtle - Introduced into Oregon.
- Western painted turtle - Native to Oregon.

== Annelids ==
=== Haplotaxida ===
- Oregon giant earthworm

== Birds ==
- List of birds of Oregon

== Crustaceans ==
=== Notostraca ===
- Branchinecta lynchi - Also in California.
- Lepidurus packardi - Mostly Californian, but found in Jackson County, Oregon as well.

== Fish ==
=== Cypriniformes ===
- Warner sucker - Also in California, Arizona, and Nevada.
- Shortnose sucker - Also in California.
- Lost River sucker - Also in California.
- Modoc sucker - Also in California.

=== Acipenseriformes ===
- Green sturgeon - Rogue River in Oregon.
- White sturgeon - Umpqua River in Oregon.

=== Lamniformes ===
- Common thresher - Oregon coast.
- Great white shark - Oregon coast.
- Basking shark - Oregon coast.

=== Rajiformes ===
- Broad skate - Oregon coast.
- Fine-spined skate - Oregon coast.
- Pacific white skate - Oregon coast.
- Roughtail skate - Oregon coast.
- Deepsea skate - Oregon coast.
- Sandpaper skate - Oregon coast.

=== Perciformes ===
- Calico surfperch - Oregon coast.

=== Carcharhiniformes ===
- Brown catshark - Oregon coast.

=== Scorpaeniformes ===
- Mosshead sculpin - Oregon coast.
- Pit sculpin - Goose lake, Drews creek, and Thomas Creeks.
- Prickly sculpin - River drainages

=== Petromyzontidae ===
- Pacific lamprey - Native to Oregon
- Lampetra ayresii - Native to Oregon
- Western brook lamprey - Native to Oregon

== Insects ==
=== Odonata ===
- Canada darner - Native to Oregon and common across America.
- Paddle-tailed darner - Native to Oregon and common across America.
- Shadow darner - Native to Oregon and common across America.
- Common green darner - Native to Oregon and common across America.
- Sooty dancer - Native to Oregon.
- Paiute dancer - Native to Oregon.
- River jewelwing - Native to Oregon and common across America.
- Taiga bluet - Native to Oregon and common across America.

=== Orthoptera ===
- Jerusalem cricket - Found in Central and Eastern Oregon in the desert regions.

=== Hymenoptera ===
- Franklin's bumble bee - Found in Southern Oregon.

== Mammals ==
=== Rodentia ===
- Baird's shrew - Endemic to northwest Oregon.
- Camas pocket gopher - occurs only in the Willamette Valley, endemic to northwest Oregon in the Northwestern United States.
- Fog shrew - Also can be found in northern California.
- Gray-tailed vole - Endemic to Oregon.
- Pacific shrew - Endemic to western Oregon.
- White-tailed antelope squirrel - Found in central, eastern, and south-eastern Oregon, the desert regions.
- Mountain beaver - Found in Western Oregon.
- California kangaroo rat - Found in the Sierra Nevada Mountains in Oregon.
- Chisel-toothed kangaroo rat - Found in South Eastern Oregon.
- Ord's kangaroo rat - Found in Eastern Central Oregon.

=== Chiroptera ===
- Pallid bat - Native to Oregon and common in the western United States.

=== Cetartiodactyla ===
- American bison - Regionally extinct.

=== Lagomorpha ===
- Pygmy rabbit - North Eastern Oregon.
