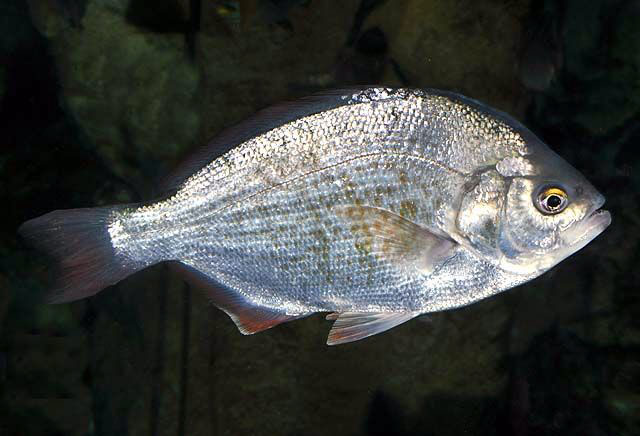
- Amphistichus rhodoterus

Scientific classification
- Kingdom: Animalia
- Phylum: Chordata
- Class: Actinopterygii
- Division: Teleostei
- Clade: Ovalentaria
- Order: Blenniiformes
- Family: Embiotocidae
- Genus: Amphistichus; Agassiz, 1854

Type species
- Amphistichus argenteus Agassiz, 1854

= Amphistichus =

Genus of fishes

Amphistichus is a genus of surfperches native to the eastern Pacific Ocean. This genus's species are commonly found in the surf zone and are very popular with west coast surf anglers.

== Species ==
There are currently three recognized species in this genus:

Species	Common name	Image
Amphistichus argenteus (Agassiz, 1854)	Barred surfperch	
Amphistichus koelzi (C. L. Hubbs, 1933)	Calico surfperch	
Amphistichus rhodoterus (Agassiz, 1854)	Redtail surfperch	
