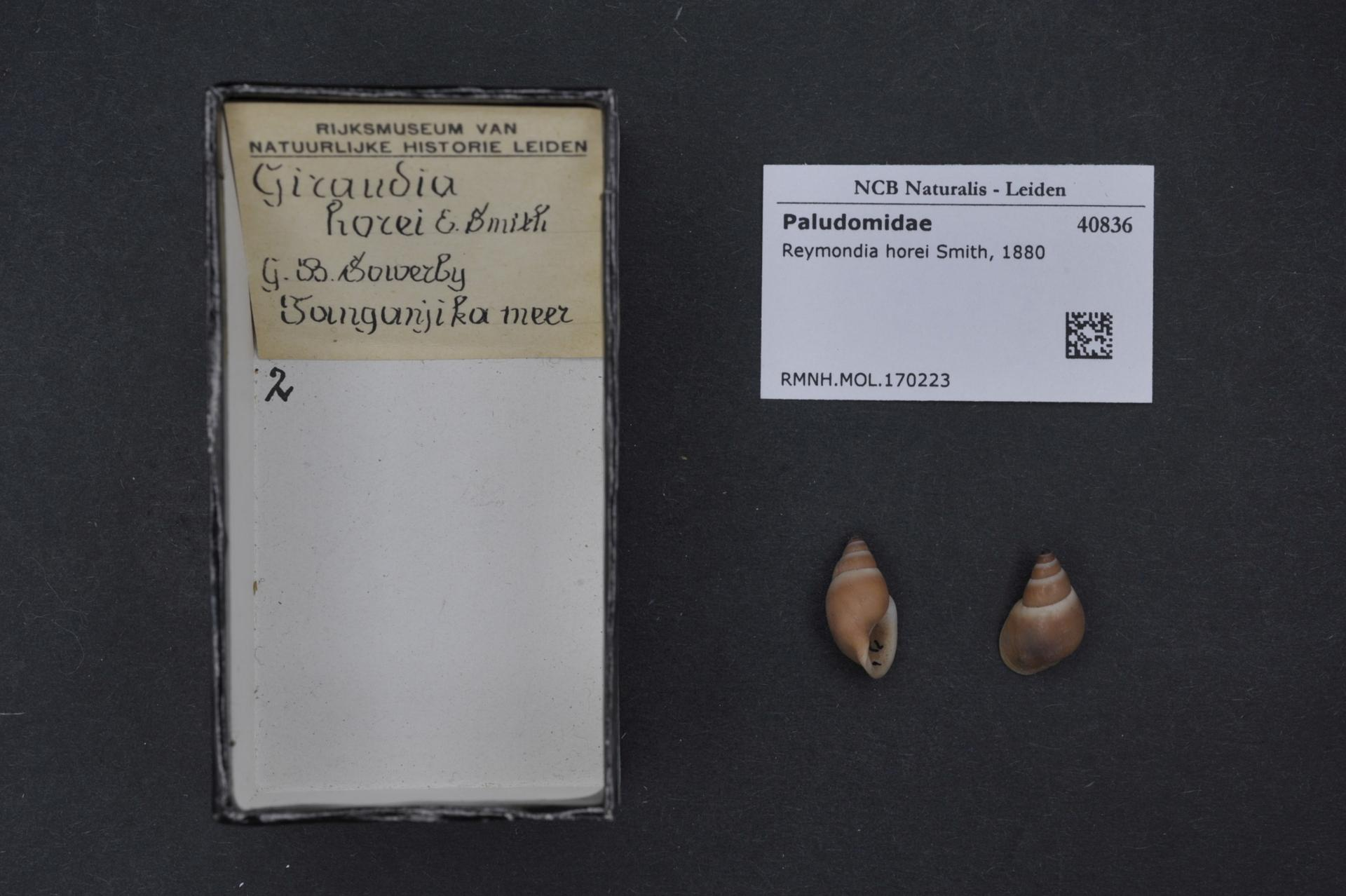
- Reymondia horei shell

Conservation status
- Least Concern (IUCN 3.1)

Scientific classification
- Kingdom: Animalia
- Phylum: Mollusca
- Class: Gastropoda
- Subclass: Caenogastropoda
- Family: Paludomidae
- Genus: Reymondia
- Species: R. horei

Binomial name
- Reymondia horei (Smith, 1880)

Synonyms
- Melania horei Smith, 1880; Tiphobia horei Smith, 1889; Giraudia horei Smith, 1906

= Reymondia horei =

Species of gastropod

Reymondia horei is a species of freshwater snail with an operculum, an aquatic gastropod mollusk in the family Paludomidae. This species is found in Burundi, the Democratic Republic of the Congo, Tanzania, and Zambia. Its natural habitat is freshwater lakes.

This species co-occurs with, and is sometimes confused with Reymondia pyramidalis. It is, however, a separate species.

== Description ==
The shells of R. horei are composed of six reddish-brown whorls, which are smoothly curved. There is a white band on all whorls. The overall height of the shell ranges from 13 to 16 millimetres (0.51 to 0.63 in), and diameter from 5.9 to 9 millimetres (0.23 to 0.35 in). The visible soft parts of the animal are colored grey or olive green, with a brown foot and white sole.

== Habitat ==
This is a freshwater-adapted species, endemic to Lake Tanganyika. It occurs in depths from 80 to 100 centimetres (31 to 39 in), frequently under rocks. It is most frequently found in the surf zone. It is generally only found on the top side of rocks, but also can be found on sand when there is minimal wave action. The species does appear to segregate by size.

The species is widespread and common, although the most significant threat to its survival is sedimentation of habitat.
