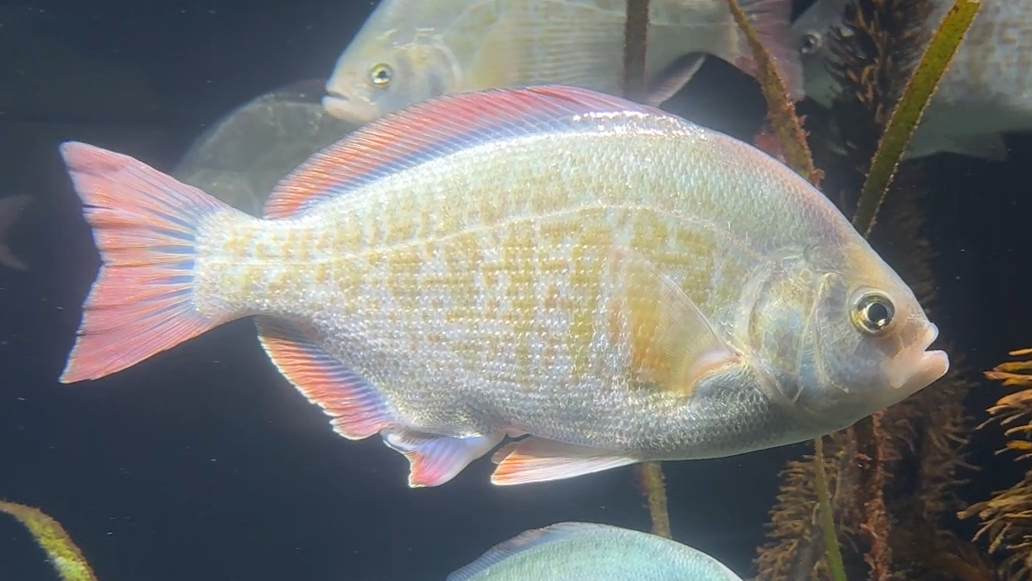
- Male, at the Vancouver Aquarium

Scientific classification
- Kingdom: Animalia
- Phylum: Chordata
- Class: Actinopterygii
- Order: Blenniiformes
- Family: Embiotocidae
- Genus: Amphistichus
- Species: A. rhodoterus

Binomial name
- Amphistichus rhodoterus (Agassiz, 1854)

Synonyms
- Holconotus rhodoterus Agassiz, 1854; Cymatogaster larkinsii Gibbons, 1854; Cymatogaster pulchellus Gibbons, 1854; Amphistichus heermanni Girard, 1854

= Redtail surfperch =

Species of fish

The redtail surfperch (Amphistichus rhodoterus) is a species of surfperch (Embiotocidae) that inhabits the near-shore and estuarine waters of North American Pacific coasts.

Redtail surfperch are one of three species in the genus Amphistichus (i.e. redtail, barred and calico surfperch), and one of six species in the subfamily (i.e. genera Amphistichus and Hyperprosopon).

== Range and habitat ==
Redtail surfperch are common along sandy ocean beaches and jetties year-round; these fish are found up-bay in estuaries seasonally, commonly during spring. Redtail surfperch are distributed from Avila Beach, California to Hope Island, B.C., and are the only New World marine surfperch that does not inhabit Southern and Baja California waters.

== Description ==
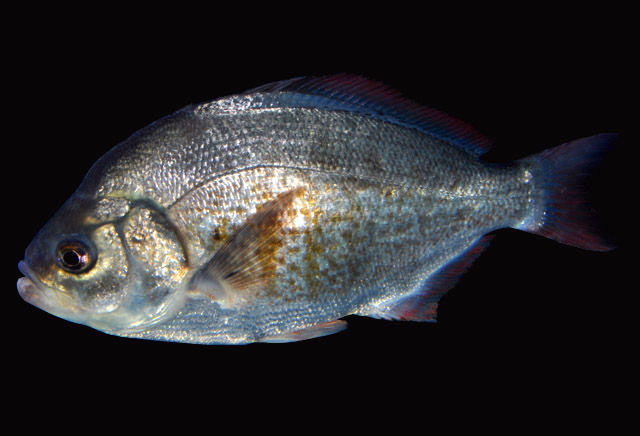
Female redtail surfperch

Redtail surfperch are a deep bodied fish, (i.e. oval in sideview), that are compressed (i.e. slender) from side to side, most often observed in the 8 to 11 inch lengths. The body is light colored, white to silver, with vertical marks or bars and red or pink fins (e. g. dorsal, anal and tail). The vertical marks begin as bars when young and become less distinct olive-red-brown markings as the fish grows. Fins of the redtail surfperch have both spines and fin rays, and the tail is moderately forked. The longest dorsal spines of the redtail surfperch are longer than dorsal fin rays, which helps distinguish the redtail surfperch from the barred surfperch (Amphistichus argenteus) and calico surfperch (Amphistichus koelzi.)

The redtail surfperch body is about twice as long as it is high, not including the mildly forked tail. The tail is about ¼ of the fish's length and is as wide as it is long. The first quarter of the redtail surfperch's length includes a small upturned mouth, eye, and gill cover. The second quarter of the fish includes an upward sloping back, the dorsal fin spines along the highest part of the back, a pectoral fin at the leading edge of the lowest part on the belly, and a moderately sized pectoral fin two-thirds of the way down the body just behind the gill cover. The third quarter of a redtail surfperch body contains the dorsal fin rays, the anus, and the start of the anal fin. The belly of the redtail surfperch slopes upward after the anus. The posterior quarter of the fish contains the upward sloping end of the anal fin, and the forked tail. The lateral line starts behind the gill cover and runs high on the back parallel to the edge of the body above the pectoral fin to the tail. The extension of fins can significantly change the redtail surfperch outline or profile.

== Size and age ==
Redtail surfperch grow to at least 2.1 kg (4.6 lb), 41 cm (16 in) total length; and reach an age of 14 years. Average back calculated length in Oregon (i.e. length at winter scale ring -annulus formation) at age 2.6–10 cm (1.0–3.9 in) and at age 2 is 16.4 cm (6.5 in). By age 3 the average length of females is larger than for males. Female growth in length appears to continue at a faster rate than male growth throughout life. Growth rate appears to vary with latitude and water temperature.

== Reproduction ==
Redtail surfperch, like other surfperch, are viviparous, a species that gives birth to live young. Amphistichus rhodoterus are iteroparous (i.e. reproducing multiple times during their life) with females giving birth annually after reaching sexual maturity at 3 or 4 years of age. Females along the central Oregon coast contain fertilized eggs near the first of the year, gestate for 8 months, and give birth in August and September. Northern California populations of redtail surfperch have a similar reproductive schedule, except that parturition (live birth) starts in July. Redtail surfperch normally give birth to between three and forty young; there is a strong correlation between female size and number of young. In the laboratory some young may not develop fully inside the female and can be reabsorbed or born dead. Wild caught fish rarely contain abnormal embryos. Water temperature affects growth of embryos, time of birth, and size at birth, and may be related to the faster growth of females.

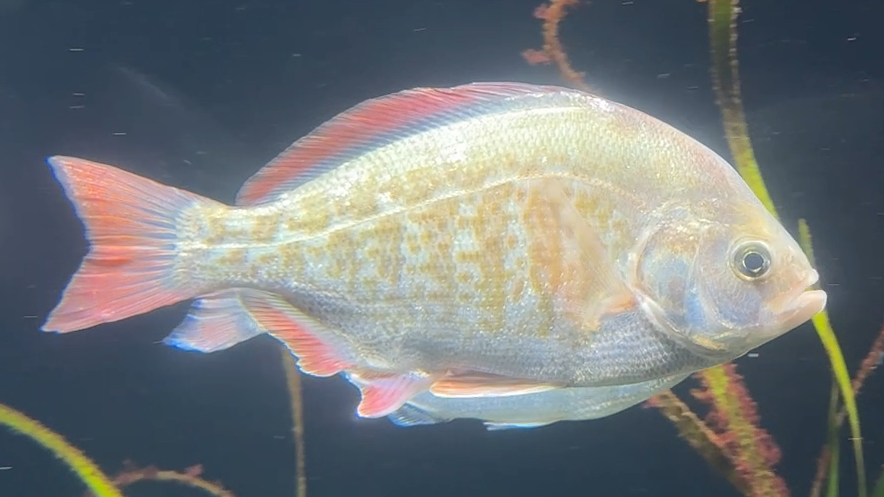
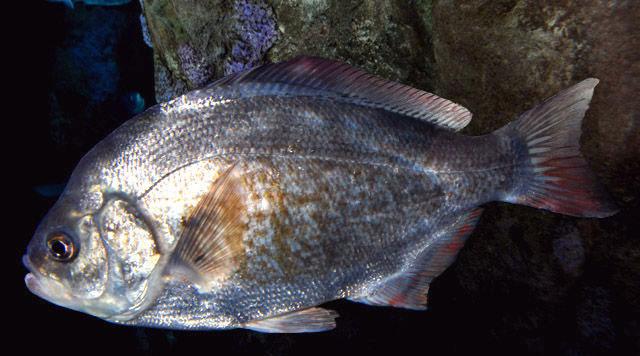
Male (left) and female (right). Males have notched anal fins, while females have un-notched anal fins.

Male redtail surfperch develop a distinctive permanent shortening of some anal fins rays as they mature; the shortened anal fin rays appear as a notch in profile and can be used to externally determine mature males from females and juvenile fish.

== Movement and migration ==
Redtail surfperch can move long distances along sandy beaches and coastlines, however migration around larger headlands like Cape Arago in southern Oregon has not been documented. Redtail surfperch appear to school like other surfperch. Gestating (i.e. pregnant) females are known to move miles up into estuaries along with fewer smaller females that do not appear to carry young. Male and young female redtail surfperch are uncommon in estuaries upstream of the entrance and jetties. Females carrying young are also known to concentrate near where small rivers and creeks empty into the ocean during summer. Gestating females and newborn redtail surfperch are rarely observed in estuaries near the time of birth, however neonates and females that have recently given birth have been captured along ocean beaches near the time of birth in reasonable numbers.

== Ecosystem ==
Species that co-occur with redtail surfperch on ocean beaches include the silver surfperch, Pacific staghorn sculpin, sandlance, Dungeness crab, shiner perch, mole crab, Pacific razor clam, sandhoppers and other crustaceans. Sandlance and crustaceans are eaten by the redtail surfperch. Redtail surfperch are documented to include a significant amount of fish in their diet unlike many other surfperch. Harbor seals are observed swimming and diving in areas where redtail surfperch were being caught; the fish often stop biting and may move when harbor seals arrive. Sea lions have been observed surfing in waves just offshore of redtail surfperch fishing beaches but not as close in-shore as harbor seals. Newborn silver surfperch co-occur with neonate (infant) redtail surfperch along Oregon beaches; however the silver surfperch are born smaller and up to two months earlier. Stranded-decaying kelp, seagrass, invasive marsh grass as well as plankton and bacteria contribute energy and nutrients to this beach ecosystem.

== Fisheries ==
Redtail surfperch are a popular sport fish in Washington, Oregon and Northern California; tens to hundreds-of-thousands of these fish are estimated to be caught by recreational anglers from each state annually. Redtail surfperch have been targeted by commercial fisheries in Northern California and are grouped with other surfperch in Oregon's commercial landings. Commercial fishing seasons close in California and Oregon near the time of birth. Redtail surfperch are caught from beaches (surf), piers, jetties and in estuaries, and are not reported from offshore deep-ocean areas. Size, age and sex of fish caught vary depending on location and time of year. Female fish containing developing embryos dominate the redtail surfperch caught inside estuaries upstream from the entrance and jetties. Large catches of redtail surfperch were recorded from Oregon estuaries during the 1960s and 1970s; catches appear to have decreased since then, however data is not directly comparable. Some locations, well known to anglers, consistently result in catches dominated by one sex or size of fish.
