= Reymondia minor =

Conservation status
- Least Concern (IUCN 3.1)

Scientific classification
- Kingdom: Animalia
- Phylum: Mollusca
- Class: Gastropoda
- Subclass: Caenogastropoda
- Family: Paludomidae
- Genus: Reymondia
- Species: R. minor

Binomial name
- Reymondia minor Smith, 1889

Species of gastropod

Reymondia minor is a species of small freshwater snail, an aquatic gastropod mollusc in the family Paludomidae. This species is found in Burundi, the Democratic Republic of the Congo, Tanzania, and Zambia. Its natural habitat is freshwater lakes.
