= Reymondia tanganyicensis =

Conservation status
- Vulnerable (IUCN 3.1)

Scientific classification
- Kingdom: Animalia
- Phylum: Mollusca
- Class: Gastropoda
- Subclass: Caenogastropoda
- Family: Paludomidae
- Genus: Reymondia
- Species: R. tanganyicensis

Binomial name
- Reymondia tanganyicensis Smith, 1889

Species of gastropod

Reymondia tanganyicensis is a species of freshwater snail in the family Paludomidae. It is endemic to Lake Tanganyika, where it is known from six locations within Burundi and Tanzania. It lives in shallow areas of the lake up to 3 meters (9.8 ft) deep, where it can be found under rocks. It is threatened by pollution and sedimentation in the lake.
