= Reymondia pyramidalis =

Conservation status
- Data Deficient (IUCN 3.1)

Scientific classification
- Kingdom: Animalia
- Phylum: Mollusca
- Class: Gastropoda
- Subclass: Caenogastropoda
- Family: Paludomidae
- Genus: Reymondia
- Species: R. pyramidalis

Binomial name
- Reymondia pyramidalis Bourguignat, 1888

Synonyms
- Reymondia minor Smith, 1889

Species of gastropod

Reymondia pyramidalis is a species of small freshwater snail, an aquatic gastropod mollusc in the family Paludomidae. This species is found in Tanzania and possibly the Democratic Republic of the Congo. Its natural habitat is freshwater lakes.

The shells of this species are similar in appearance to, though slightly smaller than, Reymondia horei. The maximum size of the shell is 9 millimetres (0.35 in) height by 4.5 millimetres (0.18 in) width at the widest point. It also has a similar habitat preference to R. horei: shallow water, underneath cobbles and rocks.
