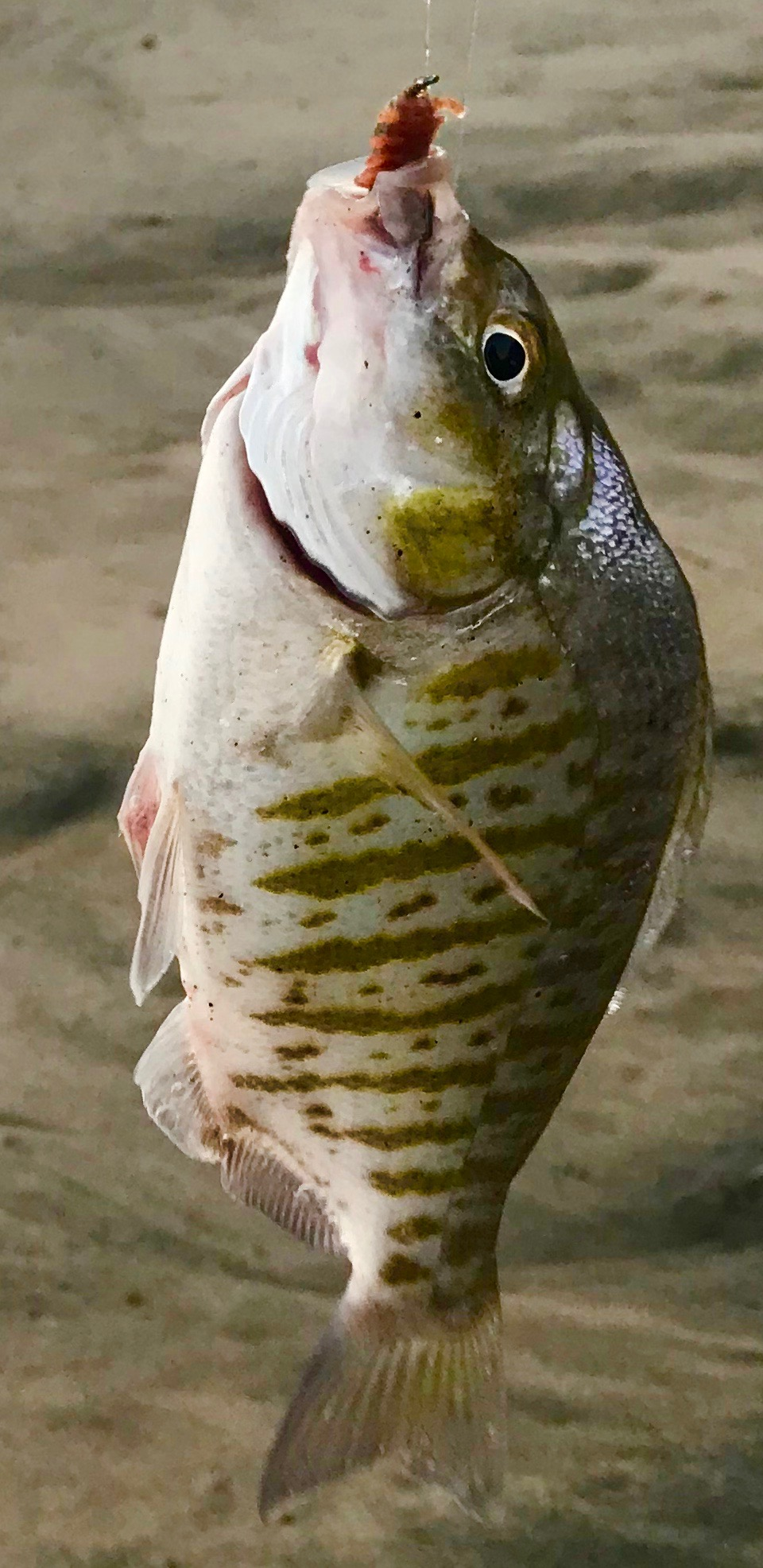
- Barred Surfperch caught at the Cowell Beach in Santa Cruz, CA, USA

Scientific classification
- Kingdom: Animalia
- Phylum: Chordata
- Class: Actinopterygii
- Order: Blenniiformes
- Family: Embiotocidae
- Genus: Amphistichus
- Species: A. argenteus

Binomial name
- Amphistichus argenteus Agassiz, 1854

Synonyms
- Mytilophagus fasciatus Gibbons, 1854; Amphistichus similis Girard, 1854; Amphistichus arenatus Ryder, 1885

= Barred surfperch =

Species of fish

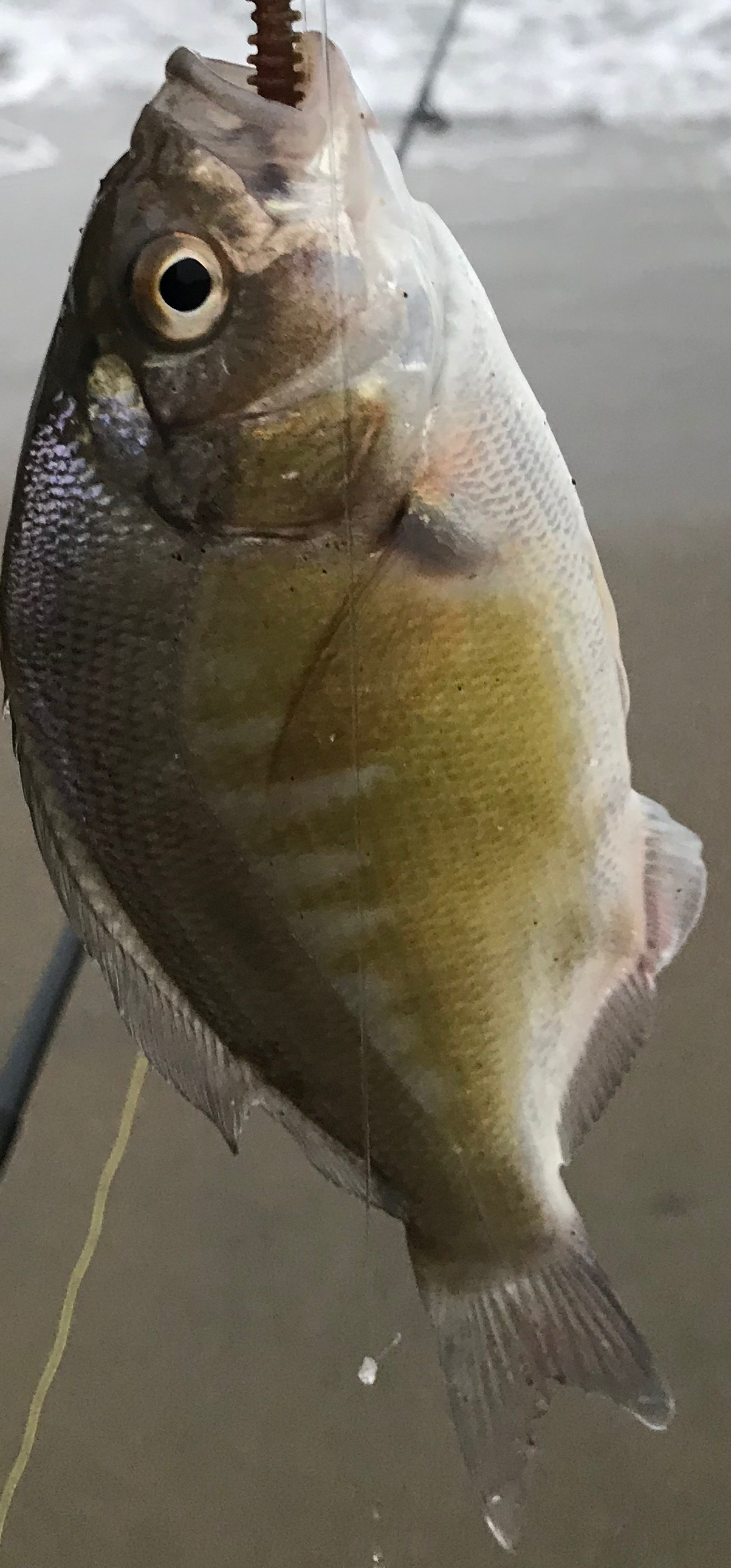
Barred Surfperch (less visible barres variant) caught at the Ocean Beach in San Francisco, CA, USA

The barred surfperch (Amphistichus argenteus) is a species of surfperch native to inshore waters from northern California, United States to southern Baja California, Mexico. It is also known as the sandperch, silver perch, or California perch.

They are one of 3 species of the genus Amphistichus, and one of the six species in the subfamily Amphistichinae (which includes Amphistichus and Hyperprosopon.)

== Etymology ==
"The scientific name of the Barred surfperch, Amphistichus argenteus, comes from the Greek word “Amphistichus,” meaning a double series, with regard to the two rows of teeth within each jaw. And “argenteus,” a Latin word meaning silvery."

== Description ==
Barred surfperch are a relatively deep bodied (oval-like) fish with a slender frontal profile. The back of the fish is a darker yellow to olive green, while the belly is white. The sides most often displays 9 vertical bronze bars with small spots in between them, with the barres being split across the lateral line. A non-barred variant with a golden color across the whole body are also common. There is a connected dorsal fin with 9-11 spines and 19-28 longer soft rays, while the anal fin has 15-35 soft rays. The lower jaw juts out less than the upper jaw, and does not reach past the eye.

This species can reach a length of 49.5 cm (19.5 in) TL though most do not exceed 30 cm (12 in) TL. The maximum recorded weight is 2.15 kg (4.7 lb), making them the largest of the surfperches in length and second largest in weight. It likely does not exceed 10 years in age.

According to the California Department of Fish and Game, Barred Surfperch can be identified by bars and spots on sides which are often unbarred, as well as the absence of red tail.

== Reproduction ==
Barred surfperch, like other surfperch, they are viviparous, giving birth to live young. The fish mates in the winter, often between September and November, and may move closer to shore to mate. They give birth to many free-swimming developed fry that range from 51–76 mm (2.0–3.0 in), and may hold over 100 embryos at a time. The number of fish spawned is dependent on the size of the mother female.

== Habitat and ecology ==
Barred surfperch range from Guerrero Negro in Central Baja California, to Northern California, and are rarely seen north of Bodega Bay.

While often ranging in shallow waters of the surf zone under 5 m (16 ft) deep, the fish has also been identified at depths up to 73 m (240 ft). They are often found along sandy beaches longer than 1 km (0.62 mi) but are also seen in enclosed "pocket beaches" in coves. Occasionally they may be found above rocky substrates, near pier pilings, or in bays.

== Diet ==
The diet of the barred surfperch consists predominantly of sand crabs, which may be as much as 90% of the fish's diet. They also eat polychaete worms, skeleton shrimps and gammarid zooplankton, and small fish like anchovies and juvenile sardines. It also consumes small bivalve mollusks like bean clams and small mussels.

Younger fish occasionally eat fish eggs of the Northern anchovy (Engraulis mordax), Pacific sardine (Sardinops sagax caeruleus), and smelts—Osmerids and Atherinopsids.

As a demersal feeder, they are often found close to the bottom of the seabed.

== Fishery ==
Barred surfperch are an important sport fishery for most surf fishermen in California, as they are common in the surf zone. Anglers use sand crabs, sandworms, blood worms, shrimp, squid, cut fish, and small hard baits to catch these fish.
