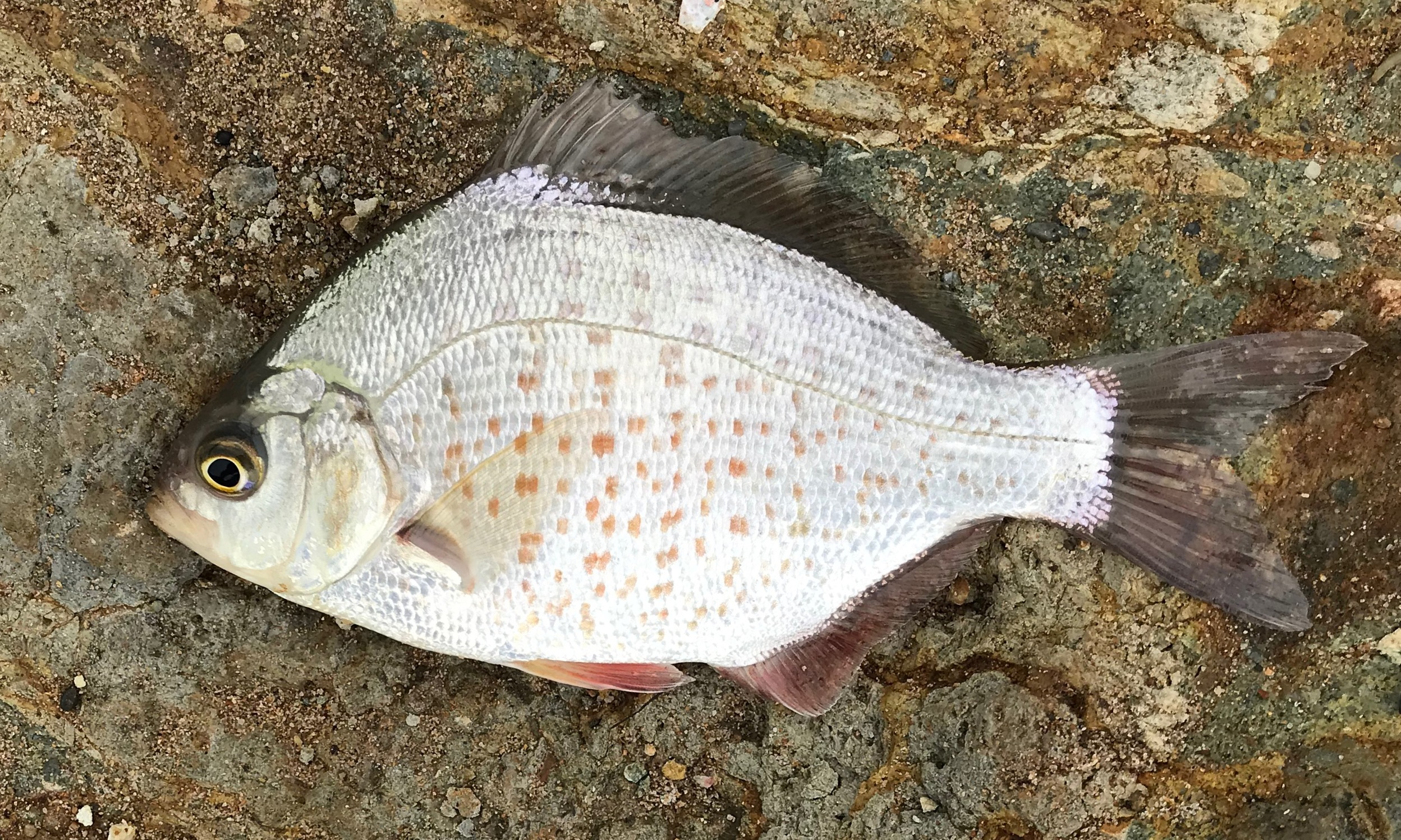
- At Pescadero State Beach, California

Conservation status
- Least Concern (IUCN 3.1)

Scientific classification
- Kingdom: Animalia
- Phylum: Chordata
- Class: Actinopterygii
- Order: Blenniiformes
- Family: Embiotocidae
- Genus: Amphistichus
- Species: A. koelzi

Binomial name
- Amphistichus koelzi (Hubbs, 1933)

Synonyms
- Crossochir koelzi Hubbs, 1933

= Amphistichus koelzi =

Species of fish

The Calico surfperch (Amphistichus koelzi), also known as the Humpback perch or Porgee, is a species of surfperch native to the Eastern Pacific Ocean. They are primarily found along the west coast of the United States (California, Oregon, and Washington). The specific name honours the American fisheries biologist Walter Koelz (1895-1989).

== Description ==
According to the California Department of Fish and Game, Calico surfperch are distinguished from other surfperches by a noticeable notch between the dorsal soft and hard/spiny rays. Further, the dorsal hard and soft rays are of equal length and sides often have broken bars and spots on each side. Compared to the closely related redtail surfperch (A. rhodoterus,) the body is much deeper and more oval, often being described as "disc-like." While both fish have anal and pelvic fins with a reddish hue, the redtail surfperch's caudal/tailfin is much deeper red. The redtail also has longer dorsal spines.

The maximum size is 32.5 cm (12.8 in) and a weight of 1 kg (2.2 lb), but most are often under 26 cm (10 in).

Like other surfperch, the fish is viviparous, meaning it gives birth to live, developed young. The fish can live up to 6 years.

== Habitat and Ecology ==
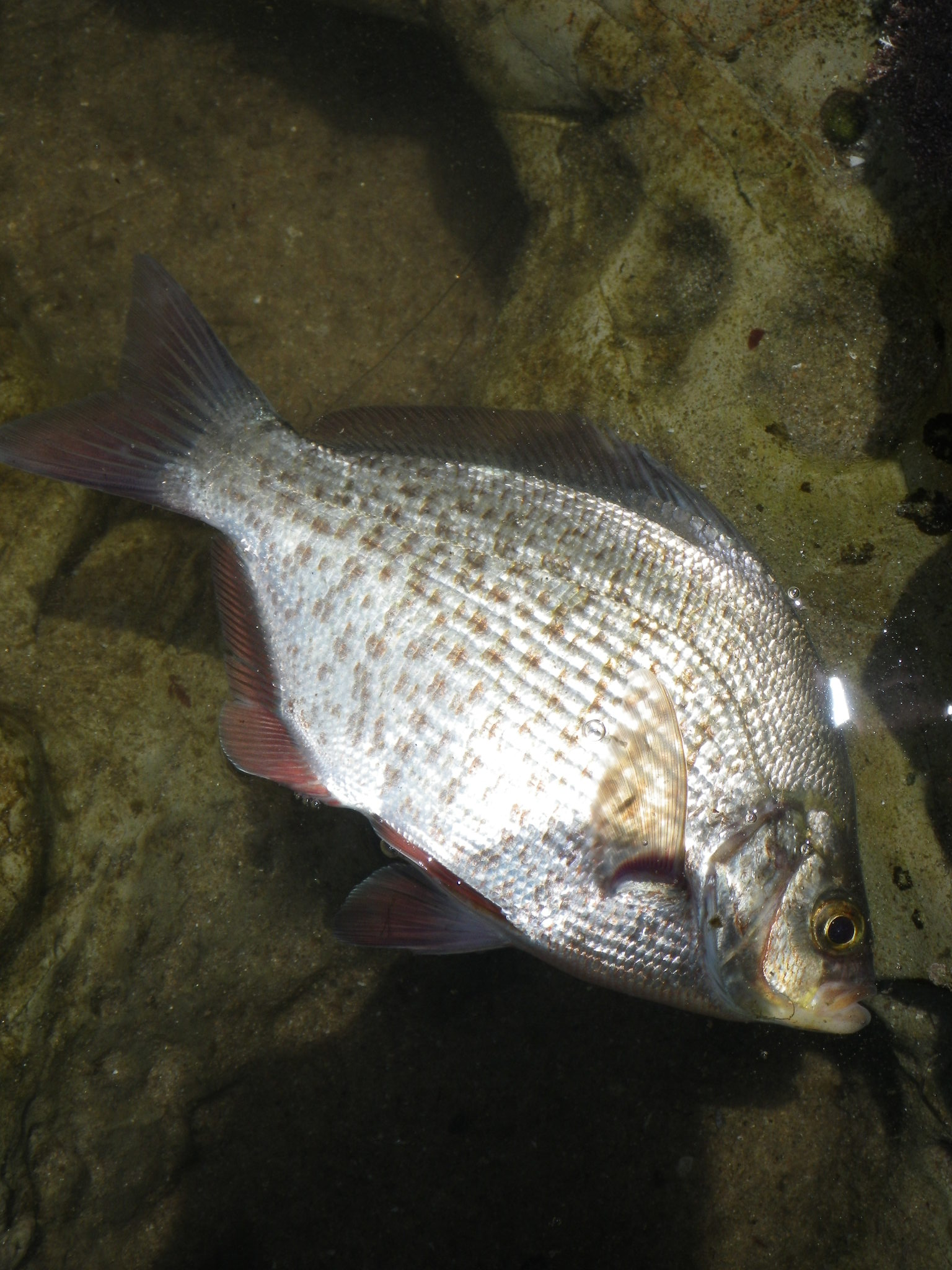
A calico surfperch swimming underwater

Like other surfperch in the genus Amphistichus, the calico surfperch is often found in small schools in the surf zone with sandy, shallow waters. It may also inhabit rocky reefs and congregates around artificial structure like piers. It has been recorded at a depth of up to 9.1 m (30 ft).

The fish is found from Cape Flattery in Washington to Guerrero Negro in Central Baja California

== Diet ==
The calico surfperch is a demersal feeder, primarily eating benthic invertebrates such as mole crabs, gammarid zooplankton, and shrimp, including mollusks like clams and mussels.

== Fishery ==
The fish is a common recreational catch by anglers, especially from Central California. There is no large scale commercial fishery for the species. Historically, they may have been overfished, but have now recovered due to more practicing of catch-and-release. Its meat has been described as mild-flavored with a soft texture, and is often fried when being eaten.
