= Reymondia =

Scientific classification
- Kingdom: Animalia
- Phylum: Mollusca
- Class: Gastropoda
- Subclass: Caenogastropoda
- Family: Paludomidae
- Subfamily: Hauttecoeuriinae
- Tribe: Spekiini
- Genus: Reymondia; Bourguignat, 1885

Diversity
- 4 species

Genus of molluscs

Reymondia is a genus of freshwater snails, aquatic gastropod mollusks in the family Paludomidae.

== Species ==
Species in the genus Reymondia include:

- Reymondia horei (Smith, 1880) - type species
- Reymondia minor Smith, 1889
- Reymondia pyramidalis Bourguignat, 1888
- Reymondia tanganyicensis Smith, 1889
