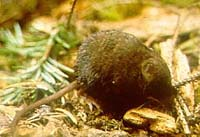

Conservation status
- Least Concern (IUCN 3.1)

Scientific classification
- Kingdom: Animalia
- Phylum: Chordata
- Class: Mammalia
- Order: Eulipotyphla
- Family: Soricidae
- Genus: Sorex
- Species: S. bairdi

Binomial name
- Sorex bairdi Merriam, 1895
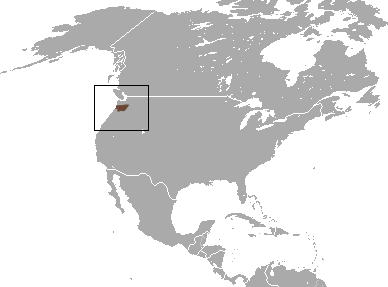
- Baird's shrew range

= Baird's shrew =

Species of mammal

Baird's shrew (Sorex bairdi) is a species of mammal in the family Soricidae. It is endemic to northwest Oregon. Baird's shrew inhabits moist conifer forests.

== Description ==
Its fur is darker brown in winter than in summer, when it is brownish-chestnut or olive brown, with paler sides and belly. Males and females are about the same size, which is common among shrews in general. Also like other shrew species, Baird's shrew feeds on insects, worms, snails, and spiders. It shares the forests of its range with six other species of shrew, such as the Pacific shrew.

Body length ranges from 100 to 143 mm (3.9 to 5.6 in), with an average weight of 7.6 g (0.27 oz), but ranging anywhere from 5.5 to 11.2 g (0.19 to 0.40 oz).

== Subspecies ==
Baird's shrew has two subspecies:

- Sorex bairdi bairdi, (Merriam, 1895) Type locality: "Oregon, Clatsop County, Astoria"
- Sorex bairdi permiliensis, (Jackson, 1918). Type locality: "Permilia Lake, W base Mt. Jefferson, Cascade Range, Marion Co., Oregon."

== See also ==
- List of mammals of Oregon
