= Mutton Mountains =

Mountain range in Oregon, United States

- Location within Oregon

Highest point
- Elevation: 1,247 m (4,091 ft)

Geography
- Country: United States
- State: Oregon
- District: Wasco County
- Range coordinates: 44°56′51.428″N 121°10′36.200″W
- Topo map: USGS Mutton Mountain

The Mutton Mountains are a mountain range in Wasco County, Oregon.

== Geology ==
The Mutton Mountains compromise of one ancient, extinct Clarno volcano that erupted within the John Day Fossils Bed.
