= Fog shrew =

Conservation status
- Least Concern (IUCN 3.1)

Scientific classification
- Kingdom: Animalia
- Phylum: Chordata
- Class: Mammalia
- Order: Eulipotyphla
- Family: Soricidae
- Genus: Sorex
- Species: S. sonomae

Binomial name
- Sorex sonomae Jackson, 1921
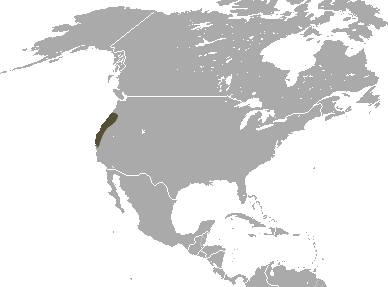
- Fog Shrew range

Species of mammal

The fog shrew (Sorex sonomae') is a species of mammal in the family Soricidae. It is endemic to northern California and Oregon in the United States.

== Description ==
S. sonomae is categorized as the "largest" shrew found on the "Pacific Coast" of the United States. It is recognized by its "reddish, light-brown" fur and a tail that "is almost ly colored." Some information is available on the fog shrew's dentition; however, there is no citable reference for the dental formula. One paper has found the dental formula of the fog shrew to be 3.1.3.32.0.1.3 (x 2 = 32 total teeth), but there is debate in the academic community. A conservative estimate has an adult fog shrew ranging in total length from 120-158mm, but has been observed to have a wider range in total length (105-180mm). The weight range for the fog shrew varies in different sources, but falls within the range of 5.5–18 g (0.19–0.63 oz).

== Habitat and range ==
The fog shrew is found in areas of "chaparral, coastal coniferous forests, and marshy areas." The areas in which individuals live tend to be moist environments. This includes being near creeks and on the forest floor under fallen trees and other debris.

The southernmost range of S. sonomae is Marin County near the city of Sonoma in California and range north to the "central coast of Oregon." They tend to stay closer to the coast and not move far inland unless they are near a body of water.

== Diet ==
Like most shrews, S. sonomae is an insectivore. The fog shrew's diet consists mainly of "centipedes and spiders", but has also been known to eat "slugs and snails."
