= Surf zone =

Nearshore zone where wave water comes onto the shore

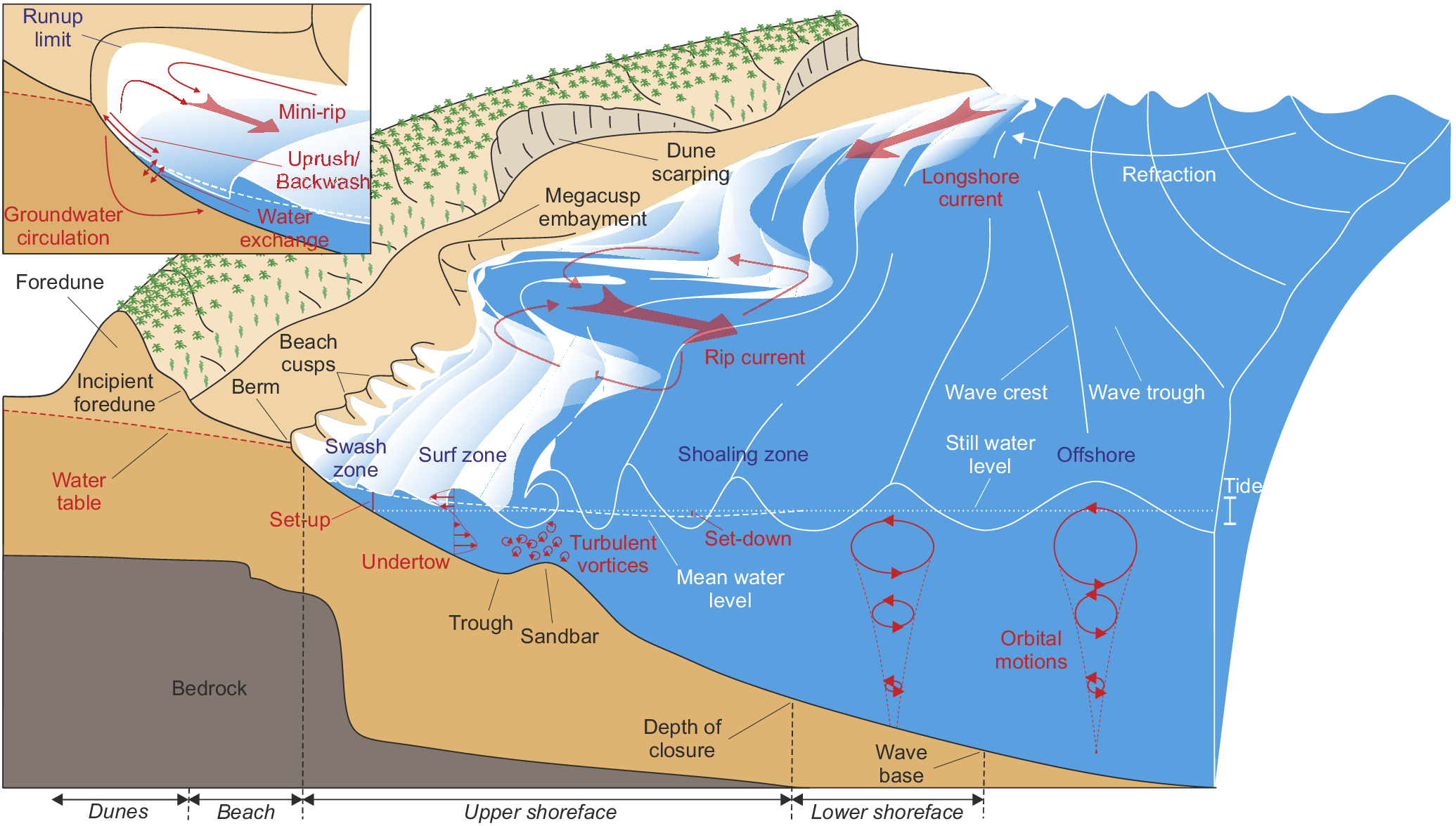
Schematic representation of the shoreface profile

The surf zone or breaker zone is the nearshore part of a body of open water between the line at which the waves break and the shore. As ocean surface waves approach a shore, they interact with the bottom, get taller and steeper, and break, forming the foamy surface called surf. The region of breaking waves defines the surf zone. After breaking in the surf zone, the waves (now reduced in height) continue to move in, and they run up onto the sloping front of the beach, forming an uprush of water called swash. The water then runs back again as backwash. The water in the surf zone is relatively shallow, depending on the height and period of the waves.

== Animal life ==
The animals that often are found living in the surf zone are crabs, clams, and snails. Surf clams and mole crabs are two species that stand out as inhabitants of the surf zone. Both of these animals are very fast burrowers. The surf clam, also known as the variable coquina, is a filter feeder that uses its gills to filter microalgae, tiny zooplankton, and small particulates out of seawater. The mole crab is a suspension feeder that eats by capturing zooplankton with its antennae. All of these creatures burrow down into the sand to escape from being pulled into the ocean from the tides and waves. They also burrow themselves in the sand to protect themselves from predators. The surf zone is full of nutrients, oxygen, and sunlight which leaves the zone very productive with animal life.

== Rip currents ==
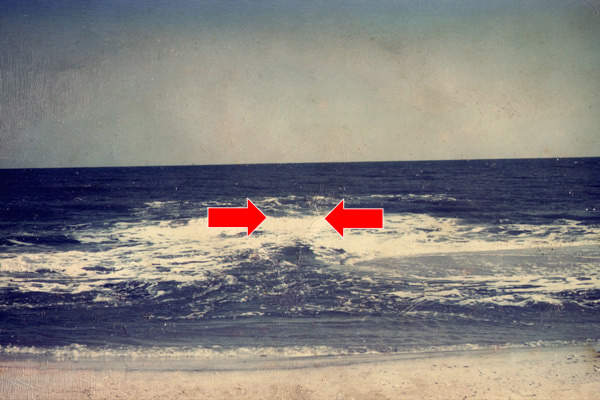
Rip current in the ocean. Rip currents are often very difficult to spot with one's bare eyes, take caution in any body of water

The surf zone can contain dangerous rip currents: strong local currents which flow offshore and pose a threat to swimmers. Rip-current outlooks use the following set of qualifications:

Low-risk rip currents
Wind and/or wave conditions are not expected to support the development of rip currents; however, rip currents can sometimes occur, especially in the vicinity of jetties and piers. Know how to swim and heed the advice of lifeguards.
Moderate-risk rip currents
Wind or wave conditions support stronger or more frequent rip currents. Only experienced surf swimmers should enter the water.
High-risk rip currents
Wind or wave conditions support dangerous rip currents. Rip currents are life-threatening to anyone entering the surf.

== See also ==
- Intertidal zone
- Littoral zone
- Surf fishing
