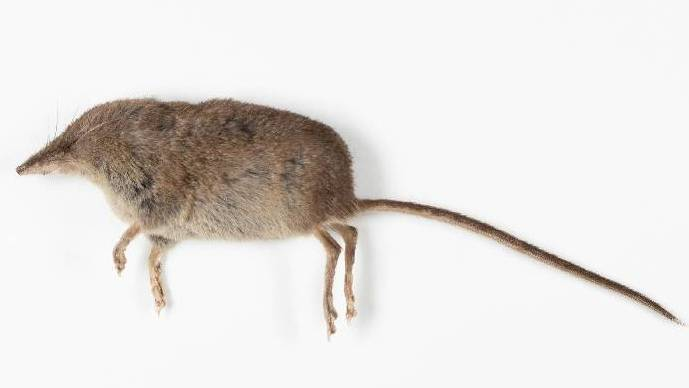

Conservation status
- Least Concern (IUCN 3.1)

Scientific classification
- Kingdom: Animalia
- Phylum: Chordata
- Class: Mammalia
- Order: Eulipotyphla
- Family: Soricidae
- Genus: Sorex
- Species: S. pacificus

Binomial name
- Sorex pacificus Coues, 1877
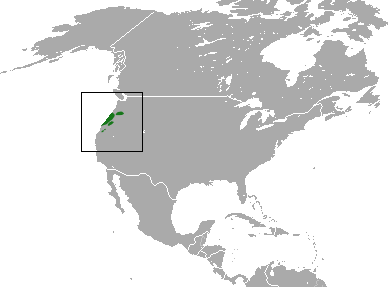
- Pacific shrew range

= Pacific shrew =

Species of mammal

The Pacific shrew (Sorex pacificus) is a species of mammal in the family Soricidae. It is endemic to western Oregon in the United States. The Pacific shrew is native to western Oregon, more specifically from the Siltcoos lake to the coast going from the border line of Douglas and Lane counties continuing south to the northern parts of California. The first documented Pacific shrew to be caught was found at the mouth of the Umpqua River in 1858. They are normally found in damp areas along creeks in forests and sometimes near collapsed trees. Their refuge is of the utmost importance and they are seldom found far from it. This includes collapsed trees or dense vegetation. They use the flora to build a nest, gathering small plants such as grass, moss, lichen, or leaves into a pile and pushing themselves into the middle.

== Description ==
They are the largest brown shrew in western Oregon. They weigh only 10 to 18 g (0.35 to 0.63 oz) and their length (including the tail) is 135 to 160 mm (5.3 to 6.3 in). In the summer time they have short, red-tinted brown hair, which gets longer and darker moving into the colder seasons. Their feet and tails are usually a tan color with the possibility of being brown. Sometimes older shrews will have dark tips to their tails. Their tails are, on average, greater than 75% of the body's length. Like their fur, their incisor teeth have a reddish brown tint on the tips.

This specific type of shrew has teeth that are distinct from other soricids. They do not have median tines on their upper incisors, although some specimens have been observed to have a bump or a bridge connecting those upper incisors near the middle segment.

Notably, like all shrews, the Pacific Shrews have significantly small eyes. Due to this, they heavily rely on their other senses, which is why they communicate through sound and use their sense of smell and hearing to hunt.

== Hunting and prey ==
The Pacific shrew goes hunting and much of their prey is actually treacherous to them. They find their prey with their excellent hearing and sense of smell. They will jump into the air to catch flying prey and dig underground after food. Their prey includes: slugs, snails, earthworms, centipedes, millipedes, scorpions, and various insects. In general they will paralyze their prey, but if they are in danger, for example with a wasp, they will kill it immediately. When prey is captured they will either eat it right where it was killed or store it near their nest, in a cache, for later sustenance.

As previously mentioned, the Pacific Shrew prey on various insects, including those that fly like wasps and bees. For prey that are not capable of flying, the Pacific Shrew locates them through smell. However, for prey that are airborne, they use their sense of hearing to locate them. They do not seem to be interested in hunting when not hungry.

== Behavior ==
Pacific shrew are generally not active during the day. They have been observed to wake at intervals in order to access food that has been stored at a prior time, usually near their nests, which are built with materials that the shrew transports by carrying in its mouth. At night, these shrews have been observed to vocalize at frequent intervals, paired with sniffing behaviors.

In terms of grooming, Pacific shrew will usually groom themselves while crouched, although when observed to be cleaning the genital region, they would be in a different position. Genital cleaning was observed to occur for roughly 2 minutes in captivity, though wild behavior is generally unknown. Normal grooming of the body consisted of scratching with the back foot, which was afterwards licked clean with the tongue.

When sleeping, these particular shrews generally have been seen with their snouts close to their behinds, curled up, with their tails either curled or stretched out. This way, there is less surface area that is exposed to the wild, and body heat can be used in an effective manner.

Furthermore, captive shrews were seen engaging in coprography, or the ingestion of feces. It is speculated that this may be a method of getting their vitamins B and K. After defecation, Pacific shrew can be observed dragging their anus along the ground in an effort to clean and groom themselves. Different types of food in their feeding habits would cause different textures of feces, which sometimes were watery and ejected from the body via squirting, or at other times contained remains of hard skeletons.

== Burrowing habits ==
The Pacific Shrew is the second largest shrew in western Oregon, they are nocturnal, and prefer moist environments. As shews, their front feet and clawed toes are adapted to digging. Their burrowing habits are interesting; they prefer to use existing burrows of other small mammals to dig its own shallow runway systems. These underground systems serve as spaces for shelter, foraging, and food storage. As previously mentioned, the Pacific Shrew has the tendency to utilize existing burrows of other mammals. However, they are also capable of digging their own. Ideally, they look for areas with deep and uncompacted soil. Ideally, their nests are constructed under natural cover, such as fallen logs, stumps, and dense vegetation. The nests of Pacific Shrew resemble a bowled or cupped-shape, composed of typical materials like grasses, moss, lichen, and leaves.

== Known predators ==
Pacific giant salamanders, spotted owls, and raptors are observed predators of the Pacific Shrew. The brown coat of Pacific Shrews allow them to camouflage into their natural surroundings, under leaves, logs, etc. Moreover, the Pacific shrew is small and agile, which allows them to move swiftly and hide in spaces their predators may not be able to reach.

== Population and conservation ==
Not much is known about the population of the Pacific shrew, but they are not a rare sight. It is very likely that their numbers are more than 10,000. In all likelihood, their population size has not decreased over twenty five percent over a long period of time. According to the International Union of Conservation of Nature (IUCN) they are of least concern. They are doing very well in numbers. This might be because there have been no major threats recognized. They are nocturnal so their main predators are owls, but they have been known to be caught by salamanders. Although they are not threatened there are safe places for them to live such as the Crater Lake national park and other state parks. However, holistically, the Pacific Shrew's habitats are threatened by deforestation. With human interventions, like logging, there is less shelter for creatures like shrews–making them more vulnerable to predators.

== Reproduction ==
Like other shrews, annually, Pacific Shrews produce around four to five offspring; however, their newly born offspring tend to have the average life expectancy of around eighteen months. Even though these organisms are presumably considered an r-selected species— a term used to describe species that have large litter and short life expectancy due to the lack of parental care, the shrew's lifespan is typically short due to the fact the environment they inhabit makes it difficult for their ability to flourish after persisting through harsh winters.

The Pacific Shrew's breeding preference differs between the shrew's gender throughout the year, and whether they are sexually mature enough depending on how long they have "overwintered," or gained maturity through enduring the harsh winter climate. It usually takes around four to six months for these organisms to achieve reproductive maturity. Though both male and female shrews are most fertile up until August, females are more reproductively active during the months of March through August, with males' sexual activity starting around February. Occasionally, females produce litter in November; despite this, the average gestation period for shrews— the time between conception and childbirth, lasts around three weeks.

== Phylogenetic relationships ==
The Pacific Shrew holds numerous interspecies relationships among other shrews, historically noted in being sub-related to Sorex vagrans, which are native in parts of western North America. These shrews all together have similar behavioral patterns and habitat— in terms of burrowing habits; however, some of their main distinctive differences include their physical appearance and diet. For example, Sorex vagrans are identified in contrast to the Sorex pacificus through the structure of its teeth, which differs among environmental adaptations and genetics.

Moreover, one of the Pacific Shrew's closest interspecies relationships is with the Dusky Shrew, or Sorex monticolus. The two are part of the "Coastal Clade," which refers to the coastal region in which several related species heavily reside, despite rapid evolutionary changes. The Dusky Shrew was originally classified as a subspecies of the Pacific Shrew, sharing molecular, physical, and regional characteristics; however, the two have been reclassified and distinguished as separate organisms from one another due to the Pacific Shrew's longer width, due to its lengthier tail, and differences between teeth.
